= Schema (Kant) =

Rule by which a concept is associated with a sensory input in Kantianism

In Kantian philosophy, a transcendental schema (plural: schemata; from Ancient Greek: σχῆμα, 'form, shape, figure') is the procedural rule by which a category or pure, non-empirical concept is associated with a sense impression. A private, subjective intuition is thereby discursively thought to be a representation of an external object. Transcendental schemata are supposedly produced by the imagination in relation to time.

== Role in Kant's architectonic system ==
Kant created an architectonic system in which there is a progression of phases from the most formal to the most empirical: "Kant develops his system of corporeal nature in the following way. He starts in the Critique with the most formal act of human cognition, called by him the transcendental unity of apperception, and its various aspects, called the logical functions of judgment. He then proceeds to the pure categories of the understanding, and then to the schematized categories, and finally to the transcendental principles of nature in general." It is within this system that the transcendental schemata are supposed to serve a crucial purpose. Many interpreters of Kant have emphasized the importance of the schematism.

== Purpose of the schematism chapter ==
If pure concepts of the understanding (the Kantian categories) and sense perceptions are radically different from each other, what common quality allows them to relate? Kant wrote the chapter on Schematism in his Critique of Pure Reason to solve the problem of "...how we can ensure that categories have 'sense and significance.' "

A posteriori concepts have sense when they are derived from a mental image that is based on experienced sense impressions. Kant's a priori concepts, on the other hand, are alleged to have sense when they are derived from a non–experienced mental schema, trace, outline, sketch, monogram, or minimal image. This is similar to a Euclidean geometrical diagram.

Whenever two things are totally different from each other, yet must interact, there must be some common characteristic that they share in order to somehow relate to one another. Kantian Categories, or a priori concepts, have, according to Kant, a basic and necessary importance for human knowledge, even though they are totally different from sensations. However, they must be connected in some way with sensed experience because "… an a priori concept which cannot, as it were, establish any empirical connections is a fraud … the purpose of the Schematism chapter was to show that the categories at least do have satisfactory empirical connections." Kant was preoccupied "with bridging the otherwise heterogeneous poles of 'thought' and 'sensation' in the Schematism of the Pure Concepts of the Understanding (A 138/B 177)."

== Explication of the Kantian account of schemata ==
=== Three types of concept and their schemata ===
There are three types of concept that require a schema in order to connect them to phenomenal sense perceptions so that they have sense [Sinn] and meaning [Bedeutung]. These three types are (1) empirical concepts, (2) pure (mathematical) sensuous concepts, and (3) pure concepts of the understanding, or [Kantian] Categories. The first two employ schemata. The third employs transcendental schemata.

==== Empirical concepts ====
An empirical concept is the abstract thought of that which is common to several perceptions. When an empirical concept is said to contain an object, whatever is thought in the concept must be intuited in the mental representation of the object. Examples of intuitive perceptions that are the content of empirical concepts are vague images that are imagined in order to connect a concept with the perceptions from which it was derived as their common feature. "Intuitions," Kant wrote, "are always required to verify or demonstrate the reality of our concepts." These examples ensure that "our abstract thinking has not strayed far from the safe ground of perception, and has possibly become somewhat high-flown or even a mere idle display of words." This is because "concepts are quite impossible, and are utterly without meaning or signification, unless an object is given for the concepts themselves, or at least for the elements of which they consist." For example, "The concept of a dog signifies a rule according to which my imagination can trace, delineate, or draw a general outline, figure, or shape of a four-footed animal without being restricted to any single and particular shape supplied by experience." In order to prevent the emptiness of "thoughts without contents," it is "necessary to make our concepts sensible, i.e., to add an object of intuition to them." In order to test whether a concept is sensible, we sometimes " … go back to perception only tentatively and for the moment, by calling up in imagination a perception corresponding to the concept that occupies us at the moment, a perception that can never be quite adequate to the (general) concept, but is a mere representative of it for the time being. … Kant calls a fleeting phantasm of this kind a schema."

==== Pure sensuous (mathematical) concepts ====
These are concepts that relate, prior to experience, to the external sense of space and the internal sense of time. As such, they are mathematical in that they refer to geometry and arithmetic. A pure, sensuous concept is the construction or mental drawing of what is common to several geometrical figures. These mathematical concepts are not based on objective visual images. They are based on schemata that exist only in thought. Any particular image could not be as general as the concept. The schemata are rules that allow the imagination to mentally construct or draw or trace a pure, general geometrical form that gives the pure, sensuous concept significance. "… [T]o possess the schema corresponding to the concept triangle is to be able to envisage the variety of things to which the word "triangle" applies." "[T]he schema of sensuous concepts (such as of figures in space) is a product and, as it were, a monogram of the pure imagination a priori. Images become possible only through the schema. But the images must always be connected with the concept only by means of the designated schema. Otherwise, the images can never be fully congruent to the general concept."

==== Pure concepts of the understanding (categories) ====
A pure concept of the understanding, or category, is a characteristic, predicate, attribute, quality, or property of any possible object, that is, an object in general or as such. These concepts are not abstractions of what is common to several perceived, particular, individual objects, as are empirical concepts. "Since the categories are a priori and are therefore not abstractions from sense perceptions, they owe their origin to the very nature of the mind itself." They are not derived from perceptions of external objects, as are empirical concepts. Instead, they are the result of the way that the mind is constituted or formed. They come from within the mind, not from outside of the mind.

Kant claimed that the schemata of pure, non-empirical concepts, or categories, provide a reference to intuition in a way similar to the manner of empirical concepts. "If the concepts are empirical, the intuitions are called examples; if they are pure concepts of the understanding, the intuitions are called schemata." In the same way that examples provide signification for empirical concepts, schemata help to answer the question of "whether operating with the categories is anything other than playing with words."

Since the pure concepts of the understanding, or categories, are characteristics of all objects in general, they can never be associated with the image of any specific, particular, individual object. "Since they are pure, they cannot be pictures..." "Yet there must be some connection between the abstract idea and the experienced world to which the idea is expected to apply..." "In order for the pure categories to have objective validity (and not merely subjective validity) they must be related to sensibility."

===== Applying pure concepts to sense impressions =====
The categories, or pure concepts of the understanding, are a priori logical innate forms that are conditions of the possibility of things in general, or of things as such. A thing can become a known object of thought when an a posteriori sense impression is comprehended through the forms of the categories. Categories and sense impressions are totally different from each other. Categories are utterly heterogeneous with the perceptions that are experienced through the sense organs. In order for specific phenomena of Nature to be thought from the combination of categories (pure concepts) and sense perceptions, there must be a third, mediating procedure that connects them. This mediator is a transcendental schema. Transcendental schemata meaningfully join the empty "thoughts without content" and the blind "intuitions without concepts."

Schemata that mediate between empirical (a posteriori) concepts or mathematical (pure sensuous) concepts and perceptions are similar to adapters. Just as adapters are devices for fitting together incompatible parts, schemata connect empirical concepts with the perceptions from which they were derived. Schemata are rules for the production of images. As rules, they are related to concepts. As image–producers, they are related to perceptions. "While the concept belongs to the understanding and its instance to perception, the schema has, so to speak, a foot in either domain. As rules for the production of images the schemata … are linked to the understanding; as rules for the production of images they are linked to perception." The "adapter" simile is even more apt in the case of transcendental schemata. This is because pure concepts of the understanding (Categories) are totally unrelated to perceptions. The pure concepts or Categories are original constituent components of the understanding and are not derived from empirical sense perceptions.

===== Transcendental schemata =====
Transcendental schemata are not related to empirical concepts or to mathematical concepts. These schemata connect pure concepts of the understanding, or categories, to the phenomenal appearance of objects in general, that is, objects as such, or all objects.

===== Judgement =====
Transcendental Schematism results from the ability to make judgements. Judgement applies "the concepts of the understanding [the Categories] to phenomena." " … [T]he judgement … schematizes these concepts a priori and applies these schemata, without which no experiential judgement would be possible, to each empirical synthesis. … the transcendental schematism of judgement provides it [judgement] with a rule under which given empirical intuitions are to be subsumed." Kant defined the Greek word hypotyposis as a " … rendering perceptible to the senses, making sensual (Versinnlichung)." The usual definition is "example, pattern, outline, or sketch." If a hypotyposis is schematic, according to Kant, "...to a concept, which is comprehended by the understanding, the corresponding intuition is given a priori..." This is in opposition to a symbolic hypotyposis, like God, in which the concept can only be thought by Reason and to which no sensible intuition can be adequate. Schemata contain direct presentations of the concept. They make this presentation demonstratively, not by the use of analogies. Judgement, according to Kant, works mechanically with given appearances and brings them under concepts. It does this as a tool that is utilized and controlled by both the understanding and the senses. To avoid possible mistakes in judgements one must conduct the transcendental reflection.

===== Time =====
The schematism of the pure understanding is "the sensuous condition [time] under which alone pure concepts of the understanding [the Categories] can be used." Categories, or pure concepts of the understanding, are abstract representations of objects in general. However, they can result in thought about particular, specific internal or external objects if they are related to time. All concepts are derived from perceptions, therefore pure concepts [Categories] are based on pure perceptions. The purest perception, or schema, is time. Time has the purest relation to sensation that is possible. It is the mere form of sensation because sensations must be felt in succession. Therefore, time was designated by Kant as the purest possible schema of a pure concept.

All things are experienced in time, that is, in succession, one after another. This applies to our internal selves as well as to all external objects. Since categories are the forms through which every specific thing can be thought as being in time, categories are related to time. Thus, pure concepts, or categories, and phenomenal objects share time as a common feature. Therefore, time is the means by which an intuited phenomenon is subsumed under a pure concept. Schemata are transcendental time determinations. "Hence it will be possible for the category to be applied to appearances by means of the transcendental time determination, which, as the schema of the concepts of the understanding, mediates the subsumption of appearances under the category."

===== Schemata are procedural rules, not images =====
Because schemata are determinations of objects in general, not specific, individual objects, they are not particular images. Kant asserted that "… a schema must be distinguished from an image." A schema is a procedural rule. The rule prescribes the way to relate a pure concept to an object in general. Schemata are ways of applying pure concepts (categories) to sense impressions. They are prescriptions for graphically illustrating a pure concept. A schema is a method for representing a non-empirical concept in any image as such or any image in general. " … [F]or Kant a schema is not an image, but a capacity to form images or (perhaps) to construct models." "The schema of a pure concept of the understanding is something which can never be made into an image..."

Lewis White Beck wrote, "The pure concepts of the understanding…are applied to the pure form of intuition (time) to give rise to the 'transcendental schemata' or rules of the application of pure concepts to whatever sense–impressions we receive." To exemplify this, he continued, "To take the most important example, we have the hypothetical (if–then) judgment, which is the mode of judgment under the category of cause. This is applied to phenomena in time by the schema of causation, namely, the rule that the cause of a phenomenon is another phenomenon that invariably precedes it in time…." In this way, Beck showed that a transcendental schema is the rule that leads to the understanding of successive [in time] sensations according to various pure concepts [Kant's "categories"].

===== Examples of different categories and their schemata =====
Each category has one schema. Some schemas are shared by other categories in their class.

- The categories of quantity all share the schema of number. Quantity is related to a numerical time series. William H.S. Monck claimed that Kant can be understood as saying "In apprehending an object I always successively add part to part, and thus generate a series of determinate magnitude." Unity is one moment in time. Plurality is several moments. Totality is expressed as all moments. But Monck noted that "Kant does not trace out specially the Schemata of the Categories of Unity, Plurality, and Totality." Monck supposed: "In the Category of Unity I presume we should stop at the first term of the Time–series: for the Category of Plurality we should represent the addition of unit to unit without laying down any determinate limit; and for the Category of Totality we should limit the number of units and complete the addition up to this number."
- The categories of quality all have degrees of reality as their schema. Quality is related to the content of real being in time. Kant metaphorically explained the schema of quality as the filling up of time with a sensation. Monck paraphrased Kant as saying, "We may speak of time as being more completely filled when the sensation is more vivid, and less completely filled when the sensation is weaker. If the sensation is sufficiently vivid the present moment is so filled with it that it seems impossible to attend to, or even be conscious of any other sensation simultaneously; but when it becomes weaker we have leisure to perceive other sensations also. This occurs by degrees. "We can represent this filling as taking place by a gradual increase from zero (empty time) to any given degree of vividness, or by a similar descent from the sensation of the moment to zero." Reality is the experience of sensation in time. Negation is the absence of sensation in time. Limitation is the range of degrees, between the transition from full to empty, by which things are sensed in time. But Monck stated that "Again Kant does not here give in detail the Schemata of the Categories of Reality, Negation, and Limitation." He qualifiedly suggested that "In the first case [Reality], we should, perhaps, represent the sensation as occupying the present moment to the exclusion of everything else; in the second [Negation] the sensation as entirely absent from the present moment; in the third [Limitation] the sensation as occupying the present moment along with others.
- "The Schema of the Category of Relation is the Order of Time." In the class of relation, each category has its own schema. Substance's schema is the permanence of the unchanging substance (subject) to which accidents (predicates) belong, or the permanence of the object in time. Causality's schema is the necessary succession of a consequent to an antecedent. That is, "… the Schema of the Category of Cause is its regular Antecedence in Time (i.e. Succession in Time determined by fixed law)." The category of community has the schema of the necessary coexistence of the accidents of one substance with the accidents of another substance. This communal interaction consists of the changing accidents of one substance having their cause in the changing accidents of another substance, and vice versa. This can be understood as "… the Simultaneity of objects in Time."
- "The Schema of the Category of Modality according to Kant is Time itself as related to the Existence of the object." In the class of modality, the category of possibility has the schema of possibility at any time. The schema of actual existence at a certain time belongs to the category of existence. Finally, the category of necessity has the schema of being an object at all times.

Even though Kant provided these illustrations and examples of schemata, author John Mahaffy claimed that the topic remained obscure. He wrote, "I may add, that these illustrations of the various schemata are developed and explained by the succeeding chapters on the Principles which embody them, and that it is impossible to make them clear to the reader until he has studied the theory of the Principles."

===== Schematized and unschematized categories =====
The schemata give the categories a "cash value", as though the category is like paper money and sense experience is analogous to precious metal. A schema is the agreement or harmony of a category with sensual phenomena. For example, "Number is the quantity of the phenomenon; sensation is the reality of the phenomenon; the permanence and endurance of things is the substance of the phenomenon, eternity is the necessity of the phenomenon, etc." In this way, the schemata restrict the categories to conditions of sensibility. "Schematism and the schemas thus have the property of 'realizing' the categories at the same time as restricting their scope to appearances." Categories cannot be realized in objects that are not detectable by the senses, that is, are not phenomenal objects (objects that appear to an observer).

"The schemata of the pure concepts of the understanding are, therefore, the true and sole conditions for providing these concepts with a reference to objects and hence with signification. And therefore the categories have, in the end, no other use than a possible empirical one." In order for categories to refer to perceived, experienced objects, they must be schematized. If a category is not schematized, then it has no reference to perception. An unschematized category can be thought, but can not be known. If something can never be perceived, it can never be known. Schemata represent things in general as they appear, not as they might otherwise exist. "Categories, therefore, without schemata are only functions of the understanding necessary for concepts, but do not themselves represent any object." This act results in the formation of one abstract concept from various perceptions or other concepts. With the transcendental determination of time as the transcendental schema, " … use of the categories is clearly restricted to the range of things that fall within time — meaning, for Kant, restricted to phenomena." Metaphysical entities that are not related to time, such as spontaneous or uncaused movements, immortal souls, and eternal gods, are products of unschematized categories. They can be thought, but not known.

===== Unschematized concepts =====
Two kinds of concepts do not use schemata in order to exhibit their empirical bases: rational concepts (ideas of reason), and Platonic Ideas. With these concepts or ideas, there is no intermediate nexus between abstract entity and concrete sense perception. These unschematized concepts do not contain or subsume a representation of an object that is the basis of a concept.

Kant listed three rational concepts or ideas of reason: God, freedom, and immortality. They are not found in experience. “…[T]he difficulty about ideas of reason is that ‘absolutely no intuition commensurate with these can be given’ (Critique of Judgment, § 59).” “To make sense of such ideas we must accordingly have recourse to an alternative procedure, in which use is made of ‘symbols’ as opposed to schemata proper. What happens here is...that we find some empirically intuitable situation which can serve as a model by reference to which the idea can be made comprehensible.” For example, Kant tried to show how sense can be made of the idea of an unseen God “by making a [loving or angry] father’s relationship to his children the [metaphorical, figurative] symbol of God’s relationship to the world.” The rational idea of a non-deterministic occurrence can be spoken of in reference to the analogies of the universe as a mechanism [such as a clock] or organism. Thus, while pure concepts of understanding, empirical, and pure sensible concepts are directly exhibited and made sensible through schemata, ideas of reason are indirectly exhibited through relations by the use of symbolic analogy.

W. H. Walsh attempted to explain how schemata are used to make sense of, or exhibit, the twelve Kantian categories (pure concepts of the understanding) while symbolic analogous relationships are used for the three rational concepts (ideas of reason). "It may be useful in this connection to compare what Kant says about the schematization, or quasi-schematization, of ideas of reason with what he says about the schematization of categories. The problem in the two cases is in essentials identical: how to make a concrete use of concepts which are by nature remote from sense. To show that such a use is possible we need, in Kant’s technical terminology, to find intuitions corresponding to them. In the case of pure concepts of the understanding this can be done, since we can point to the appropriate schemata; the difficulty about ideas of reason is just that 'absolutely no intuition commensurate with them can be given' (Critique of Judgment, §59). To make sense of such ideas [of reason] we must accordingly have recourse to an alternative procedure, in which use is made of ‘symbols’ as opposed to schemata proper. What happens here is, roughly, that we find some empirically intuitable situation which can serve as a model by reference to which the idea [of reason] can be made comprehensible. The idea of God, for example, is incapable of being schematized, but we can nevertheless make partial sense of it for certain purposes by making a father's relationship to his children the symbol of God's relationship to the world....What is noteworthy in this discussion...is...the sharp contrast drawn between schema and symbol, and hence between the meaningfulness of categories and that of ideas [of reason]....every concept capable of schematization...seems to allow that the relationship between idea [of reason] and symbol is altogether less intimate: symbolizing is a relatively arbitrary process, and hence each idea [of reason] can be symbolized in a variety of ways." A category has one transcendental schema; an idea of reason can have multiple symbols for its analogy.

Plato’s Ideas (also known as notions, forms, paradigms, or archetypes) are concepts that function as patterns or models. They are related to objects in the experienced world Ideas are related to natural objects or their perceptual representations by the processes of participating, partaking, and copying. “The particular objects which we perceive are imperfect copies or reflections of the eternal patterns.”

===== Link to the Unconscious =====
In von Hartmann’s Philosophy of the Unconscious he declared that Kantian Transcendental Schemata connect unconscious Categories to conscious knowledge. Kant’s Pure Concepts of the Understanding, or Categories, are unconscious representations or ideas that lie beyond knowledge. According to von Hartmann, these unconscious Categories produce conscious knowledge through the mediation of the Schemata of the Pure Understanding.

== Alternative schemata ==
Kant said that the schema of a concept is the representation of a general procedure of the imagination by which an image can be supplied for a concept. Kant claimed that time is the only proper and appropriate transcendental schema because it shares the a priori category's generality and purity as well as any a posteriori phenomenon's manner of appearance. However, it may be true that time is not the only possible schema.

=== Space ===
"Even more remarkable, however, is the fact that in order to understand the possibility of things as consequent upon the categories, and hence in order to establish the categories' objective reality, we need not merely intuitions but indeed always outer intuitions." Since space is the form of all appearances of the outer senses, it may seem that space could serve as a schema. Indeed, any phenomenon that requires space, as well as time, as a form would also need a spatial schema. "This suggests that he may have thought at one point of recasting the Schematism argument in a fundamental way, by substituting space for time; but if he had this idea, he did not carry it out." In the editor's introduction to his translation of the Critique, Paul Guyer asserted that "…although the content of the transcendental schemata for the categories may be explicated in purely temporal terms, the use of these schemata in turn depends upon judgments about the spatial properties and relations of at least some objects of empirical judgment." Guyer claimed that this declaration was clarified in Kant's "The System of All Principles" section. In this way, the use of schemata is supposed to involve both space and time, instead of merely time.

Norman Kemp Smith claimed that there is apparently no good reason why Kant did not consider space to also be a transcendental schema for his Categories. Kemp Smith argued that consciousness of space is as fundamental as that of time. He concluded that "…Kant’s concentration on the temporal aspect of experience is exceedingly arbitrary…." and therefore without reason. Experience, Kant had claimed, is always spatio-temporal. Inner sense, however, may be exclusively temporal. Kemp Smith then guessed, in opposition to his earlier statement, why Kant ignored space as a transcendental schema. "Possibly Kant’s very natural preoccupation with his new revolutionary doctrine of inner sense and productive imagination has something to do with the matter [i.e., is the reason for his elimination of space]." Thus, Kant's doctrine of inner sense and its emphasis on time resulted in his exclusion of space as a transcendental schema.

A. C. Ewing claimed that the reason that Kant did not use space as a transcendental schema was because space is not needed in order to understand the relational concepts of substance or causality. According to Ewing, Kant did intend to use space as a transcendental schematic mediator between a category and a sensible intuition. Kant, according to Ewing, for one category did use space as a transcendental schema to unify a pure concept with a sensible intuition. Even though space is not needed in order to understand the relations of substance and causality, it is required in order to understand the conceptual relation of community or reciprocity.

Werner Pluhar explained why time, rather than space, is used as a connection to include (subsume) sensory intuition in the Kantian categories or pure concepts of the understanding. “…[A]ll [transcendental] schemata connect the categories with time; the reason for this is that time is the only form of intuition that applies to any intuition whatsoever, even to the inner intuition we have of ourselves, whereas space applies merely to all outer intuitions.” (Immanuel Kant, Critique of Judgment, translated by Werner S. Pluhar, Translator's Introduction, p. xxxvi, Indianapolis: Hackett Publishing Co., 1987)

=== Organism ===
In order to show how time may not be the only schema, Walsh suggested that there is "… the possibility of making sense of the categories in organic as opposed to mechanical terms." He hypothesized that "Elements in an organic complex would here take the place of elements in a temporal situation. Substance might be interpreted in terms of growth and form as opposed to what underlies mechanical change, and causality be thought of in terms of purpose and function." However, Walsh concluded that Kant's choice of time as schema was more precise than any alternative choices. In spite of the general difficulty in understanding Schematism, he asserted that "… Kant's doctrine of schematism, if not altogether satisfactory at the theoretical level, will continue to stand on the strong empirical ground that the schemata offered do enable us to give real meaning to the categories and find for them a genuine use."

== Schemata of systematic unity ==
In his discussion of the Architectonic of Pure Reason, Kant utilized the concept of schema in a way that was similar to his discussion of the schemata of the Categories. A science's whole systematic organization consists of parts. The parts are various cognitions or units of knowledge. The parts are united under one idea which determines the relation of the parts to each other and also the purpose of the whole system. A schema is needed to execute, carry out, or realize this unifying idea and put it into effect. This schema is a sketch or outline of the way that the parts of knowledge are organized into a whole system of science. A schema which is sketched, designed, or drafted in accordance with accidental, empirical purposes results in mere technical unity. But a schema that is drawn up from an a priori rational idea is the foundational outline of architectonic unity. Science must have architectonic unity. "For the schema of what we call science must contain the whole's outline (monogramma) and the whole's division into parts in conformity with the idea — i.e., it must contain these a priori — and must distinguish this whole from all others with certainty and according to principles." This use of the concept of schema is similar to Kant's previous use. It is a minimal outline, monogram, or diagram that realizes or executes an abstract, general concept or idea (Idee) as actual, perceptual experience.

== Criticism ==
Obscurity of the concept "schema"

Kant introduced the concept of the transcendental schema in his chapter entitled "Of the Schematism of the Pure Concepts of the Understanding." It is considered to be one of Kant's more difficult chapters. Even though he knew that he was not writing for a popular readership, Kant twice tried to apologize for this chapter by calling it "very dry" and "dry and tedious." Kant entered into his 1797 notebook: "In general, the schematism is one of the most difficult points. – Even Herr Beck cannot find his way about in it." W. H. Walsh, of the University of Edinburgh, wrote: "The chapter on Schematism probably presents more difficulties to the uncommitted but sympathetic reader than any other part of the Critique of Pure Reason. Not only are the details of the argument highly obscure (that, after all, is a common enough experience in reading Kant, though one is not often so baffled as one is here): it is hard to say in plain terms what general point or points Kant is seeking to establish." Arthur Schopenhauer referred to it as "…the strange 'Chapter on the Schematism of the Pure Concepts of the Understanding,' which is well known for its great obscurity, since no one has ever been able to make anything out of it." Schopenhauer's notebooks contained entries that described Kant's chapter on schemata as "an audacious piece of nonsense" and the schema as "an absurdity whose non–existence is plain." Schopenhauer also remarked on "...the futility of such intermediate things between intuitive perception and concepts." In Schopenhauer's criticism of Kant's schemata, he attempted to clear up the obscurity by attributing Kant's concept of schemata simply to a psychological need for architectonic symmetry in his writings. Empirical concepts are based on empirical perceptions. Kant, however, tried to claim that, analogously, pure concepts (Categories) also have a basis. But this contradicts his previous assertion that pure concepts simply exist in the human mind and are not based on pure, schematic perceptions. Schopenhauer also alleged that schemata were introduced merely to give plausibility to Kant's description of the categories or pure concepts of the understanding. The article on Kant in the Encyclopedia of Philosophy calls Kant's schematism a "baffling doctrine " with "cryptic sentences." Josiah Royce referred to "the perplexing doctrine of the Schema." The Scottish philosopher Robert Adamson wrote: "Kant's manner of explaining the functions of schematism is extremely apt to be misunderstood, and to mislead." Kant's early critics (1782 –1789) did not discuss schematism because they couldn't follow Kant's explanation. Heidegger wrote of "the dryness and tediousness of this analysis…." After more than two centuries, Kant's explanation of schema still seems to be unclear to many readers. In their book on parallel distributed processing, the PDP Research Group discussed Kant's schemata when they appropriated that word to designate their concept of image schemata. "The schema," they wrote, "throughout history, has been a concept shrouded in mystery. Kant's … use of the term has been provocative but difficult to understand." After this sentence, no further attempt was made to discuss Kant's term and the concept that it designates. H. H. Price, in Thinking and Experience, page 292, referred to Kant's Schema and wrote, "…I must confess I do not fully understand it." In 2004, Georges Dicker of SUNY Brockport stated: "I find the Schematism especially opaque…." Kant scholar Norman Kemp Smith judged the schematism chapter to be a "highly artificial argument." Kant's explanation seems, to Kemp Smith, to be contrived and to have no natural progression. Hermann Weyl described his reaction to Kant: "While I had no trouble making this part of Kant’s teaching [regarding a priori space and a priori synthetic judgments] my own, I still had much trouble with the Schematism of Pure Mental Concepts…." In his English lectures, published in 1796, Kant's pupil Friedrich August Nitsch warned his listeners and readers against the difficulty in comprehending Kant's concept of the schema. He wrote: "It will require great efforts of abstraction in the reader to conceive the Schematism of the intellect, in a perfectly clear manner. In his essay "Kant’s Conception of the Categories," T. K. Seung called "…the 'Schematism,' perhaps the most oracular chapter of the Critique….". Eva Schaper wrote that “Schematism…has posed problems for interpreters, and many have wondered whether Kant’s thought had fully matured at the time he wrote it.”

According to Kant, a transcendental schema is a mediating nexus, a third thing (tertium quid; ein Drittes), between a pure concept and a phenomenon. This mediation was never satisfactorily explained by Kant, and Charles Sanders Peirce declared that it is a major part of Kant's system. Kant's "doctrine of the schemata can only have been an afterthought…," Peirce wrote. The theory of mediating schemata was "an addition to his system after it was substantially complete." The enormous importance of the concept of the transcendental schema was emphasized by Peirce when he wrote that "if the schemata had been considered early enough, they would have overgrown his whole work."

Discrepancies

According to W. H. Walsh, there is an apparent discrepancy in Kant's central arguments about schematism. Kant, according to Walsh, first claimed that empirical concepts do not require schemata. Only pure concepts need schemata in order to be realized. This is because pure concepts are totally different from intuitions, whereas, empirical concepts are abstracted from intuitions and are therefore homogeneous with them. But in another part of his chapter, Kant states that mathematical concepts have schemata. "In fact," he wrote, "it is schemata, not images of objects, that lie at the basis of our pure sensible (i.e., geometrical) concepts." In discussing schematism as the method of representing in one image a certain mathematical quantity according to a certain concept, he wrote: "This representation of a general procedure of the imagination by which a concept receives its image, I call the schema of such concept." With regard to pure concepts, Kant then declares, "The schema of a pure concept of the understanding, on the contrary, is something which can never be made into an image … ."

Kant, according to Walsh, has two distinct ways of describing schemata. "Sometimes, as at the beginning of his discussion, he speaks as if a schema were a feature of things which could be pointed to … ". In another place, Kant " … speaks as if schematism were a procedure … ."

== Adamson's interpretation ==
Scottish philosopher Robert Adamson wrote from a Hegelian standpoint. He believed that Kant's analysis of knowledge into the separate topics of intuition, schema, and concept was mechanical and artificial. Adamson claimed that "Thought and Intuition are organically united in the schema." "We are not to suppose that the subsumption [of the intuition under the pure notion] is mechanical; that the particular is something distinct from the universal. The union is organic; the particular is only the universal under a special form. The same function of synthesis, which in pure abstraction we call category, is, in realization, the schema, and the intuition is not apart from the schema." Kant's abstract analysis of perceptual knowledge was, according to Adamson, the misleading separation of an organic unity into individual components. He asserted that "… we must on no account regard Notion, Schema, and Intuition, as three parts of perception which would exist in isolation." This amalgamation is typical of the Hegelian dialectic in which two apparent opposites are subsumed or reconciled by a third entity.

== Pluhar's interpretation ==
In the translator's introduction to his version of Kant's Critique of Judgment, Werner Pluhar tried to explain schemata. He noted that perceptual intuitions and Kant's conceptual categories are very different, yet they relate to each other. This exposition by Pluhar paraphrases Kant's doctrine that perceptions are based on concepts. Kant's position can be contrasted with Schopenhauer's opposite teaching that concepts are derived or abstracted from perceptions, thereby giving content to the concepts and allowing them to make sense. This is the very reason why pure concepts, or categories, require schemata. "Something is needed," Pluhar wrote, sharing Kant's viewpoint, "to mediate between intuition in general and the categories, viz., a rule or 'schema' that stipulates what conditions the intuition must meet so that it can match a category." Pluhar then gave a specific example of how time is utilized to accomplish the matching or mediation. His explanation does not resort to presenting schemata through the use of visual analogies such as "sketches" or "outlines." Pluhar's schemata are rules. "In the case of causal relation, the schema is the rule that the effect must follow the cause in time." After providing this particular instance, he declared generally that "…all schemata connect the categories with time…." Pluhar then asserted the reason for this schematic connection: "…time is the only form of intuition that applies to any intuition whatsoever, even to the inner intuition that we have of ourselves, whereas space applies merely to all outer intuitions." Oddly enough, schemata do not have to be added as mediators to the categories of causality and substance. These are already temporalized. Time is intrinsic to the relation between cause and effect. Substance, by its very nature, is a thing that continually endures.

== Watson on time and schematism ==
John Watson, in his discussion of Kantian philosophy, wrote about supposed supersensible, atemporal beings such as God or the soul. Such things are said to have a timeless existence. As such, though, they cannot be known or experienced. Watson asserted that "…whatever cannot be ‘schematized’...cannot be known...." He considered Kantian schematization as "...conforming to the process by which the definite or concrete becomes a possible object in time...." Schematizing an object is representing an object in time. Accordingly, timeless "...supersensible realities...are not capable of being 'schematized,' do not admit of the application to them of the [Kantian] categories and can never become objects of actual sensible experience." "In the Critique of Pure Reason it has been maintained that no knowledge of supersensible realities can be obtained, since such knowledge always implies a process of determining [or schematizing] objects in time, whilst the supersensible is necessarily free from the limits of time." If supersensible objects cannot be schematized because they are not in time, then "…to the supersensible world…the schematized categories have no application….". If a supersensible thing, like God or the soul, is not in time, then it can't be schematized, can't be applied to Kantian categories, and therefore can't be a known object. Such supersensible entities would have to be schematized through the form of time if they were to be known as having sequentially countable magnitude, gradations of intensive reality, permanent substantiality, or successive causality.

== Elaborations of Kant's notion of schema in cognitive science ==
The philosopher Mark Johnson discusses Kant's conception of a schema with respect to developing a theory of the imagination within cognitive science. Johnson's theory makes use of Kant's insights that analogy is the cognitive mechanism which links sensible percepts to their conceptual categories, and that creative analogy—or what Johnson calls conceptual metaphor—is the cognitive mechanism by which we come to have our understanding of those abstract concepts and categories of which we have less direct sensible experience. He proposes that we use imaginative schemata to structure abstract concepts largely in terms a set of spatial analogies he calls image schemata. In Johnson's view, we acquire image schemata primarily from recurrent patterns of experiences in infancy and early childhood, and then reuse these image schemata in a metaphoric fashion both to reason abstractly and as we speak our language.

In an increase of ambiguity and confusion, some cognitive scientists today have appropriated the often–misused technical term "schema" to mean Kantian Category. In his book Cognitive-Behavioral Therapy: Basic Principles and Applications (Jason Aronson Publishers, 1996), Robert L. Leahy of the American Institute for Cognitive Therapy in New York City and the Weill Cornell Medical College of Cornell University exemplifies this misuse. In Chapter 2, "Historical Context of Cognitive Therapy," he wrote of how, for Kant, "reality is never directly knowable, but rather is 'known' through 'categories of thinking.'" Leahy then stated, "According to Kant, all knowledge was based on the 'categories' (which today we would call schemas). Consequently, reality was never directly knowable--we only knew the schemas." In this way, Kant's concept of "category," or "pure concept of the understanding," is no longer defined as being a predicate, property, quality, or characteristic of any and all objects in general. A Kantian Category is now vaguely considered by cognitive scientists to be a "schema," which was a term that Kant had already used to designate the subsumption of an empirical intuition, through time, under a category or pure concept.

== See also ==
- Category (Kant)
- Image schema
- Schema (psychology)
- Schopenhauer's criticism of the Kantian philosophy
- Schopenhauer's criticism of Kant's schemata
- Semiotic theory of Charles Sanders Peirce

== Bibliography ==
- Adamson, Robert, On the Philosophy of Kant, 1879
- Caygill, Howard, A Kant Dictionary, Blackwell. 1995, ISBN 0-631-17535-0
- Ellington, James W., "The Unity of Kant's Thought in His Philosophy of Corporeal Nature," Philosophy of Material Nature, Hackett, 1985, ISBN 0-915145-88-X
- Heidegger, Martin, Kant and the Problem of Metaphysics, Indiana U. Press, Bloomington, 1962
- Kant, Immanuel, Critique of Pure Reason, Cambridge University Press, 2000, ISBN 0-521-65729-6
- Kant, Immanuel, Critique of Judgment, Translated by Werner S. Pluhar, Hackett, 1987, ISBN 0-87220-025-6
- Kant, Immanuel, Immanuel, First Introduction to the Critique of Judgment, Library of Liberal Arts, 146, Bobbs–Merrill, 1965
- Kant, Immanuel, Immanuel, Prolegomena to any future metaphysics, Bobbs–Merrill, 1976, ISBN 0-672-60187-7
- Kant–Studien, Band 49 (1957), Kölner Universitäts–Verlag
- Stephan Körner, Kant, Penguin Books, 1964, ISBN 0-14-020338-9
- Mahaffy, John P., Kant's Critical Philosophy for English Readers, 1872
- Johnson, Mark, The Body in the Mind: The Bodily Basis of Meaning, Imagination, and Reason, University of Chicago, 1987
- McClelland, J.L., D.E. Rumelhart and the PDP Research Group (1986). Parallel Distributed Processing: Explorations in the Microstructure of Cognition. Volume 2: Psychological and Biological Models, Cambridge, MA: MIT Press, ISBN 0-262-13218-4
- Monck, William H.S., Introduction to the Critical Philosophy, 1874
- Schopenhauer, Arthur, The World as Will and Representation, Vol. I, Dover, 1969, ISBN 0-486-21761-2
- Schopenhauer, Arthur, Manuscript Remains, Vol. 2, Berg Publishers Limited, 1988, ISBN 0-85496-539-4
- The Encyclopedia of Philosophy, Volume 3, Macmillan, 1972
- von Hartmann, Eduard, Philosophy of the Unconscious, New York: Harcourt, Brace & Co., 1931
- Walsh, W. H., "Schematism", Kant–Studien, Band 49 (1957), Kölner Universitäts–Verlag, 1957
