= Robert Leahy =

Robert or Bob Leahy may refer to:

- Robert L. Leahy (born 1946), psychologist and author
- Bob Leahy (American football) (born 1946), American football player and coach
- Bob Leahy (broadcaster), New Zealand radio and television broadcaster

== See also ==
- Robert Leahy Fair, United States Army general
