= On the Fourfold Root of the Principle of Sufficient Reason =

1813 German-language doctoral dissertation by Schopenhauer

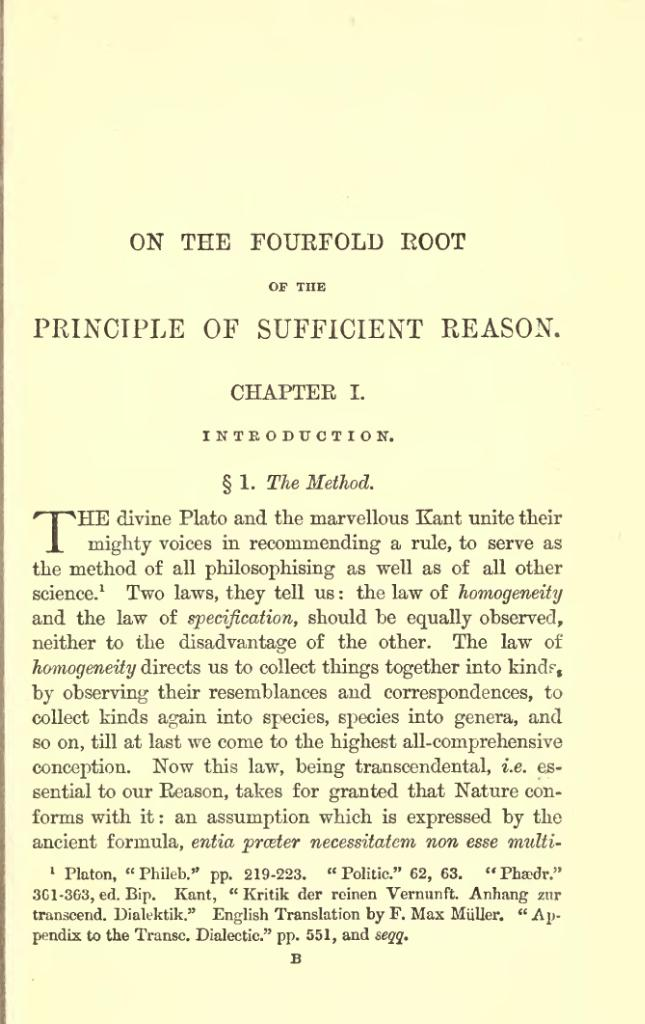
First page of the 1903 English translation

On the Fourfold Root of the Principle of Sufficient Reason (German: Ueber die vierfache Wurzel des Satzes vom zureichenden Grunde) is an elaboration on the classical principle of sufficient reason, written by German philosopher Arthur Schopenhauer as his doctoral dissertation in 1813. The principle of sufficient reason is a powerful and controversial philosophical principle stipulating that everything must have a reason or cause. Schopenhauer revised and re-published it in 1847. The work articulated the centerpiece of many of Schopenhauer's arguments, and throughout his later works he consistently refers his readers to it as the necessary beginning point for a full understanding of his further writings.

== Background ==
=== Historical ===
In January 1813, after suffering their disastrous defeat in Russia, the first remnants of Napoleon's Grande Armée were arriving in Berlin. The sick and wounded quickly filled up the hospitals, and the risk of an epidemic grew high. A patriotic, militaristic spirit inflamed the city and most of the populace, philosophers and students included, entertained the hope that the French yoke could be violently thrown off. All this rapidly became intolerable to Schopenhauer who ultimately fled the city, retreating to the small town of Rudolstadt near Weimar. It was here, from June to November of that year, whilst staying at an inn, that the work was composed.

After submitting it as his doctoral dissertation he was awarded a PhD from the University of Jena in absentia. Private publication soon followed. "There were three reviews of it, commending it condescendingly. Scarcely more than one hundred copies were sold, the rest was remaindered and, a few years later, pulped." Among the reasons for the cold reception of this original version are that it lacked the author's later authoritative style and appeared decidedly unclear in its implications. A copy was sent to Johann Wolfgang von Goethe, who responded by inviting the author to his home on a regular basis, ostensibly to discuss philosophy but in reality to recruit the young philosopher into work on his Theory of Colors.

In 1847 Schopenhauer rewrote and enlarged the work, publishing a new edition. This is the version of the work that is read today. "There the lines of thought are firmly pursued, linking up with his main work; there a challenge is issued to philosophical tradition, and there is no curb on attacks against the philosophical spirit of the age."

=== Philosophical ===
Schopenhauer’s epistemology, by direct admission, begins with Immanuel Kant's theory of knowledge. Schopenhauer proclaimed himself a Kantian who had appropriated his predecessor's most powerful accomplishment in epistemology, and who then claimed to have merely extended and completed what Kant botched or had left undone.

In Schopenhauer’s point of view, Kant’s chief merit lies in his distinction between the thing-in-itself and the phenomenal world in which it appears, i.e., the world as we represent it to ourselves. What is crucial here is the realization that what makes human experience universally possible to begin with without exception, is the perceiving mind. The intellect synthesizes perceptions from raw sensations to consequently abstract modified concepts built upon formed perceptions. Schopenhauer appropriates Kant’s forms of sensibility (space, time, and causality) and expands them into what he calls the understanding:

To know causality is the sole function of the understanding, its only power, and it is a great power embracing much, manifold in its application, and yet unmistakable in its identity throughout all its manifestations. Conversely, all causality, hence all matter, and consequently the whole of reality, is only for the understanding, through the understanding, in the understanding. The first, simplest, ever-present manifestation of understanding is perception of the actual world. This is in every way knowledge of the cause from the effect, and therefore all perception is intellectual.

Thus, our understanding does not exist independent of our ability to perceive and determine relationships anchored in experience itself. Not only what we think in the abstract, but also our very perceptions are completely intellectual and subjectively determined via extraction, new formation, and modified formulation. Already we have the philosophical grounds for Nietzsche’s perspectivism, though given in different language: representation (Vorstellung). One may also translate "Vorstellung" as the English word "idea" – indeed, Schopenhauer himself provides this translation from Kant's similar use of "Vorstellungen." However, this "idea" is semantically distinct both from the Platonic Idea (which Schopenhauer insists be expressed with the German "Ideen") and from Berkeley's use of "idea."

== The world as representation ==
Schopenhauer’s central proposition is the main idea of his entire philosophy, he states simply as “The world is my representation”. The rest of his work is an elaborate analysis and explanation of this sentence, which begins with his Kantian epistemology, but finds thorough elaboration within his version of the principle of sufficient reason. This is responsible for providing adequate explanations for any ‘thing,’ or object that occurs in relation to a subject of knowing; of any representation possible there is always a possible question of 'why?' that one can address to it. It amounts to what Schopenhauer has done, in his view, to extend and complete what Kant began in his Critique of Pure Reason.

== The four classes ==
Four classes of explanation fall under the principle’s rubric. Hence, four classes of objects occur always and already only in relation to a known subject, according to a correlative capacity within the subject. These classes are summarized as follows:

- Becoming: Only with the combination of time and space does perceptual actuality become possible for a subject, allowing for ideas of interpretation, and this provides the ground of becoming judgment. This is the law of causality, which is, when considered subjectively, intellectual and a priori-linked understanding. All possible judgments that are inferences of a cause from an effect—a physical state any subject infers as caused by another physical state or vice versa—presumes this as primary ground for the expected potentials of such judgments. The natural sciences operate within this aspect of expanding principles. Schopenhauer proposed a proof of the a priori of causality (i.e. that the universe indeed operates, at least in general, as causal instead of just being perceived so a posteriori, due to the repeatability of sequences) that remains different from Kantian Theory. Proof relies on the intellectuality of perceived things (representations)—these are produced by "projecting causality backwards in time," from physical excitations of cells and nerves (this is the afferent role of the intellect, or brain)—and is apparently influenced by the medieval philosopher Witelo and his work on optics and the psychology of seeing.
- Knowing: This class of objects subsumes all judgments, or abstract concepts, which a subject knows through conceptual, discursive reason rooted in the ground of knowing. The other three classes of objects are immediate representations, while this class is always and already composed of fixed representations of representations. Therefore, the truth-value of concepts abstracted from any of the other three classes of objects is grounded in referring to something outside the concept. Concepts are abstract judgments grounded in intuitions of time and space, ideas of perception (causality apparent in the outer world), or acts of direct will (causality experienced from within). That conceptions are easier to deal with than representations; they are, in fact, to these almost as the formula of higher arithmetic to the mental operations which give rise to them and which they represent, or as logarithm to its number. This class makes language (in the form of abstract judgments that are then communicable) possible, and as a consequence, all the sciences become possible.
- Being: Time and space comprise separate grounds of being. These a priori (prior to experience) forms respectively allow for an “inner,” temporal sense and an “outer,” spatial sense for the subject; subjectively, these are the forms of pure sensibility—they make sensations possible for a subject. The first makes arithmetic possible, and is presupposed for all other forms of the principle of sufficient reason; the other makes geometry possible. Time is one dimensional and purely successive; each moment determines the following moment; in space, any position is determined only in its relations to all other positions [fixed baselines] in a finite, hence, closed system. Thus, intuitions of time and space provide the grounds of being that make arithmetical and geometrical judgments possible, which are also valid for experience.
- Willing: It is possible for a subject of knowing to know himself directly as ‘will.’ A subject knows his acts of will (efferent actions) only after the fact, in time. Action then, finds its root in the law of motivation, the ground of acting, which is causality, but seen from the inside (afferent perception). In other words, not only does a subject know his body as an object of outer sense (efferently), in space, but also in an inner sense (afferently), in time alone; a subject has self-consciousness in addition to knowing his body as an idea of perception (afferent-efferent processes/a priori–a posteriori correlations).

Why does a subject act the way he does? Where a sufficient motive appears in the form either of an intuition, perception, or extracted abstract conception, the subject will act (or react) according to his character, or ‘will.’ e.g., despite all plans to the contrary. When the actual moment comes to act, we do so within the constituents of the rhetorical situation (the various representations presented within subjective experiences) and may be often surprised by what we actually say and do. The human sciences find their ground in this aspect of the principle.

== Conclusion ==
Different rules govern the possible explanations for representations of the four classes and “every explanation given in accordance with this guiding line is merely relative. It [the principle of sufficient reason] explains things in reference to one another, but it always leaves unexplained something that it presupposes,” and the two things that are absolutely inexplicable are the principle itself and the “thing in itself”, which Schopenhauer connects with the will to live. The principle, in another point of view, provides the general form of any given perspective, presupposing both subject and object. The thing in itself, consequently, remains forever unknowable from any standpoint, for any qualities attributed to it are merely perceived, i.e., constructed in the mind from sensations given in time and space. Furthermore, because the concepts we form from our perceptions cannot in any way refer with any validity to anything beyond these limits to experience, all proofs for the existence of God or anything beyond the possibility of experience fall away under the razor of Kant’s critique. Kant termed this critical or transcendental idealism. Important to note here is that “Transcendental” does not refer to knowing the unknowable, but rather it refers to the a priori intellectual conditions for experience. This intuition of the a priori understanding is a modern elucidation of the postmodern expression "always already": time and space always and already determine the possibilities of experience. Additionally, Schopenhauer distinguishes from this something he calls a "spurious a priori": cultural perspectives (ideologies) one is born into that determine one's relationship to experience, in addition to the forms of space and time. He considers these false because it is possible to investigate and uncover their grounds, leading to a reorientation that regards the phenomena of experience as source material of new knowledge, rather than one's always already prejudices about phenomena.

== Payne's summary ==
In his Translator's Introduction to Schopenhauer's The World as Will and Representation, E. F. J. Payne concisely summarized the Fourfold Root.

Our knowing consciousness...is divisible solely into subject and object. To be object for the subject and to be our representation or mental picture are one and the same. All our representations are objects for the subject, and all objects of the subject are our representations. These stand to one another in a regulated connection which in form is determinable a priori, and by virtue of this connection nothing existing by itself and independent, nothing single and detached, can become an object for us. ...The first aspect of this principle is that of becoming, where it appears as the law of causality and is applicable only to changes. Thus if the cause is given, the effect must of necessity follow. The second aspect deals with concepts or abstract representations, which are themselves drawn from representations of intuitive perception, and here the principle of sufficient reason states that, if certain premises are given, the conclusion must follow. The third aspect of the principle is concerned with being in space and time, and shows that the existence of one relation inevitably implies the other, thus that the equality of the angles of a triangle necessarily implies the equality of its sides and vice versa. Finally, the fourth aspect deals with actions, and the principle appears as the law of motivation, which states that a definite course of action inevitably ensues on a given character and motive.
