= Noumenon =

Object or event that exists independently of the senses

In philosophy, a noumenon (/ˈnuːmənɒn/, /ˈnaʊ-/; from Ancient Greek: νοούμενoν; pl.: noumena) is knowledge posited as an object that exists independently of human sense. The term noumenon is generally used in contrast with, or in relation to, the term phenomenon, which refers to any object of the senses. Immanuel Kant first developed the notion of the noumenon as part of his transcendental idealism, suggesting that while we know the noumenal world to exist because human sensibility is merely receptive, it is not itself sensible and must therefore remain otherwise unknowable to us. In Kantian philosophy, the noumenon is often associated with the unknowable "thing-in-itself" (German: Ding an sich). However, the nature of the relationship between the two is not made explicit in Kant's work, and remains a subject of debate among Kant scholars as a result.

== Etymology ==
The Greek word νοούμενoν, nooúmenon (plural νοούμενα, nooúmena) is the neuter middle-passive present participle of νοεῖν, noeîn, 'to think, to mean', which in turn originates from the word νοῦς, noûs, an Attic contracted form of νόος, nóos, 'perception, understanding, mind'. (Note: Ontology) A rough equivalent in English would be "that which is thought", or "the object of an act of thought".

== Historical predecessors ==
The Indian Vedānta philosophy (specifically Advaita), the roots of which go back to the Vedic period, talks of the ātman (self) in similar terms as the noumenon.

Regarding the equivalent concepts in Plato, Ted Honderich writes: "Platonic Ideas and Forms are noumena, and phenomena are things displaying themselves to the senses... This dichotomy is the most characteristic feature of Plato's dualism; that noumena and the noumenal world are objects of the highest knowledge, truths, and values is Plato's principal legacy to philosophy."

== Kantian noumena ==
=== Overview ===
As expressed in Kant's Critique of Pure Reason, human understanding is structured by "concepts of the understanding" or pure categories of understanding, found prior to experience in the mind and which make outer experiences possible as counterpart to the rational faculties of the mind.

By Kant's account, when one employs a concept to describe or categorize noumena (the objects of inquiry, investigation, or analysis of the workings of the world), one is also employing a way of describing or categorizing phenomena (the observable manifestations of those objects of inquiry, investigation or analysis). Kant posited methods by which human understanding makes sense of and thus intuits phenomena that appear to the mind: the concepts of the transcendental aesthetic, as well as that of the transcendental analytic, transcendental logic and transcendental deduction. Taken together, Kant's "categories of understanding" are the principles of the human mind which necessarily are brought to bear in attempting to understand the world in which we exist (that is, to understand, or attempt to understand, "things in themselves"). In each instance the word "transcendental" refers to the process that the human mind must exercise to understand or grasp the form of, and order among, phenomena. Kant asserts that to "transcend" a direct observation or experience is to use reason and classifications to strive to correlate with the phenomena that are observed. Humans can make sense out of phenomena in these various ways, but in doing so can never know the "things-in-themselves", the actual objects and dynamics of the natural world in their noumenal dimension - this being the negative, correlate to phenomena and that which escapes the limits of human understanding. By Kant's Critique, our minds may attempt to correlate in useful ways, perhaps even closely accurate ways, with the structure and order of the various aspects of the universe, but cannot know these "things-in-themselves" (noumena) directly. Rather, we must infer the extent to which the human rational faculties can reach the object of "things-in-themselves" by our observations of the manifestations of those things that can be perceived via the physical senses, that is, of phenomena, and by ordering these perceptions in the mind help infer the validity of our perceptions to the rational categories used to understand them in a rational system. This rational system (transcendental analytic), being the categories of the understanding as free from empirical contingency.

According to Kant, objects of which we are cognizant via the physical senses are merely representations of unknown somethings—what Kant refers to as the transcendental object—as interpreted through the a priori or categories of the understanding. These unknown somethings are manifested within the noumenon—although we can never know how or why as our perceptions of these unknown somethings via our physical senses are bound by the limitations of the categories of the understanding and we are therefore never able to fully know the "thing-in-itself".

=== Noumenon and the thing-in-itself ===
Many accounts of Kant's philosophy treat "noumenon" and "thing-in-itself" as synonymous, and there is textual evidence for this relationship. But Stephen Palmquist holds that "noumenon" and "thing-in-itself" are only loosely synonymous, inasmuch as they represent the same concept viewed from two different perspectives, and other scholars also argue that they are not identical. Schopenhauer criticised Kant for changing the meaning of "noumenon". But this opinion is far from unanimous. Kant's writings show points of difference between noumena and things-in-themselves. For instance, he regards things-in-themselves as existing:

though we cannot know these objects as things in themselves, we must yet be in a position at least to think them as things in themselves; otherwise we should be landed in the absurd conclusion that there can be appearance without anything that appears.

He is much more doubtful about noumena:

But in that case a noumenon is not for our understanding a special [kind of] object, namely, an intelligible object; the [sort of] understanding to which it might belong is itself a problem. For we cannot in the least represent to ourselves the possibility of an understanding which should know its object, not discursively through categories, but intuitively in a non-sensible intuition.

A crucial difference between the noumenon and the thing-in-itself is that to call something a noumenon is to claim a kind of knowledge, whereas Kant insisted that the thing-in-itself is unknowable. Interpreters have debated whether the latter claim makes sense: it seems to imply that we know at least one thing about the thing-in-itself (i.e., that it is unknowable). But Palmquist argues that this is part of Kant's definition of the term, to the extent that anyone who claims to have found a way of making the thing-in-itself knowable must be adopting a non-Kantian position.

=== Positive and negative noumena ===
Kant also distinguishes between positive and negative noumena:

If by 'noumenon' we mean a thing so far as it is not an object of our sensible intuition, and so abstract from our mode of intuiting it, this is a noumenon in the negative sense of the term.

But if we understand by it an object of a non-sensible intuition, we thereby presuppose a special mode of intuition, namely, the intellectual, which is not that which we possess, and of which we cannot comprehend even the possibility. This would be 'noumenon' in the positive sense of the term.

The positive noumena, if they existed, would be immaterial entities that can only be apprehended by a special, non-sensory faculty: "intellectual intuition" (nicht sinnliche Anschauung). Kant doubts that we have such a faculty, because for him intellectual intuition would mean that thinking of an entity and its being represented would be the same. He argues that we have no way to apprehend positive noumena:

Since, however, such a type of intuition, intellectual intuition, forms no part whatsoever of our faculty of knowledge, it follows that the employment of the categories can never extend further than to the objects of experience. Doubtless, indeed, there are intelligible entities corresponding to the sensible entities; there may also be intelligible entities to which our sensible faculty of intuition has no relation whatsoever; but our concepts of understanding, being mere forms of thought for our sensible intuition, could not in the least apply to them. That, therefore, which we entitle 'noumenon' must be understood as being such only in a negative sense.

=== The noumenon as a limiting concept ===
Even if noumena are unknowable, they are still needed as a limiting concept, Kant tells us. Without them, there would be only phenomena, and since potentially we have complete knowledge of our phenomena, we would in a sense know everything. In his own words:

Further, the concept of a noumenon is necessary, to prevent sensible intuition from being extended to things in themselves, and thus to limit the objective validity of sensible knowledge.

What our understanding acquires through this concept of a noumenon, is a negative extension; that is to say, understanding is not limited through sensibility; on the contrary, it itself limits sensibility by applying the term noumena to things in themselves (things not regarded as appearances). But in so doing it at the same time sets limits to itself, recognising that it cannot know these noumena through any of the categories, and that it must therefore think them only under the title of an unknown something.

Furthermore, for Kant, the existence of a noumenal world limits reason to what he sees as its proper bounds, making many questions of traditional metaphysics, such as the existence of God, the soul, and free will unanswerable by reason. Kant derives this from his definition of knowledge as "the determination of given representations to an object". As these entities do not appear in the phenomenal, Kant can claim that they cannot be known to a mind that works upon "such knowledge that has to do only with appearances". These questions are ultimately the "proper object of faith, but not of reason".

=== The dual-object and dual-aspect interpretations ===
Kantian scholars have long debated two contrasting interpretations of the thing-in-itself. One is the dual object view, according to which the thing-in-itself is an entity distinct from the phenomena to which it gives rise. The other is the dual aspect view, according to which the thing-in-itself and the thing-as-it-appears are two "sides" of the same thing. This view is supported by the textual fact that "Most occurrences of the phrase 'things-in-themselves' are shorthand for the phrase, 'things considered in themselves' (Dinge an sich selbst betrachtet)." Although we cannot see things apart from the way we do in fact perceive them via the physical senses, we can think them apart from our mode of sensibility (physical perception), thus making the thing-in-itself a kind of noumenon or object of thought.

== Criticisms of Kant's noumenon ==
=== Pre-Kantian critique ===
Though the term noumenon did not come into common usage until Kant, the idea that undergirds it, that matter has an absolute existence which causes it to emanate certain phenomena, had historically been criticized. George Berkeley, who predated Kant, asserted that matter, independent of an observant mind, is metaphysically impossible. Qualities associated with matter, such as shape, color, smell, texture, weight, temperature, and sound, all depend on minds, which allow for only relative, not absolute, perception. The complete absence of such minds (and more importantly an omnipotent mind) would render those same qualities unobservable and even unimaginable. Berkeley called this philosophy immaterialism. Essentially there could be no such thing as matter without a mind.

=== Schopenhauer's critique ===
Schopenhauer claimed that Kant used the word noumenon incorrectly. In his "Critique of the Kantian philosophy", which first appeared as an appendix to The World as Will and Representation, he writes:

The difference between abstract and intuitive cognition, which Kant entirely overlooks, was the very one that ancient philosophers indicated as φαινόμενα [phainomena] and νοούμενα [nooumena]; the opposition and incommensurability between these terms proved very productive in the philosophemes of the Eleatics, in Plato's doctrine of Ideas, in the dialectic of the Megarics, and later in the scholastics, in the conflict between nominalism and realism. This latter conflict was the late development of a seed already present in the opposed tendencies of Plato and Aristotle. But Kant, who completely and irresponsibly neglected the issue for which the terms φαινομένα and νοούμενα were already in use, then took possession of the terms as if they were stray and ownerless, and used them as designations of things in themselves and their appearances.

The noumenon's original meaning of "that which is thought" is not compatible with the thing-in-itself, Kant's term for things as they exist apart from their observers' minds. In a footnote to this passage, Schopenhauer provides the following passage from the Outlines of Pyrrhonism (Bk. I, ch. 13) of Sextus Empiricus to demonstrate the original distinction between phenomenon and noumenon according to ancient philosophers: νοούμενα φαινομένοις ἀντετίθη Ἀναξαγόρας ('Anaxagoras opposed what is thought to what appears.')

== See also ==
- Always already
- Anatta
- Condition of possibility
- Essence–energies distinction
- Haecceity
- Hypokeimenon
- Ineffability
- Master argument by George Berkeley
- Observation
- Qualia
- Schopenhauer's criticism of the Kantian philosophy
- Transcendental idealism
- Unobservable
- A priori and a posteriori

== Bibliography ==
- Kant, Immanuel (1999). Critique of Pure Reason (The Cambridge Edition of the Works of Immanuel Kant). Cambridge University Press. ISBN 978-0521657297.
