= Stephen Palmquist =

American philosopher (born 1957)

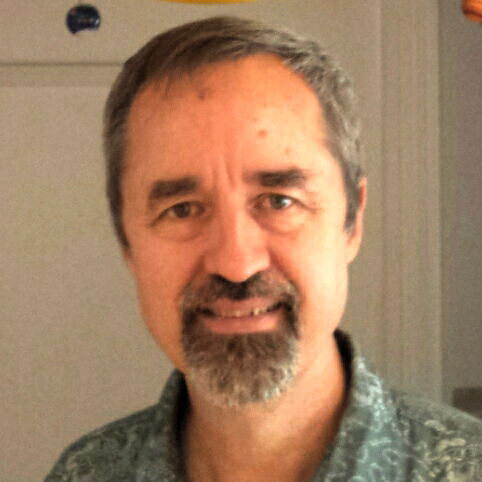
- Palmquist in 2017
- Born: Stephen Richard Palmquist; 1957 (age 68–69); Nome, Alaska, U.S.

Education
- Education: Westmont College; Oxford University
- Doctoral advisor: John Macquarrie; W. H. Walsh

Philosophical work
- Era: Contemporary philosophy
- Region: Western philosophy
- School: Kantianism; Comparative philosophy
- Institutions: Hong Kong Baptist University
- Main interests: Kant, philosophy of religion, philosophy of science, political theology, logic, Chinese philosophy

Stephen Richard Palmquist (born 1957) is an American philosopher, currently living in Los Angeles. He taught philosophy at various universities in Hong Kong from 1987 to 2021. A Patheos article referred to him as "one of the greatest living interpreters of Kant".

== Education and career ==
While attending Westmont College in the late 1970s, Palmquist worked as a part-time youth minister, a job that helped him realize that, instead of becoming a pastor, his real calling was to be a university teacher. Shortly after starting his doctoral studies at Oxford University in October 1980, he realized his calling was to be a philosopher. He completed his PhD in Philosophical Theology under the supervision of John Macquarrie and W. H. Walsh in August 1987. The next month he joined as faculty at Hong Kong Baptist University, at that point still named Baptist College. He played an important role in compiling e-text versions of the various writings of Immanuel Kant. He founded "Kant on the Web", an award-winning website in 1995. The staff profile page describes that his website "was selected as ‘Web site of the month’ by Point of Life (11/03), offered the reputable ‘Study Web Excellence Award’ (6/99), given a ‘Special Mention Award’ by the Churches.com organization (7/98), placed on a list of web sites specially recommended by the Britannica Internet Guide (5/98), won Majon Web Select's prestigious ‘seal of excellence award’ (6/97), and selected as ‘Top 1% of the Web’ by 21st Century Renaissance (6/96)."

Palmquist has more than 200 publications, which have been translated into at least twelve different languages. His writings include 12 books and over 110 refereed articles and book chapters In 2020, he received the HKBU President's Award for Outstanding Performance in Scholarly Work.

== Philosophical work ==
Palmquist's earlier work focused on a "perspectival”"interpretation of Kant's philosophical system: by emphasising the "architectonic" form of reason, he claims to resolve many apparent contradictions in Kant's philosophical writings that have long plagued interpreters. Among the various applications of the perspectival methodology to solving long-standing philosophical problems, one of the most significant is found in his 2016 article, which offers a solution to the Cartesian mind-body problem.

Another major contribution to Kant scholarship is Palmquist’s interpretation of Kant's entire philosophical system as having a "theocentric" orientation, which provides the foundation for a religion and theology that aims at restoring Christianity to its "pure and authentic form". (Note: While this religious and theological application played a role in his early doctoral research, Palmquist's first published defense of his position on Kantian religion came in his 1989 article, "Immanuel Kant: A Christian Philosopher?". See also the response to Anthony Perovich's critique of his position, in Palmquist's follow-up article, "Triangulating God: A Kantian Rejoinder to Perovich".) Central to Palmquist's new paradigm, as argued most fully in his book, Kant's Critical Religion, is the claim that Kant's 1793 book, Religion within the Bounds of Bare Reason, attempts not to reduce religion to morality, but to raise morality to the level of religion: religious faith is necessary to fulfill a genuine need of reason that significantly limits the ability of human beings to be good unless they call upon divine assistance. (Note: For a thorough-going summary of Kant's entire Religion book that takes this non-reductionist assumption fully into account, while also outlining the way Kant's four perspectives play an architectonic role similar to that of the three Critiques, see Palmquist's "Introduction" to Pluhar's translation of Religion within the Bounds of Bare Reason Pluhar was the first translator of Kant's book to adopt Palmquist's suggestion in his 1992 Kant-Studien article that "bare" is the best translation of Kant's use of bloßen in the title of Religion.) In the most significant of his numerous articles supplementing the arguments of Kant's Critical Religion since 2007, Palmquist has traced the roots of panentheism to Kant's philosophy of religion, located the infamous missing argument for the alleged presence of radical evil in human nature in Kant's Religion book, unpacked the logical basis for a previously undetected "religious argument" for God's existence, and demonstrated that Kant was more amenable to a belief in divine grace than has often been assumed. His work on Kant's theory of religion culminated in the publication of Comprehensive Commentary on Kant’s Religion within the Bounds of Bare Reason, which presents the entire text of Kant's Religion in a thoroughly revised translation and incorporates insights from the relevant articles published during the previous decade.

== Hong Kong Philosophy Café ==
In a 1998 interview with the South China Morning Post, Palmquist mentioned his desire to move philosophical practice into the marketplace. Subsequently, he founded the Hong Kong Philosophy Café in 1999 which currently has autonomous branches running concurrently in Hong Kong. The monthly meeting usually is held in the evenings and attracts people from all walks of life. In a 2012 interview on Academic Foresights, he said that the Café had a mailing list of over 700. Talks and discussions at the Café address contemporary metaphysical, political, and economical issues that attract popular media attention In March 2001, a Chinese branch of the Café was also established to meet the needs of Chinese speaking participants.

== Hong Kong Kant Society ==
Palmquist founded the Hong Kong Kant Society in 2015. The Society is an affiliated group of the American Philosophical Association and organizes symposiums, conferences, and various events in Hong Kong related to Kantian studies.

Prior to the setting up the Hong Kong Kant Society, Palmquist organized Asia's first major conference on Kantian scholarship in 2009, the Kant in Asia Conference, whose keynote speakers were Patricia Kitcher, Chung-ying Cheng, and Günter Wolfhart. De Gruyter published the conference proceedings in 2010. Palmquist organized a second Kant in Asia Conference in 2016.

== Major publications ==
- Kant and mysticism: Critique as the experience of baring all in reason's light (2019). (ISBN 9781793604651)
- Kant on Intuition: Western and Asian Perspectives on Transcendental Idealism (Routledge, 2019). (ISBN 978-0-429-49177-1)
- Comprehensive Commentary on Kant's Religion Within the Bounds of Bare Reason (Wiley-Blackwell, 2015)(ISBN 978-1-118-61920-9)
- Cultivating Personhood: Kant and Asian Philosophy, Edited Proceedings of the Kant in Asia international conference (Berlin: Walter de Gruyter, 2010)
- Kant and the New Philosophy of Religion, co-edited with Chris L. Firestone (Bloomington: Indiana University Press, January 2006)
- Kant’s Critical Religion: Volume Two of Kant’s System of Perspectives (London: Ashgate Publishing Company, 2000)
- Kant’s System of Perspectives: An architectonic interpretation of the Critical philosophy (Lanham, MD: University Press of America, 1993)
