= The World as Will and Representation =

1818 book by Arthur Schopenhauer

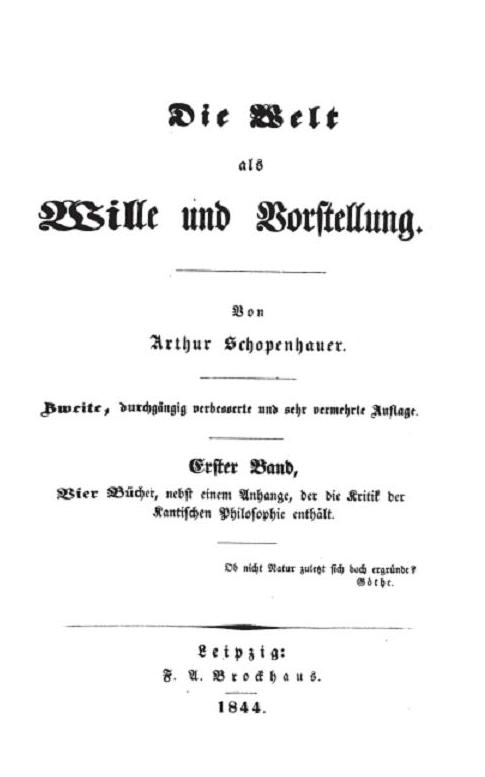
- The title page of the expanded 1844 edition
- Author: Arthur Schopenhauer
- Original title: Die Welt als Wille und Vorstellung
- Translator: R. B. Haldane and J. Kemp; E. F. J. Payne; Richard E. Aquila and David Carus; Judith Norman, Alistair Welchman, and Christopher Janaway
- Language: German
- Subject: Metaphysics
- Published: 1818/19 (1st edition); 1844 (2nd expanded edition); 1859 (3rd expanded edition)
- Publication place: Germany
- Text: The World as Will and Representation at Wikisource

The World as Will and Representation (WWR; German: Die Welt als Wille und Vorstellung), sometimes translated as The World as Will and Idea, is the central work of the German philosopher Arthur Schopenhauer. The first edition was published in late 1818, with the date 1819 on the title page. A second, two-volume edition appeared in 1844: volume one was an edited version of the 1818 edition, while volume two consisted of commentary on the ideas expounded in volume one. A third expanded edition was published in 1859, the year before Schopenhauer's death. In 1948, an abridged version was edited by Thomas Mann.

In the summer of 1813, Schopenhauer submitted his doctoral dissertation—On the Fourfold Root of the Principle of Sufficient Reason—and was awarded a doctorate from the University of Jena. After spending the following winter in Weimar, he lived in Dresden and published his treatise On Vision and Colours in 1816. Schopenhauer spent the next several years working on his chief work, The World as Will and Representation. Schopenhauer asserted that the work is meant to convey a "single thought" from various perspectives. He develops his philosophy over four books covering epistemology, ontology, aesthetics, and ethics. Following these books is an appendix containing Schopenhauer's detailed Criticism of the Kantian Philosophy.

Taking the transcendental idealism of Immanuel Kant as his starting point, Schopenhauer argues that the world humans experience around them—the world of objects in space and time and related in causal ways—exists solely as "representation" (Vorstellung) dependent on a cognizing subject, not as a world that can be considered to exist in itself (i.e., independently of how it appears to the subject's mind). One's knowledge of objects is thus knowledge of mere phenomena rather than things in themselves. Schopenhauer identifies the thing-in-itself — the inner essence of everything — as will: a blind, unconscious, aimless striving devoid of knowledge, outside of space and time, and free of all multiplicity. The world as representation is, therefore, the "objectification" of the will. Aesthetic experiences release one briefly from one’s endless servitude to the will, which is the root of suffering. True redemption from life, Schopenhauer asserts, can only result from the total ascetic negation of the "will to life". Schopenhauer notes fundamental agreements between his philosophy, Platonism, and the philosophy of the ancient Indian Vedas.

Unlike Kant, who argued the "thing-in-itself" was unknowable, Schopenhauer contended that we have a direct, non-representational window into it through our own bodies. He posited that the human body is simply the "objectified Will" made visible in time and space. Furthermore, he argued that the human intellect is not a divine or magical faculty but a purely biological tool—a secondary phenomenon evolved to serve the irrational needs of the Will. This "biological demotion" of the rational mind heavily influenced later thinkers, including Friedrich Nietzsche and Sigmund Freud, and provided an early philosophical precursor to modern evolutionary psychology.

The World as Will and Representation marked the pinnacle of Schopenhauer's philosophical thought; he spent the rest of his life refining, clarifying and deepening the ideas presented in this work without any fundamental changes. The first edition was met with near-universal silence. The second edition of 1844 similarly failed to attract any interest. At the time, post-Kantian German academic philosophy was dominated by the German idealists—foremost among them G. W. F. Hegel, whom Schopenhauer bitterly denounced as a "charlatan".

== English translations ==
In the English language, this work is known under three different titles. Although English publications about Schopenhauer played a role in the recognition of his fame as a philosopher in later life (1851 until his death in 1860) and a three volume translation by R. B. Haldane and J. Kemp, titled The World as Will and Idea, appeared already in 1883–1886, the first English translation of the expanded edition of this work under this title The World as Will and Representation appeared by E. F. J. Payne translated several other works of Schopenhauer) as late as in 1958 (paperback editions in 1966 and 1969). A later English translation by Richard E. Aquila in collaboration with David Carus is titled The World as Will and Presentation (2008). The latest translation by Judith Norman, Alistair Welchman, and Christopher Janaway is titled The World as Will and Representation (Volume 1: 2010, Volume 2: 2018).

There is some debate over the best way to convey, in English, the meaning of Vorstellung, a key concept in Schopenhauer's philosophy that is used in the title of his main work. Schopenhauer uses Vorstellung to describe whatever comes before in the mind in consciousness (as opposed to the will, which is what the world that appears to us as Vorstellung is in itself). In ordinary usage, Vorstellung could be rendered as "idea" (thus the title of Haldane and Kemp's translation). However, Kant uses the Latin term repraesentatio when discussing the meaning of Vorstellung (Critique of Pure Reason A320/B376). Thus, as is commonly done, one might use the English term 'representation' to render Vorstellung (as done by E. F. J. Payne in his translation). Norman, Welchman, and Janaway also use the English term 'representation'. In the introduction, they point out that Schopenhauer uses Vorstellung the same way Kant uses it — 'representation' "stands for anything that the mind is conscious of in its experience, knowledge, or cognition of any form — something that is present to the mind. So our first task in The World as Will and Representation is to consider the world as it presents itself to us in our minds."

In the introduction to his translation with David Carus (first published 2008), Richard E. Aquila argues that the reader will not grasp the details of the philosophy of Schopenhauer properly without rendering Vorstellung as "presentation". It is the notion of a performance or theatrical presentation – of which one is the spectator – that is key in this interpretation. The world that we perceive can be understood as a "presentation" of objects in the theatre of our own mind. Vorstellung can refer to what is presented or to the process of presenting it. Schopenhauer argues that what does the "presenting" – what sets the world as 'presentation' before one – is the cognizant subject itself. The primary sense of Vorstellung used by Schopenhauer, Aquila writes, is that of what is presented to a subject: the presented object (qua presented, as opposed to what it is "in itself"). Aquila argues that translating Vorstellung as 'representation' fails to "bring out the dual notion of that which is 'set before' a cognizant subject as its object, and the presentational activity of the subject therein engaged" and is potentially misleading from Schopenhauer's principal point.

== Relationship to earlier philosophical work ==
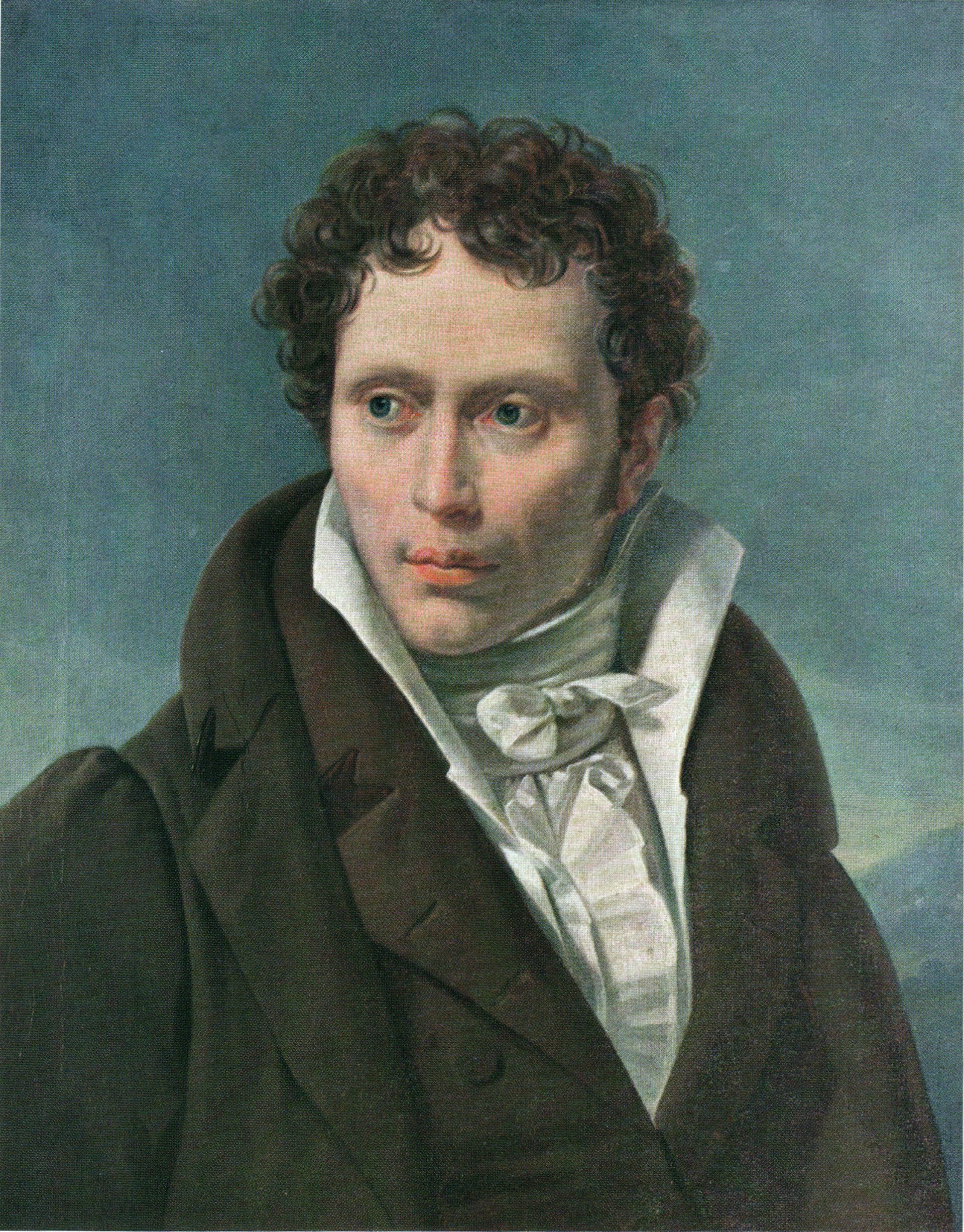
Schopenhauer in 1815, second of the critical five years of the initial composition of Die Welt als Wille und Vorstellung

Schopenhauer demands that his doctoral dissertation On the Fourfold Root of the Principle of Sufficient Reason, which appeared in 1813, be read before WWR as an introduction. Referring to On the Fourfold Root, Schopenhauer states in the preface to the first edition of WWR that it is "absolutely impossible to truly understand the present work unless the reader is familiar with this introduction and propaedeutic, and the contents of that essay are presupposed here as much as if they had been included in the book".

Furthermore, Schopenhauer states at the beginning that his book assumes the reader's prior knowledge of the philosophy of Immanuel Kant. Schopenhauer asserted that his philosophy was the natural continuation of Kant's, and is regarded by some as remaining more faithful to Kant's metaphysical system of transcendental idealism, expounded in the Critique of Pure Reason (1781), than any of the other later German idealists. However, The World as Will and Representation contains an appendix entitled "Critique of the Kantian philosophy", in which Schopenhauer rejects most of Kant's ethics and significant parts of his epistemology and aesthetics. As Schopenhauer explains: "However much I take the achievements of the great Kant as my point of departure, a serious study of his works has nonetheless enabled me to discover significant errors, and I have had to separate these errors out and show them to be unsound so that I could then presuppose and apply what is true and excellent in his theories in a pure form, freed from these errors."

Schopenhauer saw the human will as our one window to the reality behind the world as representation, i.e. the external world as we experience it through our mental faculties. According to Schopenhauer, the will is the 'inner essence' of the entire world, i.e. the Kantian thing-in-itself (Ding an sich), and exists independently of the forms of the principle of sufficient reason that govern the world as representation. Schopenhauer believed that while we may be precluded from direct knowledge of the Kantian noumenon, we may gain knowledge about it to a certain extent (unlike Kant, for whom the noumenon was completely unknowable). This is because, according to Schopenhauer, the relationship between the world as representation and the world as it is 'in itself' can be understood by investigating the relationship between our bodies (material objects, i.e. representations, existing in space and time) and our will. Another important difference between the philosophies of Schopenhauer and Kant is Schopenhauer's rejection of Kant's doctrine of twelve categories of the understanding. Schopenhauer claims that eleven of Kant's categories are superfluous "blind windows" meant for the purposes of architectonic symmetry. Schopenhauer argues that there are three a priori forms by which our minds render our experience of the world intelligible to ourselves: time, space, and causality.

Schopenhauer also states in his introduction that the reader will be at his best prepared to understand the theories in The World as Will and Representation if he has lingered in the school of "the divine Plato": Schopenhauer frequently acknowledges Plato's influence on the development of his theories and, particularly in the context of aesthetics, speaks of the Platonic forms as existing on an intermediate ontological level between the representation and the Will. The reader will be at an even further advantage if they are already familiar with the ancient Indian philosophy contained within the Upanishads.

== Development and structure of the work ==
The development of Schopenhauer's ideas took place very early in his career (1814–1818) and culminated in the publication of the first volume of Will and Representation in 1819. This first volume consisted of four books—covering his epistemology, ontology, aesthetics and ethics, in order. Much later in his life, in 1844, Schopenhauer published a second edition in two volumes, the first a virtual reprint of the original, and the second a new work consisting of clarifications to and additional reflections on the first. His views had not changed substantially.

Schopenhauer states in the preface to the first edition that The World as Will and Representation aims to "convey a single thought." The resulting structure of the work is therefore, in his words, "organic rather than chainlike," with all of the book's earlier parts presupposing the later parts "almost as much as the later ones presuppose the earlier." Each of the work's four main parts function as "four perspectives [Gesichtspunkte], as it were, on the one thought." Thus Schopenhauer counsels reading the book more than once, with considerable patience the first time. Schopenhauer addresses the structure of the work in the following passage from Book IV, section 54:

Since, as we have said, this whole work is just the unfolding of a single thought, it follows that all its parts are bound together most intimately; each one does not just stand in a necessary connection to the one before, presupposing only that the reader has remembered it ... although we need to dissect our one and only thought into many discussions for the purpose of communication, this is an artificial form and in no way essential to the thought itself. Presentation and comprehension are both made easier by the separation of four principal perspectives into four Books, connecting what is related and homogeneous with the utmost of care. Nonetheless, the material does not by any means allow for a linear progression, as is the case with history, but rather requires a more intricate presentation. Thus it is necessary to study the book repeatedly, since this alone will clarify the connection of each part to the other; only then will they all reciprocally illuminate each other and become perfectly clear.

His belated fame after 1851 stimulated renewed interest in his seminal work, and led to a third and final edition with 136 more pages in 1859, one year before his death. In the preface to the latter, Schopenhauer noted: "If I also have at last arrived, and have the satisfaction at the end of my life of seeing the beginning of my influence, it is with the hope that, according to an old rule, it will last longer in proportion to the lateness of its beginning."

== Volume 1 ==
Schopenhauer used the word will as a human's most familiar designation for the concept that can also be signified by other words such as desire, striving, wanting, effort and urging. Schopenhauer's philosophy holds that all nature, including man, is the expression of an insatiable will. It is through the will, the in-itself of all existence, that humans find all their suffering. Desire for more is what causes this suffering. He argues that only aesthetic pleasure creates momentary escape from the will. Schopenhauer's concept of desire has strong parallels in Buddhist thought. Buddhism identifies the individual's pervasive sense of dissatisfaction as driving craving, roughly similar to what Schopenhauer would call the will to life. Both assert that remedies for this condition include contemplative, ascetic activities.

The epigraph to volume one is a quotation from Johann Wolfgang von Goethe: Ob nicht Natur zuletzt sich doch ergründe? ('Might not nature finally fathom itself?'). The quotation comes from a poem to Staatsminister von Voigt, 27 September 1816.

=== Epistemology (Book I) ===
The opening sentence of Schopenhauer's work is Die Welt ist meine Vorstellung: "the world is my representation" (alternatively, "idea" or "presentation"). In the first book, Schopenhauer considers the world as representation. Specifically, the first book deals with representation subject to the principle of sufficient reason (German: Satz vom Grunde). In Book III, Schopenhauer returns to considering the world as representation; this time, he focuses on representation independent of the principle of sufficient reason (i.e. the Platonic Idea, the immediate and adequate objecthood of the will, which is the object of art).

Schopenhauer begins WWR by examining the world as it shows itself to us in our minds: objects ordered necessarily by space and time and by cause-and-effect relationships. In our experience, the world is ordered according to the principle of sufficient reason. We perceive a multiplicity of objects related to one another in necessary ways.

=== Ontology (Book II) ===
In Book II, Schopenhauer argues that will is the Kantian thing-in-itself: the single essence underlying all objects and phenomena. Kant believed that space and time were merely the forms of our intuition by which we must perceive the world of phenomena, and these factors were absent from the thing-in-itself. Schopenhauer pointed out that anything outside of time and space could not be differentiated, so the thing-in-itself must be one. All things that exist, including human beings, must be part of this fundamental unity. The manifestation of the single will into the multiplicity of objects we experience is the will's objectivation. Plurality exists and has become possible only through time and space, which is why Schopenhauer refers to them as the principium individuationis. The will, as thing-in-itself, lies outside of the principle of sufficient reason (in all its forms) and is thus groundless (though each of the will's phenomena is subject to that principle). The will, lying outside the principium individuationis, is free from all plurality (though its phenomena, existing in space and time, are innumerable).

All phenomena embody essential striving: electricity and gravity, for instance, are described as fundamental forces of the will. Human capacity for cognition, Schopenhauer asserts, is subordinate to the demands of the will. Moreover, everything that wills necessarily suffers. Schopenhauer presents a pessimistic picture on which unfulfilled desires are painful, and pleasure is merely the sensation experienced at the instant one such pain is removed. However, most desires are never fulfilled, and those that are fulfilled are instantly replaced by more unfulfilled ones.

=== Aesthetics (Book III) ===
If the whole world as representation is only the visibility of the will, then art is the elucidation of this visibility, the camera obscura which shows the objects more purely, and enables us to survey and comprehend them better. It is the play within the play, the stage on the stage in Hamlet.

— Schopenhauer, The World as Will and Representation, Vol. 1, Book III, §52

In Book III, Schopenhauer explores the experience of aesthetic contemplation. When we contemplate something aesthetically, we have knowledge of the object not as an individual thing but rather as a universal Platonic Idea (die Platonische Idee). The individual is then able to lose himself in the object of aesthetic contemplation and, for a brief moment, escape the cycle of unfulfilled desire as a "pure, will-less subject of knowledge" (reinen, willenlosen Subjekts der Erkenntniß). This entails the abandonment of the method of cognition bound to the principle of sufficient reason (the only mode appropriate to the service of the will and science). During the aesthetic experience, we gain momentary relief from the pain that accompanies our striving. Like many other aesthetic theories, Schopenhauer's centers on the concept of genius. Genius, according to Schopenhauer, is possessed by all people in varying degrees and consists of the capacity for aesthetic experience. Those who have a high degree of genius can be taught to communicate these aesthetic experiences to others, and objects that communicate these experiences are works of art.

We consider objects to be beautiful that best facilitate contemplation that is purely objective by a will-less consciousness and express 'elevated' Ideas (such as those of humanity). Schopenhauer compares the experience of something as beautiful to the experience of something as sublime (das Erhabene)—in the latter case, we struggle over our natural hostility to the object of contemplation and are elevated above it. An aesthetic experience does not arise from the object stimulating our will; hence Schopenhauer criticized depictions of nude women and appetizing food, as these stimulate desire and thus hinder the viewer from becoming "the pure, will-less subject of knowledge."

The rest of the Third Book contains an account of a variety of art forms, including architecture, landscape gardening, landscape painting, animal painting, historical painting, sculpture, the nude, literature (poetry and tragedy), and lastly, music. Music occupies a privileged place in Schopenhauer's aesthetics, as he believed it to have a special relationship to the will. Other artworks objectify the will only indirectly by means of the Ideas (the adequate objectification of the will), and our world is nothing but the appearance of the Ideas in multiplicity resulting from those Ideas entering into the principium individuationis. Music, Schopenhauer asserts, passes over the Ideas and is therefore independent of the phenomenal world. He writes:

Thus music is as immediate an objectification and copy of the whole will as the world itself is, indeed as the Ideas are, the multiplied phenomenon of which constitutes the world of individual things. Therefore music is by no means like the other arts, namely a copy of the Ideas, but a copy of the will itself, the objectivity of which are the Ideas. For this reason the effect of music is so very much more powerful and penetrating than is that of the other arts, for these others speak only of the shadow, but music of the essence.

=== Ethics (Book IV) ===
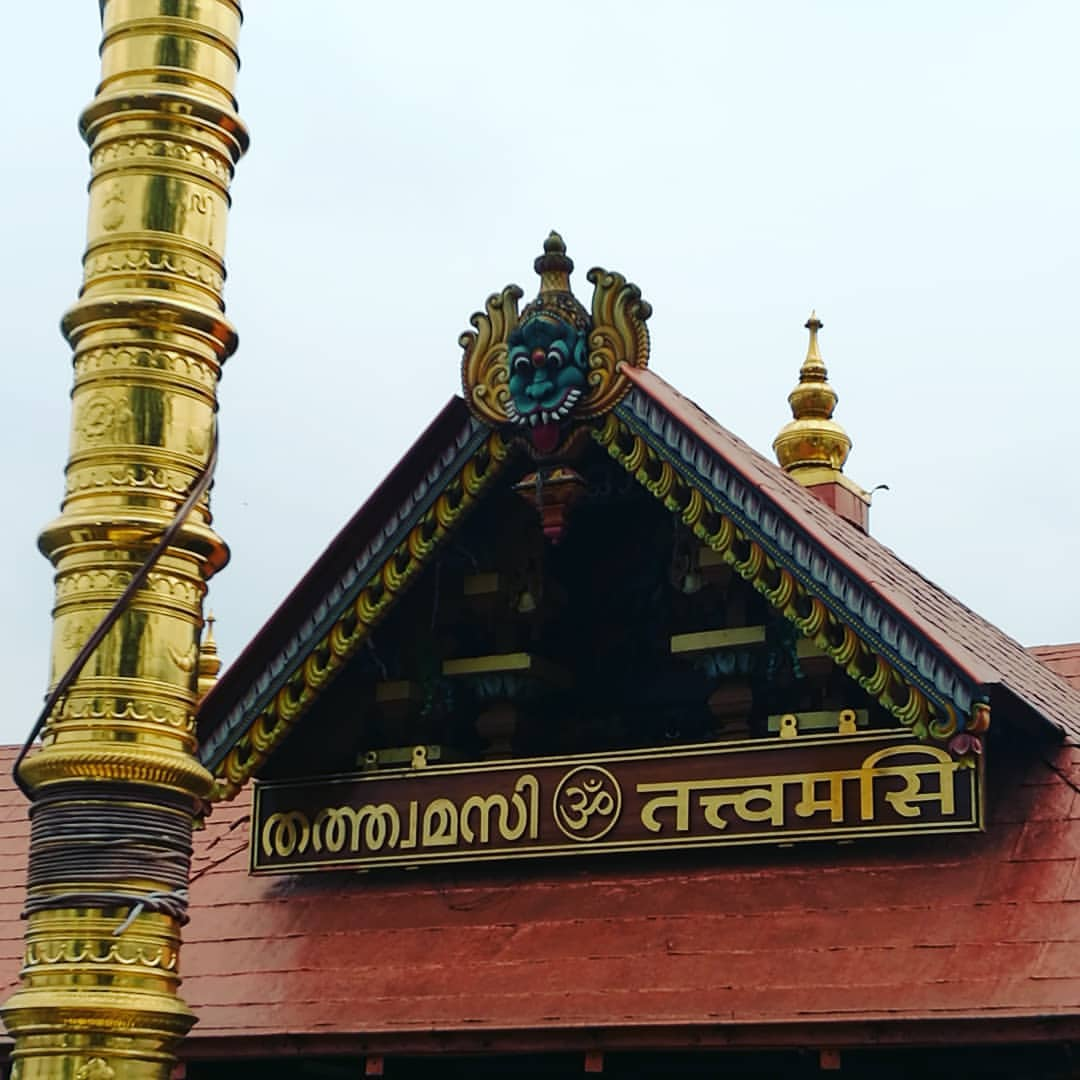
The phrase "Tat Tvam Asi" ('thou art that'), one of the Mahāvākyas of the Upanishads, displayed on an Indian temple. Schopenhauer uses this Sanskrit phrase to express a foundational tenet of his ethics: 'the will is the in-itself of every appearance, and as such is itself free from the form of appearance, and thus from all multiplicity' (Book IV, §66).

In Book IV, Schopenhauer returns to considering the world as will. He claims in this book to set forth a purely descriptive account of human ethical behavior, in which he identifies two types of behavior: the affirmation and denial of the 'will to life' (Wille zum Leben), which constitutes the essence of every individual. Schopenhauer subsequently elucidated his ethical philosophy in his two prize essays: On the Freedom of the Will (1839) and On the Basis of Morality (1840).

According to Schopenhauer, the will conflicts with itself through the egoism that every human and animal is endowed with. Compassion arises from a transcendence of this egoism (the penetration of the illusory perception of individuality, so that one can empathise with the suffering of another) and can serve as a clue to the possibility of going beyond desire and the will. Schopenhauer categorically denies the existence of the "freedom of the will" in the conventional sense, and only adumbrates how the will can be affirmed or negated, but is not subject to change, and serves as the root of the chain of causal determinism.

Schopenhauer discusses suicide at length, noting that it does not actually destroy the Will or any part of it in any substantial way, since death is merely the end of one particular phenomenon of the Will, which is subsequently rearranged. By asceticism, the ultimate denial of the will as practiced by eastern monastics and by saints, one can slowly weaken the individual will in a way that is far more significant than violent suicide, which is, in fact, in some sense an affirmation of the will.

Schopenhauer's praise for asceticism led him to think highly of Buddhism and Vedanta Hinduism, as well as some monastic orders and ascetic practices found in Catholicism. He expressed contempt for Protestantism, Judaism, and Islam, which he saw as optimistic, devoid of metaphysics and cruel to non-human animals. According to Schopenhauer, the deep truth of the matter is that in cases of the over-affirmation of the will—that is, cases where one individual exerts his will not only for its own fulfillment but for the improper domination of others—he is unaware that he is really identical with the person he is harming, so that the Will in fact constantly harms itself, and justice is done in the moment in which the crime is committed, since the same metaphysical individual is both the perpetrator and the victim.

According to Schopenhauer, denial of the will to live is the way to salvation from suffering. Salvation can only result from the recognition that individuality is nothing more than an illusion—the world in itself cannot be divided into individuals—which 'tranquilizes' the will. The human who comprehends this would 'negate' his will and thus be freed from the pains of existence that result from the will's ceaseless striving. "Schopenhauer tells us that when the will is denied, the sage becomes nothing, without actually dying." When willing disappears, both the willer and the world become nothing. "...[T]o one who has achieved the will-less state, it is the world of the willer that has been disclosed as 'nothing'. Its hold over us, its seeming reality, has been 'abolished' so that it now stands before us as nothing but a bad dream from which we are, thankfully, awaking." Schopenhauer concludes the Fourth Book with the following statement: "...to those in whom the will has turned and denied itself, this very real world of ours, with all its Suns and Milky Ways, is—nothing." In a footnote, Schopenhauer associates this 'nothing' with the Prajñāpāramitā of Buddhism: the point where subject and object no longer exist.

=== Criticism of the Kantian Philosophy (Appendix) ===
At the end of Book 4, Schopenhauer appended a thorough discussion of the merits and faults of Kant's philosophy. Schopenhauer's Kritik der Kantischen Philosophie opens with the following quote from Voltaire from The Age of Louis XIV: "C'est le privilège du vrai génie, et surtout du génie qui ouvre une carrière, de faire impunément de grandes fautes ('It is the privilege of true genius, and above all the genius who opens a new path, to make great errors with impunity.') Schopenhauer asserts that Kant's greatest merit was the distinction between appearance [Erscheinung] and the thing-in-itself [Ding an sich], proving that the intellect always stands between us and things, and thus we cannot have knowledge of things as they may be in themselves. Among Kant's defects, Schopenhauer argues, is the untenable manner in which Kant chose to introduce the thing-in-itself in his Critique of Pure Reason. Schopenhauer also argued that Kant failed to distinguish between intuitive and abstract cognition—that is, intuitive representations from concepts thought merely in the abstract—which gave rise to grave confusions and errors. Criticizing Kant's preference for arranging his philosophical system according to an elegant architectonic symmetry, Schopenhauer at one point describes Kant's twelve categories as a "terrible Procrustean bed into which he violently forces everything in the world and everything that happens in humans."

== Volume 2 ==
The second volume consisted of several essays expanding topics covered in the first. Most important are his reflections on death and his theory on sexuality, which saw it as a manifestation of the whole will making sure that it will live on and depriving humans of their reason and sanity in their longing for their loved ones. Less successful is his theory of genetics: he argued that humans inherit their will, and thus their character, from their fathers, but their intellect from their mothers and he provides examples from biographies of great figures to illustrate this theory. The second volume also contains attacks on contemporary philosophers such as Fichte, Schelling, and Hegel.

The contents of Volume II are as follows.

=== Supplements to the First Book ===
First Half: The Doctrine of the Representation of Perception (through § 1 – 7 of Volume I)

- On the Fundamental View of Idealism
- On the Doctrine of Knowledge of Perception or Knowledge of the Understanding
- On the Senses
- On Knowledge a Priori

Second Half: The Doctrine of the Abstract Representation or of Thinking

- On the Intellect Devoid of Reason
- On the Doctrine of Abstract Knowledge, or Knowledge of Reason
- On the Relation of Knowledge of Perception to Abstract Knowledge
- On the Theory of the Ludicrous
- On Logic in General
- On the Science of Syllogisms
- On Rhetoric
- On the Doctrine of Science
- On the Methods of Mathematics
- On the Association of Ideas
- On the Essential Imperfections of the Intellect
- On the Practical Use of Our Reason and on Stoicism
- On Man's Need for Metaphysics

=== Supplements to the Second Book ===
- On the Possibility of Knowing the Thing-in-Itself
- On the Primacy of the Will in Self-Consciousness
- On Objectification of the Will in the Animal Organism
- On Retrospect and More General Consideration
- On Objective View of the Intellect
- On the objectification of the Will in Nature without Knowledge
- On Matter
- On Transcendent Considerations on the Will as Thing-in-Itself
- On Teleology
- On Instinct and Mechanical Tendency
- On Characterization of the Will-to-Live

=== Supplements to the Third Book ===
- On Knowledge of the Ideas
- On the Pure Subject of Knowing
- On Genius
- On Madness
- On Isolated Remarks on Natural Beauty
- On the Inner Nature of Art
- On the Aesthetics of Architecture
- On Isolated Remarks on the Aesthetics of the Plastic and Pictorial Arts
- On the Aesthetics of Poetry
- On History
- On the Metaphysics of Music

=== Supplements to the Fourth Book ===
- On Preface
- On Death and Its Relation to the Indestructibility of Our Inner nature
- On Life of the Species
- On the Hereditary Nature of Qualities
- On the Metaphysics of Sexual Love [+ Appendix]
- On the Affirmation of the Will-to-Live
- On the Vanity and Suffering of Life
- On Ethics
- On the Doctrine of the Denial of the Will-to-Live
- On the Road to Salvation
- On Epiphilosophy

== Influence ==
The first decades after its publication The World as Will and Representation was met with near silence. Exceptions were Goethe and Jean Paul. Goethe immediately started to read the magnum opus of Schopenhauer when it arrived and "read it with an eagerness as she [ Ottilie von Goethe ] had never before seen in him". Goethe told his daughter-in-law that he had now pleasure for an entire year, because he would read it completely, contrary to his custom of sampling pages to his liking. The influence of Schopenhauer can be read in Gespräche mit Goethe and Urworte. Orphisch.

In the years where the work was largely ignored, Jean Paul praised it as "a work of philosophical genius, bold, universal, full of penetration and profoundness—but of a depth often hopeless and bottomless, akin to that melancholy lake in Norway, in whose deep water, beneath the steep rock-walls, one never sees the sun, but only stars reflected", on which Schopenhauer commented: "In my opinion the praise of one man of genius fully makes good the neglect of a thoughtless multitude".

This neglect came to an end in the last years of his life. Schopenhauer would become the most influential philosopher in Germany until World War I. Especially artists were attracted to the work. No philosopher had given so much importance to art: one fourth of The World as Will and Representation is concerned with aesthetics. To be mentioned are Wagner (Influence of Schopenhauer on Tristan und Isolde), Schoenberg, Mahler, who cites The World as Will and Representation as "the most profound writing on music he had ever encountered", Thomas Mann, Hermann Hesse, Jorge Luis Borges, Tolstoy, D. H. Lawrence and Samuel Beckett.

The philosophers Friedrich Nietzsche and Philipp Mainländer both described the discovery of The World as Will and Representation as a revelation. Nietzsche commented, "I belong to those readers of Schopenhauer who know perfectly well, after they have turned the first page, that they will read all the others, and listen to every word that he has spoken".

Charles Darwin quoted The World as Will and Representation in The Descent of Man. Some read ideas in it that can be found in the theory of evolution, for example, that sexual instinct is a tool of nature to ensure the quality of the offspring. Schopenhauer argued in favor of transformism by pointing to one of the most important and familiar evidences of the truth of the theory of descent, the homologies in the inner structure of all the vertebrates.

Schopenhauer's discussions of language and ethics were a major influence on Ludwig Wittgenstein, who had read The World as Will and Representation at age 16.

Schopenhauer's views on the independence of spatially separated systems, the principium individuationis, influenced Einstein, who called him a genius. Schrödinger put the Schopenhauerian label on a folder of papers in his files "Collection of Thoughts on the physical Principium individuationis".
