= Critique of the Kantian Philosophy =

1818 philosophical work by Arthur Schopenhauer

Critique of the Kantian Philosophy (German: "Kritik der Kantischen Philosophie") is a 143-page essay which Arthur Schopenhauer appended to the first volume of his The World as Will and Representation (1818). He wanted to show Immanuel Kant's errors so that Kant's merits would be appreciated and his achievements furthered.

At the time he wrote his criticism, Schopenhauer was acquainted only with the second (1787) edition of Kant's Critique of Pure Reason. When he later read the first (1781) edition, he said that many of the contradictions he had identified in the second edition had been absent from the first edition.

== Kant's merits ==
According to Schopenhauer's essay, Kant's three main merits are as follows:

1. The distinction of the phenomenon from the thing-in-itself (Ding an sich)
  - The intellect mediates between things and knowledge
  - Locke's primary qualities result from the mind's activity, just as his secondary qualities result from receptivity at any of the five senses
  - A priori knowledge is separate from a posteriori knowledge
  - The ideal and the real are diverse from each other
  - Transcendental philosophy goes beyond dogmatic philosophy's "eternal truths", such as the principle of contradiction and the principle of sufficient reason. It shows that those "truths" are based on necessary forms of thought that exist in the mind.
2. The explanation of how the moral significance of human conduct is different from the laws that are concerned with phenomena
  - The significance is directly related to the thing-in-itself, the innermost nature of the world
3. Religious scholastic philosophy is completely overthrown by the demonstration of the impossibility of proofs for speculative theology and also for rational psychology, or reasoned study of the soul

Schopenhauer also said that Kant's discussion, on pages A534 to A550, of the contrast between empirical and intelligible characters is one of Kant's most profound ideas. Schopenhauer asserted that it is among the most admirable things ever said by a human.

- The empirical character of a phenomenon is completely determined
- The intelligible character of a phenomenon is free. It is the thing-in-itself which is experienced as a phenomenon.

== Kant's faults ==
=== Fundamental error ===
==== Perceptions and concepts ====
Kant wanted to make the table of judgments the key to all knowledge. In so doing, he was concerned with making a system and did not think of defining terms such as perception and conception, as well as reason, understanding, subject, object, and others.

Fundamental error: Kant did not distinguish between the concrete, intuitive, perceptual knowledge of objects and the abstract, discursive, conceptual, knowledge of thoughts.

- Kant began his investigation into knowledge of perceived objects by considering indirect, reflective knowledge of concepts instead of direct, intuitive knowledge of perceptions.
- For Kant, there is absolutely no knowledge of an object unless there is thought which employs abstract concepts. For him, perception is not knowledge because it is not thought. In general, Kant claimed that perception is mere sensation.
  - In accordance with Kant's claim, non-human animals would not be able to know objects. Animals would only know impressions on their sense organs, which Kant mistakenly called perception. Kant had erroneously asserted that full, perceived objects, not mere sensations, were given to the mind by the sense organs. Perception, however, according to Schopenhauer, is intellectual and is a product of the Understanding. Perception of an object does not result from the mere data of the senses. It requires the Understanding. Therefore, if animals do not have Understanding, in accordance with Kant, then they have only Sensation, which, Schopenhauer claimed, gives only raw sense data, not perceived objects.
- Schopenhauer considered the following sentences on page A253 of the Critique of Pure Reason to encapsulate all of Kant's errors:
  - If all thought (by means of categories) is taken away from empirical knowledge, no knowledge of any object remains, because nothing can be thought by mere intuition or perception. The simple fact that there is within me an affection of my sensibility, establishes in no way any relation of such a representation to any object.
  - On page A253, Kant stated that no knowledge of any object would remain if all thought by means of categories were removed from empirical knowledge.
    - Schopenhauer claimed that perception occurs without conceptual thought.
  - On page A253, Kant stated that a concept without an intuition is not empty. It still has the form of thought.
    - Schopenhauer claimed that perceived representations are the content of a concept. Without them, the concept is empty.

=== Secondary errors ===
==== Transcendental analytic ====
- Kant asserted that metaphysics is knowledge a priori, or before experience. As a result, he concluded that the source of metaphysics cannot be inner or outer experience.
  - Schopenhauer claimed that metaphysics must understand inner and outer experience in order to know the world and not empty forms. Kant did not prove that the material for knowing the world is outside of the experience of the world and merely in the forms of knowledge.
- Kant's writing was obscure.
- Kant took the Greek word noumena, which meant "that which is thought," and used it to mean "things-in-themselves." (See Sextus Empiricus, Outlines of Pyrrhonism, Book I, Chapter 13: "Anaxagoras opposed what is thought (noumena) to what appears or is perceived (phenomena).")
- Kant tried to create a logical, overly-symmetrical system without reflecting on its contents.
  - He didn't clearly explain the meaning of and relationships between represented objects, representing subjects, existence, truth, illusion, error, sensations, judgments, words, concepts, perceptions, understanding, and reason.

===== Concepts =====
- Kant didn't clearly explain concepts in general:
  - Concepts of the understanding (common concepts and categories).
  - Concepts of Reason (Ideas of God, Freedom, and Immortality).
- He divided reason into theoretical and practical, making practical reason the source of virtuous conduct.

===== Idealism =====
- Kant altered his first edition to:
  - suppress the idealistic assertion that objects are conditioned by the knowing subject;

===== Object-in-itself and thing-in-itself =====
According to Schopenhauer, there is a difference between an object-in-itself and a thing-in-itself. There is no object-in-itself. An object is always an object for a subject. An object is really a representation of an object. On the other hand, a thing-in-itself, for Kant, is completely unknown. It cannot be spoken of at all without employing categories (pure concepts of the understanding). A thing-in-itself is that which appears to an observer when the observer experiences a representation.

- Kant altered his first edition to:
  - claim that the spatially external thing-in-itself causes sensations in the sense organs of the knowing subject.
- Kant tried to explain how:
  - a perceived object, not mere raw sensation, is given to the mind by sensibility (sensation, space, and time), and
  - how the human understanding produces an experienced object by thinking twelve categories.
- Kant doesn't explain how something external causes sensation in a sense organ.
- He didn't explain whether the object of experience (the object of knowledge which is the result of the application of the categories) is a perceptual representation or an abstract concept. He mixed up the perceptible and the abstract so that an absurd hybrid of the two resulted.
  - There is a contradiction between the object experienced by the senses and the object experienced by the understanding.
    - Kant claims that representation of an object occurs both
      - through reception of one or more of the five senses, and
      - through the activity of the understanding's twelve categories.
    - Sensation and understanding are separate and distinct abilities. Yet, for Kant, an object is known through each of them.
    - This contradiction is the source of the obscurity of the Transcendental Logic.
  - Kant's incorrect triple distinction:
    - Representation (given to one or more of the 5 senses, and to the sensibilities of space and time)
    - Object that is represented (thought through the 12 categories)
    - Thing-in-itself (cannot be known).
  - Schopenhauer claimed that Kant's represented object is false. The true distinction is only between the representation and the thing-in-itself.
  - For Schopenhauer, the law of causality, which relates only to the representation and not to the thing-in-itself, is the real and only form of the understanding. The other 11 categories are therefore unnecessary because there is no represented object to be thought through them.
  - Kant sometimes spoke of the thing-in-itself as though it was an object that caused changes in a subject's senses. Schopenhauer affirmed that the thing-in-itself was totally different from phenomena and therefore had nothing to do with causality or being an object for a subject.
- Excessive fondness for symmetry:
  - Origin of Kant's Transcendental Logic:
    - As pure intuitions (in the Transcendental Aesthetic) were the basis of empirical intuitions,
    - pure concepts (in the Transcendental Logic) were made the basis of empirical concepts.
    - As the Transcendental Aesthetic was the a priori basis of mathematics,
    - the Transcendental Logic was made the a priori basis of logic.
- After discovering empirical perception is based on two forms of a priori perception (space and time), Kant tried to demonstrate that empirical knowledge is based on an analogous a priori knowledge (categories).

===== Schemata =====
- He went too far when he claimed that the schemata of the pure concepts of the understanding (the categories) are analogous to a schema of empirically acquired concepts.
  - A schema of empirical perception is a sketchy, imagined perception. Thus, a schema is the mere imagined form or outline, so to speak, of a real perception. It is related to an empirical abstract concept to show that the concept is not mere word-play but has indeed been based on real perceptions. These perceptions are the actual, material content of the empirical abstract concept.
  - A schema of pure concepts is supposed to be a pure perception. There is supposed to be a schema for each of the pure concepts (categories). Kant overlooked the fact that these pure concepts, being pure, have no perceptual content. They gain this content from empirical perception. Kant's schemata of pure concepts are entirely undemonstrable and are a merely arbitrary assumption.
  - This demonstrates Kant's purposeful intention to find a pure, a priori analogical basis for every empirical, a posteriori mental activity.

===== Judgments/categories =====
- Derived all philosophical knowledge from the table of judgments.
- Made the table of categories the basis for every assertion about the physical and the metaphysical.
  - Derived pure concepts of the understanding (categories) from reason. But the Transcendental Analytic was supposed to reference only the sensibility of the sense organs and also the mind's way of understanding objects. It was not supposed to be concerned with reason.
    - Categories of quantity were based on judgments of quantity. But these judgments relate to reason, not understanding. They involve logical inclusion or exclusion of concepts with each other, as follows:
      - Universal judgment: All A are x; Particular judgment: Some A are x; Singular judgment: This one A is x.
      - Note: The word "quantity" was poorly chosen to designate mutual relations between abstract concepts.
    - Categories of quality were based on judgments of quality. But these judgments also are related only to reason, not to understanding. Affirmation and denial are relations between concepts in a verbal judgment. They have nothing to do with perceptual reality for the understanding. Kant also included infinite judgments, but only for the sake of architectonic symmetry. They have no meaning in Kant's context.
      - The term "quality" was chosen because it has usually been opposed to "quantity." But here it means only affirmation and denial in a judgment.
  - The categorical relation (A is x) is simply the general connection of a subject concept with a predicate concept in a statement. It includes the hypothetical and disjunctive sub-relations. It also includes the judgments of quality (affirmation, negation) and judgments of quantity (inclusional relationships between concepts). Kant made separate categories from these sub-relations. He used indirect, abstract knowledge to analyze direct, perceptual knowledge.
    - Our certain knowledge of the physical persistence of substance, or the conservation of matter, is derived, by Kant, from the category of subsistence and inherence. But this is merely based on the connection of a linguistic subject with its predicate.
  - With judgments of relation, the hypothetical judgment (if A, then B) does not correspond only to the law of causality. This judgment is also associated with three other roots of the principle of sufficient reason. Abstract reasoning does not disclose the distinction between these four kinds of ground. Knowledge from perception is required.
    - reason of knowing (logical inference);
    - reason of acting (law of motivation);
    - reason of being (spatial and temporal relations, including the arithmetical sequences of numbers and the geometrical positions of points, lines, and surfaces).
  - Disjunctive judgments derive from the logical law of thought of the excluded middle (A is either A or not-A). This relates to reason, not to the understanding. For the purpose of symmetry, Kant asserted that the physical analog of this logical law was the category of community or reciprocal effect. However, it is the opposite, since the logical law refers to mutually exclusive predicates, not inclusive.
    - Schopenhauer asserted that there is no reciprocal effect. It is only a superfluous synonym for causality. For architectonic symmetry, Kant created a separate a priori function in the understanding for reciprocal effect. Actually, there is only an alternating succession of states, a chain of causes and effects.
  - Modal categories of possible, actual, and necessary are not special, original cognized forms. They are derived from the principle of sufficient reason (ground).
    - Possibility is a general, mental abstraction. It refers to abstract concepts, which are solely related to the ability to reason or logically infer.
    - There is no difference between actuality (existence) and necessity.
    - Necessity is a consequence from a given ground (reason).

==== Transcendental dialectic ====
===== Reason =====
- Kant defined reason as the faculty or power of principles. He claimed that principles provide us with synthetical knowledge from mere concepts (A 301; B 358). However, knowledge from mere concepts, without perception, is analytical, not synthetical. Synthetical knowledge requires the combination of two concepts, plus a third thing. This third thing is pure intuition or perception, if it is a priori, and empirical perception, if it is a posteriori.
- According to Kant's principle of reason, everything that is conditioned is part of a total series of conditions. The essential nature of reason tries to find something unconditioned that functions as a beginning of the series.
  - But Schopenhauer claimed that the demand is only for a sufficient reason or ground. It extends merely to the completeness of the determinations of the nearest or next cause, not to an absolute first cause.
- Kant claimed that everyone's reason leads them to assume three unconditioned absolutes. These are God, the soul, and the total world. The unconditioned absolutes are symmetrically derived by Kant from three kinds of syllogism as the result of three categories of relation.
  - Schopenhauer stated that the soul and the total world are not unconditioned because they are supposed, by believers, to be conditioned by God.
  - Schopenhauer also stated that everyone's reason does not lead to these three unconditioned absolutes. Buddhists are nontheists. Only Judaism and its derivatives, Christianity and Islam, are monotheistic. Exhaustive and extensive historical research would be needed to validate Kant's claim about the universality of reason's three unconditioned absolutes.

===== Ideas of reason =====
- Kant called God, soul, and total world (cosmos) Ideas of Reason. In doing so, he appropriated Plato's word "Idea" and ambiguously changed its settled meaning. Plato's Ideas are models or standards from which copies are generated. The copies are visible objects of perception. Kant's Ideas of Reason are not accessible to knowledge of perception. They are barely understandable through abstract knowledge of concepts.
- Fondness for symmetry led Kant to derive, as necessary, the concept of the soul from the paralogisms of rational psychology. He did so by applying the demand for the unconditional to the concept of substance, which is the first category of relation.
- Kant claimed that the concept of the soul arose from the concept of the final, unconditioned subject of all predicates of a thing. This was taken from the logical form of the categorical syllogism.
  - Schopenhauer asserted that subjects and predicates are logical. They are concerned only with the relation of abstract concepts in a judgment. They are not concerned with a substance, such as a soul, that contains no material basis.
- The Idea of the total world, cosmos, or universe was said, by Kant, to originate from the hypothetical syllogism (If A is x, then B is y; A is x; Therefore, B is y).
  - Schopenhauer said that all three Ideas (God, soul, and universe) might be derived from the hypothetical syllogism. This is because all of these Ideas are concerned with the dependence of one object on another. When no more dependencies can be imagined, then the unconditioned has been reached.
- Relating the Cosmological Ideas to the Table of Categories
  - Kant stated that the cosmological Ideas, with regard to the limits of the world in time and space, are determined through the category of quantity.
    - Schopenhauer asserted that those Ideas are not related to that category. Quantity is only concerned with the mutual inclusion of exclusion of concepts with each other (All A are x; Some A are x; This A is x).
  - Kant said that the divisibility of matter occurred according to the category of quality. But quality is merely the affirmation or negation in a judgment. Schopenhauer wrote that the mechanical divisibility of matter is associated with the quantity of matter, not quality.
    - All of the cosmological ideas should derive from the hypothetical form of syllogism and therefore from the principle of sufficient reason. Kant asserted that divisibility of a whole into ultimate parts was based on the principle of sufficient reason. This is because the ultimate parts are supposed to be the ground conditions and the whole is supposed to be the consequent. However, Schopenhauer claimed that divisibility is instead based on the principle of contradiction. For him, the parts and the whole are actually one. If the ultimate parts are thought away, then the whole is also thought away.
  - According to Schopenhauer, the fourth antinomy is redundant. It is an unnecessary repetition of the third antinomy. This arrangement was formed for the purpose of maintaining the architectonic symmetry of the category table.
    - The thesis of the third antinomy asserts the existence of the causality of freedom. This is the same as the primary cause of the world.
    - The thesis of the fourth antinomy asserts the existence of an absolutely necessary Being that is the cause of the world. Kant associated this with modality because through the first cause, the contingent becomes necessary.
- Schopenhauer calls the whole antinomy of cosmology a mere sham fight. He said that Kant only pretended that there is a necessary antinomy in reason.
  - In all four antinomies, the proof of the thesis is a sophism.
  - The proof of each antithesis, however, is an inevitable conclusion from premisses that are derived from the absolutely certain laws of the phenomenal world.
- The theses are sophisms, according to Schopenhauer.
  - First Cosmological Antinomy's Thesis:
    - Purports to discuss beginning of time but instead discusses end or completion of series of times.
    - Arbitrarily presupposes that the world is given as a whole and is therefore limited.
  - Second Cosmological Antinomy's Thesis:
    - Begs the question by presupposing that a compound is an accumulation of simple parts.
    - Arbitrarily assumes that all matter is compound instead of an infinitely divisible total.
  - Third Cosmological Antinomy's Thesis:
    - Kant appeals to his principle of pure reason (reason seeks the unconditioned in a series) in order to support causality through freedom. But, according to Schopenhauer, reason seeks the latest, most recent, sufficient cause. It does not seek the most remote first cause.
    - Kant said that the practical concept of freedom is based on the transcendent Idea of freedom, which is an unconditioned cause. Schopenhauer argued that the recognition of freedom comes from the consciousness that the inner essence or thing-in-itself is free will.
  - Fourth Cosmological Antinomy's Thesis:
    - The fourth antinomy is a redundant repetition of the third antinomy. Every conditioned does not presuppose a complete series of conditions which ends with the unconditioned. Instead, every conditioned presupposes only its most recent condition.
- As a solution to the cosmological antinomy, Kant stated:
  - Both sides assumed that the world exists in itself. Therefore, both sides are wrong in the first and second antinomies.
  - Both sides assumed that reason assumes an unconditioned first cause of a series of conditions. Therefore, both sides are correct in the third and fourth antinomies.
  - Schopenhauer disagreed. He said that the solution was that the antitheses are correct in all four antinomies.
- Kant stated that the Transcendental Ideal is a necessary idea of human reason. It is the most real, perfect, powerful entity.
  - Schopenhauer disagreed. He said that his own reason found this idea to be impossible. He was unable to think of any definite object that corresponds to the description.
- The three main objects of scholastic philosophy were the soul, the world, and God. Kant tried to show how they were taken from the three possible major premisses of syllogisms.
  - The soul was derived from the categorical judgment (A is x) and the world was taken from the hypothetical judgment (If A is x, then B is y).
  - For architectonic symmetry, God had to be derived from the remaining disjunctive judgment (A is either x or not-x).
    - Schopenhauer said that the antique philosophers did not mention this derivation, so it can't be necessary to all human reason. Their gods were limited. World-creating gods merely gave form to pre-existing matter. Reason, according to ancient philosophers, did not obtain an idea of a perfect God or Ideal from the disjunctive syllogism.
    - Kant stated that knowledge of particular things results from a continuous process of the limitation of general or universal concepts. The most universal concept would then have contained all reality in itself.
      - According to Schopenhauer, the reverse is true. Knowledge starts from the particular and is extended to the general. General concepts result from abstraction from particulars, retaining only their common element. The most universal concept would thus have the least particular content and be the emptiest.
- Kant alleged that the three transcendent ideas are useful as regulative principles. As such, he claimed, they aid in the advancement of the knowledge of nature.
  - Schopenhauer asserted that Kant was diametrically wrong. The ideas of soul, finite world, and God are hindrances. For example, the search for a simple, immaterial, thinking soul would not be scientifically useful.

==== Ethics ====
- Kant claimed that virtue results from practical reason.
  - Schopenhauer claimed that, to the contrary, virtuous conduct has nothing to do with a rational life and may even be opposed to it, as with Machiavellian rational expediency.

===== Categorical Imperative =====
- According to Schopenhauer, Kant's Categorical Imperative:
  - Redundantly repeats the ancient command: "don't do to another what you don't want done to you."
  - Is egoistic because its universality includes the person who both gives and obeys the command.
  - Is cold and dead because it is to be followed without love, feeling, or inclination, but merely out of a sense of duty.

==== Power of judgment ====
- In the Critique of Pure Reason, Kant claimed that the understanding was the ability to judge. The forms of judgments were said to be the basis of the categories and all philosophy. But in his Critique of Judgment, he called a new, different ability the faculty of judgment. That now resulted in four faculties: sensation, understanding, judging, and reason. Judgment was located between understanding and reason, and contained elements of both.
- Kant's interest in the concept of suitability or expediency resulted in his investigation regarding knowledge of beauty and knowledge of natural purposiveness.

===== Aesthetics =====
- As usual, he started from abstract concepts in order to know concrete perceptions. Kant started from the abstract judgment of taste in order to investigate knowledge of beautiful objects of perception.
- Kant was not concerned with beauty itself. His interest was in the question of how a subjective statement or judgment about beauty could be universally valid, as though it concerned an actual quality of an object.

===== Teleology =====
- Kant asserted that the subjective statement that nature seems to have been created with a premeditated purpose does not necessarily have objective validity or truth.
- Kant claimed that the apparently purposive, deliberate constitution of organic bodies cannot be explained from merely mechanical causes. ("...it is absurd for man even to entertain any thought ... that maybe another Newton may some day arise to make intelligible to us even the genesis of but a blade of grass from natural laws that no design has ordered [i.e., from mechanical principles].") (Critique of Judgment, §75).
- Schopenhauer said that Kant didn't go far enough. Schopenhauer stated that one province of nature cannot be explained from laws of any other province of nature. He listed examples of separate provinces of nature as being mechanics, chemistry, electricity, magnetism, crystallization, and organics. Kant had only asserted this regarding the organic and the mechanical.

== Reactions to Schopenhauer ==
=== Paul Guyer ===
In The Cambridge Companion to Schopenhauer (1999), the philosopher Paul Guyer wrote an article titled "Schopenhauer, Kant, and the Methods of Philosophy." In it, he compared the methods of the two philosophers and in so doing, discussed Schopenhauer's criticism.

In explaining how objects are experienced, Kant used transcendental arguments. He tried to prove and explain the fundamental principles of knowledge. In so doing, he started by indirectly conceptually reflecting on the conditions that exist in the observing subject that make possible verbal judgments about objective experience.

We shall therefore follow up the pure concepts to their first germs and beginnings in the human understanding...

— A66

In contrast, Schopenhauer's method was to start by a direct examination of perceived objects in experience, not of abstract concepts.

...the solution of the riddle of the world is possible only through the proper connexion of outer with inner experience...

— Appendix p. 428

The fundamental principles of knowledge cannot be transcendentally explained or proved, they can only be immediately, directly known. Such principles are, for example, the permanence of substance, the law of causality, and the mutual interactive relationships between all objects in space. Abstract concepts, for Schopenhauer, are not the starting point of knowledge. They are derived from perceptions, which are the source of all knowledge of the objective world. The world is experienced in two ways: (1.) mental representations that involve space, time, and causality; (2.) our will which is known to control our body.

Guyer stated that Schopenhauer raised important questions regarding the possibility of Kant's transcendental arguments and proofs. However, even though Schopenhauer objected to Kant's method, he accepted many of Kant's conclusions. For example, Kant's description of experience and its relation to space, time, and causality was accepted. Also, the distinction between logical and real relations, as well as the difference between phenomena and things-in-themselves, played an important role in Schopenhauer's philosophy.

In general, the article tries to show how Schopenhauer misunderstood Kant as a result of the disparity between their methods. Where Kant was analyzing the conceptual conditions that resulted in the making of verbal judgments, Schopenhauer was phenomenologically scrutinizing intuitive experience. In one case, though, it is claimed that Schopenhauer raised a very important criticism: his objection to Kant's assertion that a particular event can be known as being successive only if its particular cause is known. Otherwise, almost all of Schopenhauer's criticisms are attributed to his opposite way of philosophizing which starts with the examination of perceptions instead of concepts.

=== Derek Parfit ===
In philosopher Derek Parfit's 2011 book On What Matters, Volume 1, Parfit presents an argument against psychological egoism that centers around an apparent equivocation between different senses of the word "want":

The word desire often refers to our sensual desires or appetites, or to our being attracted to something, by finding the thought of it appealing. I shall use desire in a wider sense, which refers to any state of being motivated, or of wanting something to happen and being to some degree disposed to make it happen, if we can. The word want already has both these senses.

Some people think: Whenever people act voluntarily, they are doing what they want to do. Doing what we want is selfish. So everyone always acts selfishly. This argument for Psychological Egoism fails, because it uses the word want first in the wide sense and then in the narrow sense. If I voluntarily gave up my life to save the lives of several strangers, my act would not be selfish, though I would be doing what in the wide sense I wanted to do.

=== Michael Kelly ===
Michael Kelly, in the preface to his 1910 book Kant's Ethics and Schopenhauer's Criticism, stated: "Of Kant it may be said that what is good and true in his philosophy would have been buried with him, were it not for Schopenhauer...."

=== Immanuel Kant ===
Immanuel Kant himself predicted a response to Schopenhauer's argument that he redundantly repeated the ancient command: "don't do to another what you don't want done to you", that is, the Golden Rule, and famously criticized it for not being sensitive to differences of situation, noting that a prisoner duly convicted of a crime could appeal to the golden rule while asking the judge to release him, pointing out that the judge would not want anyone else to send him to prison, so he should not do so to others. Kant's Categorical Imperative, introduced in Groundwork of the Metaphysic of Morals, is often confused with the Golden Rule. Also, it is exactly for being cold and dead because it is to be followed without love, feeling, or inclination, but merely out of a sense of duty, both in the theory and in its practice, that the Categorical Imperative is absolute, metaphysical and moral.

== See also ==
- Schema (Kant)
- Critique of the Schopehauerian philosophy
