= Thing-in-itself =

Status of objects as they are, independent of observation

In Kantian philosophy, the thing-in-itself (German: Ding an sich) is the status of objects as they are, independent of representation and observation. The concept of the thing-in-itself was introduced by the German philosopher Immanuel Kant, and over the following centuries was met with controversy among later philosophers. It is closely related to Kant's concept of noumena or the objects of inquiry, as opposed to phenomena, its manifestations.

== Kantian philosophy ==
In his doctrine of transcendental idealism, Kant argued the sum of all objects, the empirical world, is a complex of appearances whose existence and connection occur only in our representations. Kant introduces the thing-in-itself as follows:

And we indeed, rightly considering objects of sense as mere appearances, confess thereby that they are based upon a thing in itself, though we know not this thing as it is in itself, but only know its appearances, viz., the way in which our senses are affected by this unknown something.

— Prolegomena, § 32

== Criticism ==
=== F. H. Jacobi ===
The first to criticize the concept of a thing-in-itself was F. H. Jacobi, with the expression:

I could not enter into the system without the assumption of the concept of the thing-in-itself and, on the other hand, I could not remain in it with this concept.

=== G. E. Schulze ===
The anonymously published work Aenesidemus was one of the most successful criticisms against Kantian philosophy. According to Kant's teaching, things-in-themselves cannot cause appearances, since the category of causality can only find application to objects of experience. Kant, therefore, does not have the right to claim the existence of things-in-themselves.

This contradiction was subsequently generally accepted as being the main problem of the thing-in-itself. The attack on the thing-in-itself, and the skeptical work in general, had a big impact on Fichte, and Schopenhauer called G. E. Schulze, who was revealed to be the author, “the acutest" of Kant's opponents.

=== Johann Gottlieb Fichte ===
Initially Fichte embraced Kantian philosophy, including a thing-in-itself, but the work of Schulze made him revise his position.

Aenesidemus, which I consider one of the most remarkable products of our decade, has convinced me of something which I admittedly already suspected: that even after the labors of Kant and Reinhold, philosophy is still not a science. Aenesidemus has shaken my own system to its very foundations, and, since one cannot live very well under the open sky, I have been forced to construct a new system. I am convinced that philosophy can become a science only if it is generated from one single principle, but that it must then become just as self-evident as geometry.

The system which Fichte subsequently published, Science of Knowledge, scraps the thing-in-itself.

=== Schopenhauer ===
In his "Critique of the Kantian Philosophy" appended to The World as Will and Representation (1818), Arthur Schopenhauer agreed with the critics that the manner in which Kant had introduced the thing-in-itself was inadmissible, but he considered that Kant was right to assert its existence and praised the distinction between thing-in-itself and appearance as Kant's greatest merit. As he wrote in volume 1 of his Parerga and Paralipomena, "Fragments of the History of Philosophy," §13:

Kant was guided by the truth certainly felt that there lies behind every phenomenon a being-in-itself whence such phenomenon obtains its existence ... But he undertook to derive this from the given representation itself by the addition of its laws that are known to us a priori. Yet just because these are a priori, they cannot lead to something independent of, and different from, the phenomenon or representation; and so for this purpose we have to pursue an entirely different course. The inconsistencies in which Kant was involved through the faulty course taken by him in this respect were demonstrated to him by G. E. Schultze who in his ponderous and diffuse manner expounded the matter first anonymously in his Aenesidemus ... and then in his Kritik der theoretischen Philosophie.

=== Mainländer ===
A unique position is taken by Philipp Mainländer, who hailed Kant for breaking the rules of his own philosophy to proclaim the existence of a thing-in-itself.

He did it, because he feared nothing more than the allegation, that his philosophy is pure idealism, which makes the whole objective world into illusion and takes away all reality from it. The three remarks of the first part of the Prolegomena are, with this in mind, very much worth reading. I cannot condemn this great inconsequence. It was the smaller one of two evils, and Kant bravely embraced it. (Note: "Er that es, weil er Nichts mehr fürchtete als den Vorwurf, seine Philosophie sei der reine Idealismus, welcher die ganze objektive Welt zu Schein macht und ihr jede Realität nimmt. Die drei Anmerkungen zum ersten Buche der Prolegomena sind, in dieser Hinsicht, sehr lesenswerth. Diese große Inconsequenz kann ich nicht verdammen. Sie war das kleinere von zwei Uebeln, und Kant ergriff es herzhaft.")

== See also ==
- Acatalepsy – Concept of human knowledge in philosophy
- Master argument – That mind-independent objects do not exist because it is impossible to conceive of them (a viewpoint put forward by George Berkeley)
- Noumenon – Object or event that exists independently of the senses of a posited object or event that exists independently of human sense and/or perception
- Use–mention distinction – Distinction between using a word and mentioning it, according to which it is necessary to make a distinction between using a word (or phrase) and mentioning it as a thing in itself
