= W. H. Walsh =

British philosopher and classicist (1913-1986)

William Henry Walsh FBA FRSE (/wɒlʃ/; 10 December 1913 – 7 April 1986) was a 20th-century British philosopher and classicist. He was an expert on Immanuel Kant. In an essay on "Meaning in History", he argued that the role of the historian is to neither to catalogue events nor to trace chains of causation, but rather to draw out connections between details and events in ways that make the past, if never quite tidy, then still broadly intelligible.

== Life ==
Walsh was born in Leeds on 10 December 1913, the son of Fred Walsh and his wife May Stephens. His father was a Baptist and his mother a Catholic, but he was raised with no religion in his life. He was one of three children, with two sisters Mary and Muriel. The family moved to Baildon near Bradford in his infancy. Walsh was educated at Bradford and Leeds Grammar School on a scholarship.

Walsh studied classics at Merton College, Oxford under G. R. G. Mure, taking his BA in 1935; he became a Fellow of Merton the following year, and held his Fellowship (with two short intervals, 1940–1945 and 1946–1947) until 1960.

During the Second World War, Walsh served in the Royal Signal Corps (1940–1941). He was posted to the Cryptography School at Bedford, and then to do intelligence work for the Foreign Office (1941–1945), based at Bletchley Park.

Walsh was made Professor of Logic and Metaphysics in the University of Edinburgh (1960–1979) later emeritus; and one of the three Vice Principals of the University of Edinburgh (1975–1979).

In 1979, Walsh was elected a Fellow of the Royal Society of Edinburgh. His proposers were John Steven Watson, Matthew Black, Norman Gash and Frank Gunstone.

Walsh returned to Merton College in 1979.

Walsh died of melanoma of the brain on 7 April 1986.

== Family ==
In 1938, Walsh married Frances Beatrix "Trixie" Ruth Pearson. She studied French at Oxford. They had three children, one son and two daughters, all of whom went to Oxford University.

== Publications ==
- Reason and Experience (1947)
- An Introduction to Philosophy of History (1951)
- Metaphysics (1963)
- Hegelian Ethics (1969)
- Kant's Criticism of Metaphysics (1976)

== Sources ==
- Leon Pompa, ‘Walsh, William Henry (1913–1986)’, Oxford Dictionary of National Biography, Oxford University Press, 2004 .
- ‘WALSH, Prof. William Henry’, Who Was Who, A & C Black, 1920–2008; online edn, Oxford University Press, Dec 2007 accessed 18 Feb 2012 (subscription required).
- "Papers of William Henry Walsh (1913-1986)." Edinburgh University Archives. Accessed February 2012.
