= Robert L. Leahy =

American psychologist and author (born 1946)

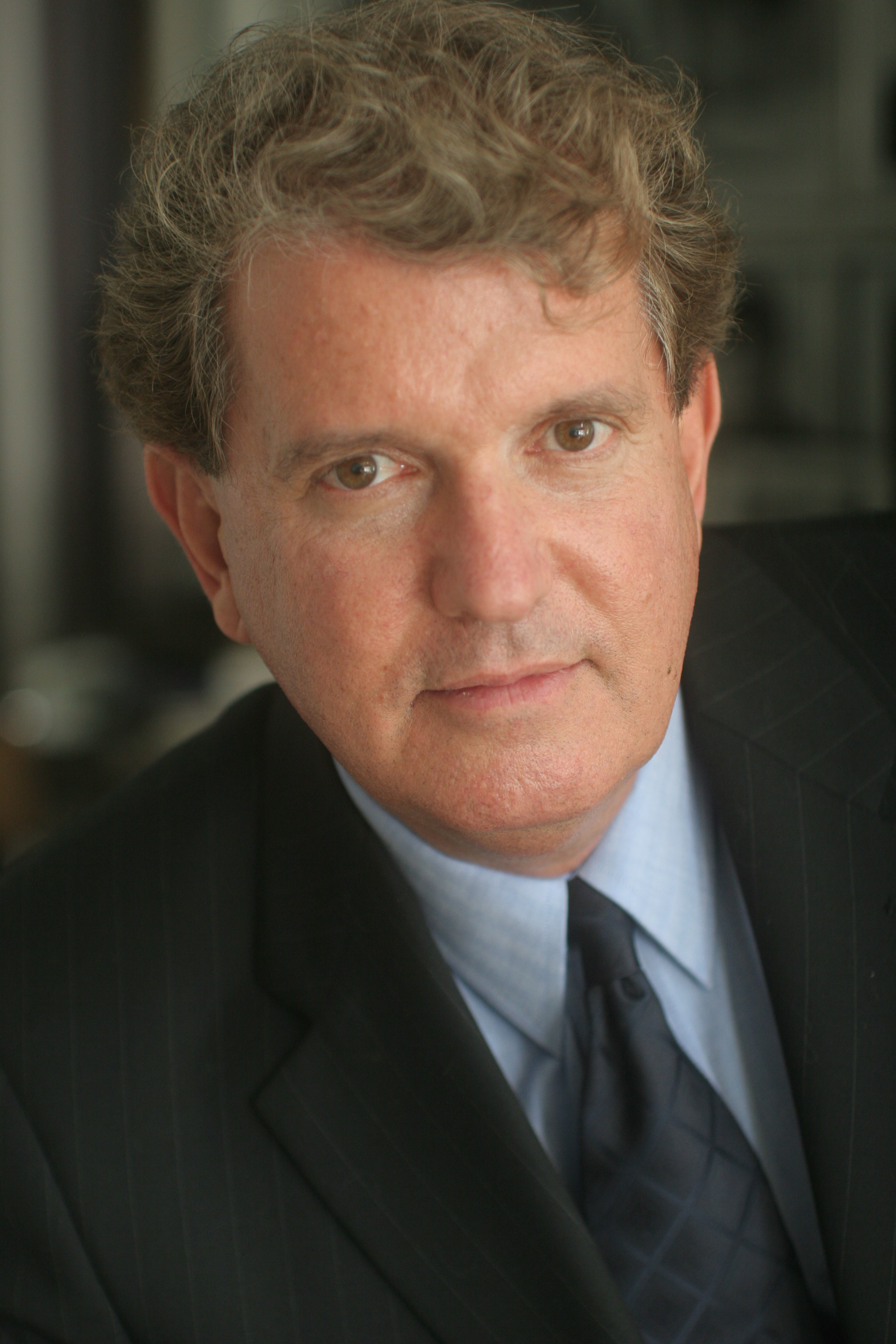
- Born: 8 March 1946 (age 80); Alexandria, Virginia, United States of America
- Education: Yale University
- Occupations: Psychologist, author

Robert L. Leahy is a psychologist and author and editor of 29 books dedicated to cognitive behavior therapy. He is the director of the American Institute for Cognitive Therapy in New York and Clinical Professor of Psychology in the Department of Psychiatry at Weill Cornell Medical College.

== Early life and education ==
Leahy was born in Alexandria, Virginia, the son of James J Leahy, a salesman, and Lillian DeVita, an executive secretary. His parents separated when he was 18 months old and his mother moved Robert to New Haven, Connecticut. He was educated at Yale University (B.A, M.S, MPhil., PhD) and later completed a post-doctoral fellowship in the Department of Psychiatry at the University of Pennsylvania Medical School under the direction of Aaron T. Beck, the founder of Cognitive Therapy.

== Career and research interests ==
Leahy became interested in Beck's Cognitive Therapy model after becoming disillusioned with the psychodynamic model, which he felt lacked sufficient empirical support. Many of his clinical books have been instrumental in disseminating the Cognitive Therapy model in its application to the treatment of depression, bipolar disorder, anxiety disorders, jealousy, and emotion regulation. In addition, he has published widely on the application of the cognitive model to the therapeutic relationship, transference and counter-transference, resistance to change, and beliefs about emotion regulation that may underpin problematic strategies for coping with or responding to emotions in the therapeutic context. His clinical and popular audience books have been translated into 21 languages.

Leahy has expanded the cognitive model with his social cognitive model of emotion, which he refers to as Emotional Schema Therapy. According to this model, individuals differ in their beliefs about the legitimacy of certain emotions, their duration, the ability to express emotions, the need to control emotions, how similar their emotions are to those of others, and the ability to tolerate ambivalent feelings. These beliefs and the strategies connected to them are referred to as "emotional schemas". The Emotional Schema Model draws on Beck's Cognitive Therapy model, the metacognitive model advanced by Adrian Wells, the Acceptance and Commitment Model advanced by Steven C. Hayes, and on social cognitive research on attribution processes and implicit theories of emotion. Leahy has described how his model can help in understanding and treating jealousy, envy, ambivalence, and other emotions, and how these emotional schemas can impact intimate relationships and affect the therapeutic relationship.

In addition to his work on emotional schemas, Leahy has written about problematic styles of judgment and decision making that are relevant in depression and anxiety disorders. These include biased evaluations in over-estimating or under-estimating risk, sunk-cost effects, regret anticipation, rumination over regret, and inaccurate predictions of emotions following anticipated outcomes.

== Awards and achievements ==
In 2014, Robert L. Leahy received the Aaron T. Beck Award from the Academy of Cognitive Therapy. In 2021, he received an Honorary Doctor of Humane Letters degree from the Philadelphia College of Osteopathic Medicine. Leahy was named the Honorary Life-time President of the New York City Cognitive Behavioral Therapy Association and Distinguished Founding Fellow, Diplomate, of the Academy of Cognitive Therapy. In 2023, Leahy was awarded the Outstanding Clinician Award from Association of Behavioral and Cognitive Therapies (ABCT) and was named ABCT's first Global Ambassador.

== Organizational affiliations ==
Leahy is past-president of the Association of Behavioral and Cognitive Therapies (ABCT) and the International Association of Cognitive Behavioral Therapy (IACBT). He is the former Editor of The Journal of Cognitive Psychotherapy and current Associate Editor of the International Journal of Cognitive Therapy.

== Books ==
- Bipolar Disorder: A Cognitive Therapy Approach (2001) ISBN 1557987890
- Psychology And The Economic Mind: Cognitive Processes and Conceptualization (2002) ISBN 082615042X
- Psychological Treatment of Bipolar Disorder (2003) ISBN 9781593852306
- Roadblocks in Cognitive-Behavioral Therapy: Transforming Challenges into Opportunities for Change (2003) ISBN 1593853734
- The Worry Cure: Seven Steps to Stop Worry from Stopping You (2005) ISBN 9781400097661
- Contemporary Cognitive Therapy: Theory, Research, and Practice (2006) ISBN 1401921647
- The Therapeutic Relationship in the Cognitive Behavioral Psychotherapies (2007) ISBN 0415384370
- Anxiety Free: Unravel Your Fears Before They Unravel You (2009) ISBN 0415384370
- Treatment Resistant Anxiety Disorders: Resolving Impasses to Symptom Remission (2009) ISBN 1138881724
- Beat the Blues Before They Beat You: How to Overcome Depression (2010) ISBN 978-1-4019-2866-7
- Emotion Regulation in Psychotherapy: A Practitioner's Guide (2011) ISBN 1609184831
- Treatment Plans and Interventions for Depression and Anxiety Disorders, 2e (2011) ISBN 9781609186494
- Overcoming Resistance in Cognitive Therapy (2012) ISBN 1572309369
- Keeping Your Head After Losing Your Job: How to Survive Unemployment (2013) ISBN 978-1-933016-62-7
- Emotional Schema Therapy (2015) ISBN 9781462540792
- Cognitive Therapy Techniques, Second Edition: A Practitioner's Guide (2017) ISBN 1462528228
- Science and Practice in Cognitive Therapy: Foundations, Mechanisms, and Applications (2018) ISBN 9781462533404
- The Jealousy Cure: Learn to Trust, Overcome Possessiveness, and Save Your Relationship (2018) ISBN 1626259755
- Emotional Schema Therapy: Distinctive Features (2019) ISBN 1138561142
- Don't Believe Everything You Feel: A CBT Workbook to Identify Your Emotional Schemas and Find Freedom from Anxiety and Depression (2020) ISBN 1684034809
- If Only... Finding Freedom from Regret (2022) ISBN 9781462547821
