= Arthur Schopenhauer =

German philosopher (1788–1860)

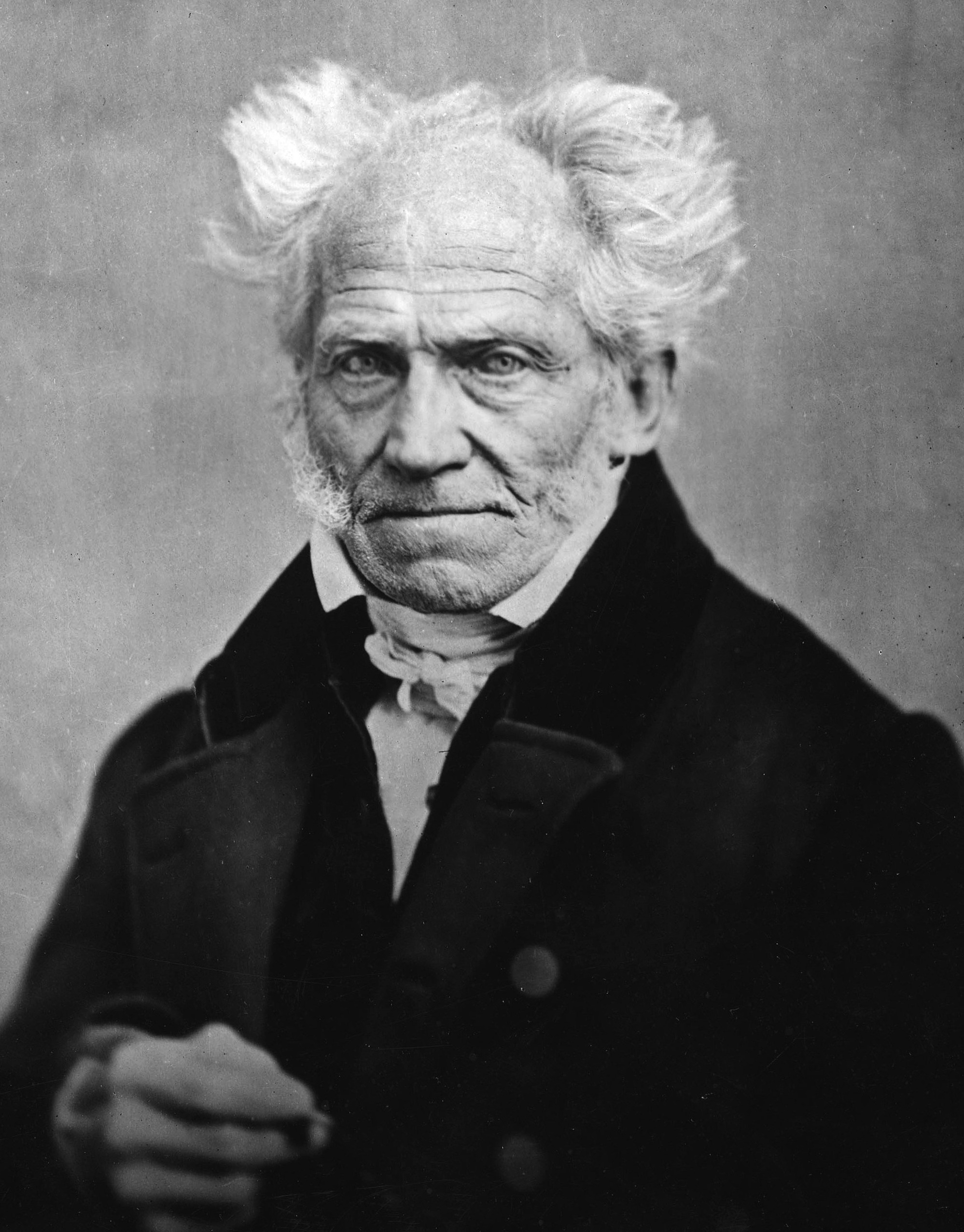
- Schopenhauer in 1859 photograph by Johann Schäfer
- Born: 22 February 1788; Danzig (Gdańsk), Crown of the Kingdom of Poland, Polish–Lithuanian Commonwealth
- Died: 21 September 1860 (aged 72); Frankfurt, German Confederation
- Resting place: Hauptfriedhof Frankfurt (Frankfurt Main Cementery), Frankfurt
- Children: 2 (Note: Despite his anti-natalist views and never marrying, Schopenhauer had at least two illegitimate daughters (in 1819 and 1836), both of whom died in infancy.)
- Relatives: Johanna Schopenhauer (mother); Adele Schopenhauer (sister)

Education
- Education: Illustrious Gymnasium; University of Göttingen; University of Jena (PhD, 1813)
- Thesis: On the Fourfold Root of the Principle of Sufficient Reason (1813)
- Academic advisors: Karl Christian Friedrich Krause; Gottlob Ernst Schulze

Philosophical work
- Era: 19th-century philosophy
- Region: Western philosophy
- School: Post-Kantian philosophy; Transcendental idealism (disputed); Metaphysical voluntarism; Philosophical pessimism
- Institutions: University of Berlin
- Main interests: Metaphysics, aesthetics, ethics, morality, psychology
- Notable ideas: Animal ethics; Anthropic principle; Criticism of religion; Criticism of German idealism; Eternal justice; Fourfold root of the principle of sufficient reason; Hedgehog's dilemma; Philosophical pessimism; Principium individuationis; Schopenhauerian aesthetics; Will as thing in itself; Will to live; Wooden iron

Arthur Schopenhauer (Note: /ˈʃoʊpənhaʊər/ SHOH-pən-how-ər; German: [ˈaʁtuːɐ̯ ˈʃoːpn̩haʊɐ]) (22 February 1788 – 21 September 1860), also known as the "Philosopher of Pessimism", was a German philosopher and writer. He is known for his 1818 work The World as Will and Representation (expanded in 1844), which characterizes the phenomenal world as the manifestation of a blind and irrational noumenal will. Building on the transcendental idealism of Immanuel Kant, Schopenhauer developed an atheistic, metaphysical and ethical system that rejected the contemporaneous ideas of German idealism.

Schopenhauer was among the first philosophers in the Western tradition to share and affirm significant tenets of Indian philosophy, such as asceticism, denial of the self, and the notion of the world-as-appearance. His work has been described as an exemplary manifestation of philosophical pessimism. Though his work failed to garner substantial attention during his lifetime, he had a posthumous impact across various disciplines, including philosophy, literature, and science. His writing on aesthetics, morality, and psychology has influenced many thinkers and artists.

== Early life and education ==
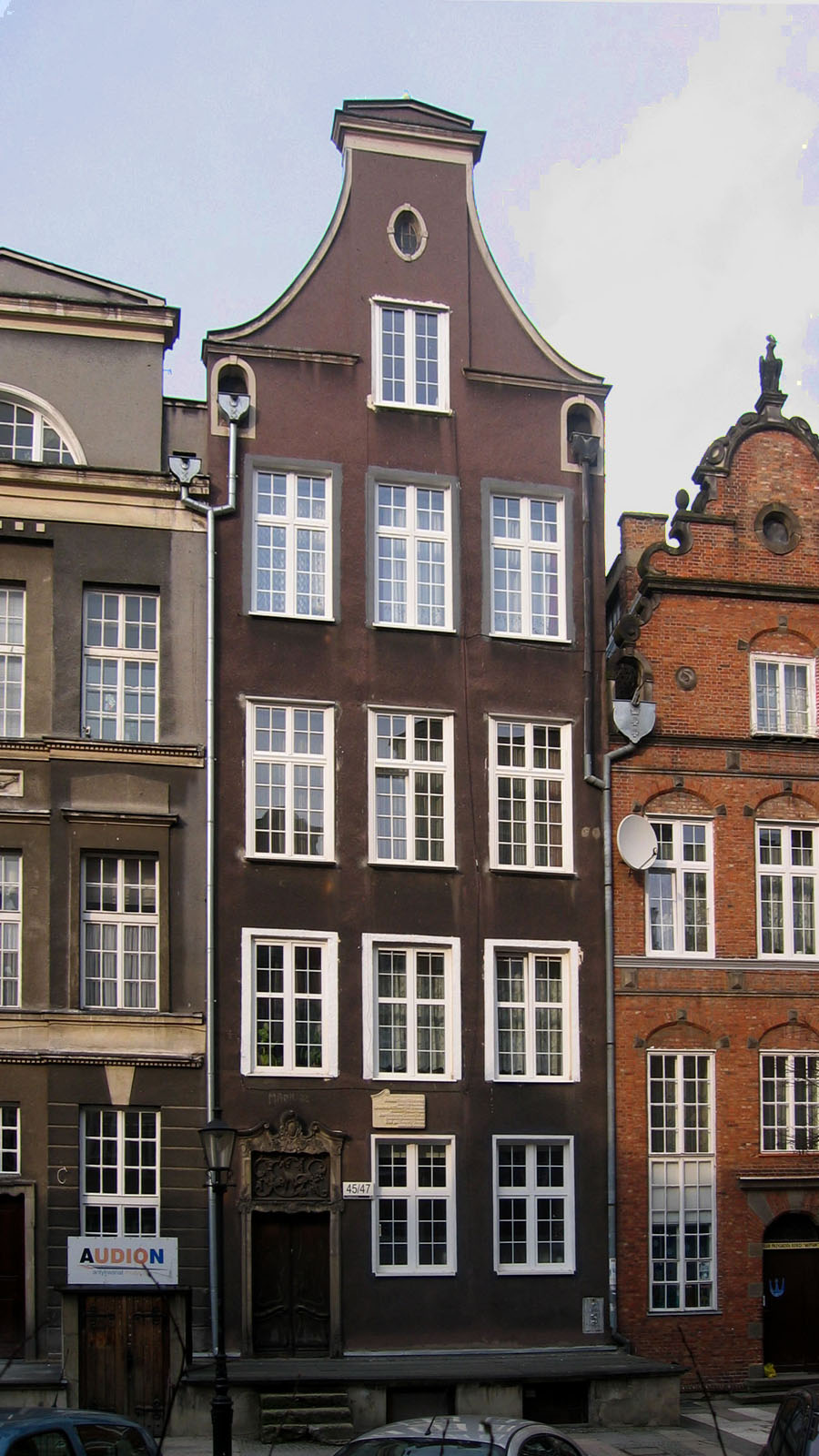
Schopenhauer's birthplace house, Ul. Św. Ducha (formerly Heiliggeistgasse), Gdańsk

Arthur Schopenhauer was born on 22 February 1788, in Danzig (then part of the Polish–Lithuanian Commonwealth; present-day Gdańsk, Poland) on Heiliggeistgasse (present-day Św. Ducha 47), the son of Heinrich Floris Schopenhauer and his wife Johanna Schopenhauer (née Trosiener), both descendants of wealthy German patrician families. While they both came from Protestant backgrounds, they were not very religious; they supported the French Revolution and were republicans, cosmopolitans, and Anglophiles. When Danzig became part of Prussia in 1793, Heinrich moved to Hamburg—a free city with a republican constitution. His firm continued trading in Danzig, where most of their extended families remained. Adele, Arthur's only sibling, was born on 12 July 1797.

In 1797, Arthur was sent to Le Havre to live with the family of his father's business associate, Grégoire de Blésimaire. He seemed to enjoy his two-year stay there, learning to speak French and fostering a life-long friendship with Jean Anthime Grégoire de Blésimaire. As early as 1799, Arthur started playing the flute.

In 1803 he accompanied his parents on a European tour of Holland, Britain, France, Switzerland, Austria and Prussia. Viewed as primarily a pleasure tour, Heinrich used the opportunity to visit some of his business associates abroad.

Heinrich presented Arthur with a choice: he could either stay at home to begin preparations for university or travel with them to further his merchant education. Arthur chose to travel with them. He deeply regretted his choice later because the merchant training was very tedious. He spent twelve weeks of the tour attending school in Wimbledon, London, where he was confused by strict and intellectual Anglicans, whom he described as shallow. He continued to sharply criticize Anglican religiosity later in life despite his general Anglophilia. He was also under pressure from his father, who became very critical of his educational results.

In 1805 Heinrich drowned in a canal near their home in Hamburg. Although it was possible that his death was accidental, his wife and son believed that it was suicide. He was prone to anxiety and depression, each becoming more pronounced later in his life. Heinrich had become so fussy that even his wife started to doubt his mental health. "There was, in the father's life, some dark and vague source of fear which later made him hurl himself to his death from the attic of his house in Hamburg."

Arthur showed similar moodiness during his youth and often acknowledged that he inherited it from his father. There were other instances of serious mental health problems on his father's side of the family. Despite his hardship, Schopenhauer liked his father and later referred to him in a positive light. Heinrich left the family with a significant inheritance split in three among Johanna and the children. Arthur was entitled to control of his part when he reached the age of majority. He invested it conservatively in government bonds and earned annual interest that was more than double the salary of a university professor. After quitting his merchant apprenticeship, with encouragement from his mother, he dedicated himself to studies at the Ernestine Gymnasium, Gotha, in Saxe-Gotha-Altenburg. While there, he also enjoyed a social life among the local nobility, spending large amounts of money, which deeply concerned his frugal mother. He left the Gymnasium after writing a satirical poem about one of the schoolmasters. Although Arthur claimed he left voluntarily, his mother's letter indicates that he may have been expelled.

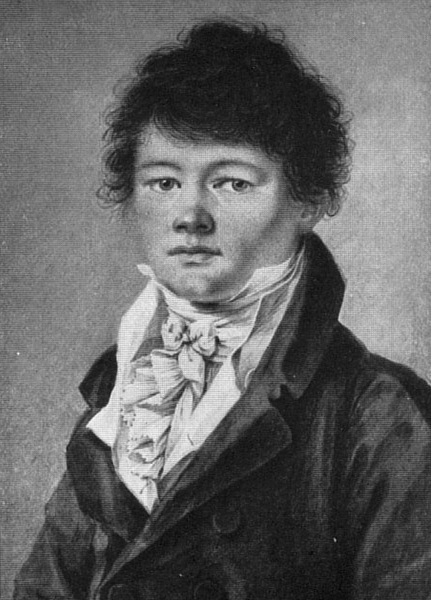
Schopenhauer in his youth

Arthur spent two years as a merchant in honor of his dead father. During this time, he had doubts about being able to start a new life as a scholar. Most of his prior education was as a practical merchant and he had trouble learning Latin; a prerequisite for an academic career.

His mother moved away, with her daughter Adele, to Weimar—then the center of German literature—to enjoy social life among writers and artists. Arthur and his mother did not part on good terms. In one letter, she wrote: "You are unbearable and burdensome, and very hard to live with; all your good qualities are overshadowed by your conceit, and made useless to the world simply because you cannot restrain your propensity to pick holes in other people." His mother, Johanna, was generally described as vivacious and sociable. She lived another 24 years.

Arthur moved to Hamburg to live with his friend Jean Anthime, who was also studying to become a merchant.

=== Education ===
He moved to Weimar but did not live with his mother, who even tried to discourage him from coming by explaining that they would not get along very well. Their relationship deteriorated even further due to their temperamental differences. He accused his mother of being financially irresponsible, flirtatious and seeking to remarry, which he considered an insult to his father's memory. His mother, while professing her love to him, criticized him sharply for being moody, tactless, and argumentative, and urged him to improve his behavior so that he would not alienate people. Arthur concentrated on his studies, which were now going very well, and he also enjoyed the usual social life such as balls, parties and theater. By that time Johanna's famous salon was well established among local intellectuals and dignitaries, the most celebrated of them being Johann Wolfgang von Goethe. Arthur attended her parties, usually when he knew that Goethe would be there—although the famous writer and statesman seemed not even to notice the young and unknown student. It is possible that Goethe kept a distance because Johanna warned him about her son's depressive and combative nature, or because Goethe was then on bad terms with Arthur's language instructor and roommate, Franz Passow. Schopenhauer was also captivated by Karoline Jagemann, whom he found beautiful and who was the mistress of Karl August, Grand Duke of Saxe-Weimar-Eisenach, and he wrote to her his only known love poem. Despite his later celebration of asceticism and negative views of sexuality, Schopenhauer occasionally had sexual affairs—usually with women of lower social status, such as servants, actresses and sometimes prostitutes. In a letter to his friend Anthime he claims that such affairs continued even in his mature age and admits that he had two out-of-wedlock daughters (born in 1819 and 1836), both of whom died in infancy. In their youthful correspondence Arthur and Anthime were somewhat boastful and competitive about their sexual exploits—but Schopenhauer seemed aware that women usually did not find him very charming or physically attractive, and his desires often remained unfulfilled.

He left Weimar to become a student at the University of Göttingen in 1809. There are no written reasons about why Schopenhauer chose that university instead of the then more famous University of Jena, but Göttingen was known as more modern and scientifically oriented, with less attention given to theology. Law or medicine were usual choices for young men of Schopenhauer's status who also needed a career and income; he chose medicine due to his scientific interests. Among his notable professors were Bernhard Friedrich Thibaut, Arnold Hermann Ludwig Heeren, Johann Friedrich Blumenbach, Friedrich Stromeyer, Heinrich Adolf Schrader, Johann Tobias Mayer and Konrad Johann Martin Langenbeck. He studied metaphysics, psychology and logic under Gottlob Ernst Schulze, the author of Aenesidemus, who made a strong impression and advised him to concentrate on Plato and Immanuel Kant. He decided to switch from medicine to philosophy around 1810–11 and he left Göttingen, which did not have a strong philosophy program: besides Schulze, the only other philosophy professor was Friedrich Bouterwek, whom Schopenhauer disliked. He did not regret his medicinal and scientific studies; he claimed that they were necessary for a philosopher, and even in Berlin he attended more lectures in sciences than in philosophy. During his days at Göttingen, he spent considerable time studying, but also continued his flute playing and social life. His friends included Friedrich Gotthilf Osann, Karl Witte, Christian Charles Josias von Bunsen and William Backhouse Astor Sr.

He arrived at the newly founded University of Berlin for the winter semester of 1811–12. At the same time, his mother had just begun her literary career; she published her first book in 1810, a biography of her friend Karl Ludwig Fernow, which was a critical success. Arthur attended lectures by the prominent post-Kantian philosopher Johann Gottlieb Fichte, but quickly found many points of disagreement with his epistemology; he also found Fichte's lectures tedious and hard to understand. He later mentioned Fichte only in critical, negative terms—seeing his philosophy as a lower-quality version of Kant's and considering it useful only because Fichte's poor arguments unintentionally highlighted some failings of Kantianism. He also attended the lectures of the famous Protestant theologian Friedrich Schleiermacher, whom he also quickly came to dislike. His notes and comments on Schleiermacher's lectures show that Schopenhauer was becoming very critical of religion and moving towards atheism. He learned by self-directed reading; besides Plato, Kant and Fichte he also read the works of Friedrich Wilhelm Joseph Schelling, Jakob Friedrich Fries, Friedrich Heinrich Jacobi, Francis Bacon, John Locke and much current scientific literature. He attended philological courses by August Böckh and Friedrich August Wolf and continued his naturalistic interests with courses by Martin Heinrich Klaproth, Paul Erman, Johann Elert Bode, Ernst Gottfried Fischer, Johann Horkel, Friedrich Christian Rosenthal and Hinrich Lichtenstein (Lichtenstein was also a friend whom he met at one of his mother's parties in Weimar).

== Early work ==
Schopenhauer left Berlin in a rush in 1813, fearing that the city could be attacked and that he could be pressed into military service as Prussia had just joined the war against France. He returned to Weimar but left after less than a month, disgusted by the fact that his mother was now living with her supposed lover, Georg Friedrich Konrad Ludwig Müller von Gerstenbergk, a civil servant twelve years younger than she; he considered the relationship an act of infidelity to his father's memory. He settled for a while in Rudolstadt, hoping that no army would pass through the small town. He spent his time in solitude, hiking in the mountains and the Thuringian Forest and writing his dissertation, On the Fourfold Root of the Principle of Sufficient Reason.

Schopenhauer completed his dissertation at about the same time as the French army was defeated at the Battle of Leipzig. He became irritated by the arrival of soldiers in the town and accepted his mother's invitation to visit her in Weimar. She tried to convince him that her relationship with Gerstenbergk was platonic and that she had no intention of remarrying. But Schopenhauer remained suspicious and often came into conflict with Gerstenbergk, who he considered untalented, pretentious, and nationalistic. His mother had just published her second book, Reminiscences of a Journey in the Years 1803, 1804, and 1805, a description of their family tour of Europe, which quickly became a hit. She found his dissertation incomprehensible and said it was unlikely that anyone would ever buy a copy. In a fit of temper Arthur told her that people would read his work long after the "rubbish" she wrote was totally forgotten. In fact, although they considered her novels of dubious quality, the Brockhaus publishing firm held her in high esteem because they consistently sold well. Hans Brockhaus later claimed that his predecessors "saw nothing in this manuscript, but wanted to please one of our best-selling authors by publishing her son's work. We published more and more of her son Arthur's work and today nobody remembers Johanna, but her son's works are in steady demand and contribute to Brockhaus' reputation." He kept large portraits of the pair in his office in Leipzig for the edification of his new editors.

Also contrary to his mother's prediction, Schopenhauer's dissertation made an impression on Goethe, to whom he sent it as a gift. Although it is doubtful that Goethe agreed with Schopenhauer's philosophical positions, he was impressed by his intellect and extensive scientific education. Their subsequent meetings and correspondence were a great honor to a young philosopher, who was finally acknowledged by his intellectual hero. They mostly discussed Goethe's newly published (and somewhat lukewarmly received) work on colour theory. Schopenhauer soon started writing his own treatise on the subject, On Vision and Colors, which in many points differed from his teacher's. Although they remained polite towards each other, their growing theoretical disagreements—and especially Schopenhauer's extreme self-confidence and tactless criticisms—soon made Goethe become distant again and after 1816 their correspondence became less frequent. Schopenhauer later admitted that he was greatly hurt by this rejection, but he continued to praise Goethe, and considered his color theory a great introduction to his own.

Another important experience during his stay in Weimar was his acquaintance with Friedrich Majer—a historian of religion, orientalist and disciple of Johann Gottfried Herder—who introduced him to Eastern philosophy (see also Indology). Schopenhauer was immediately impressed by the Upanishads (he called them "the production of the highest human wisdom", and believed that they contained superhuman concepts) and the Buddha, and put them on a par with Plato and Kant. He continued his studies by reading the Bhagavad Gita, an amateurish German journal Asiatisches Magazin, and Asiatick Researches by the Asiatic Society. Schopenhauer held a profound respect for Indian philosophy; and loved Hindu texts. Although he never revered a Buddhist text he regarded Buddhism as the most distinguished religion. His studies on Hindu and Buddhist texts were constrained by the lack of adequate literature, and the latter were mostly restricted to Theravada Buddhism. He also claimed that he formulated most of his ideas independently, and only later realized the similarities with Buddhism.

Schopenhauer read the Latin translation and praised the Upanishads in his main work, The World as Will and Representation (1819), as well as in his Parerga and Paralipomena (1851), and commented:

In the whole world there is no study so beneficial and so elevating as that of the Upanishads. It has been the solace of my life, it will be the solace of my death.

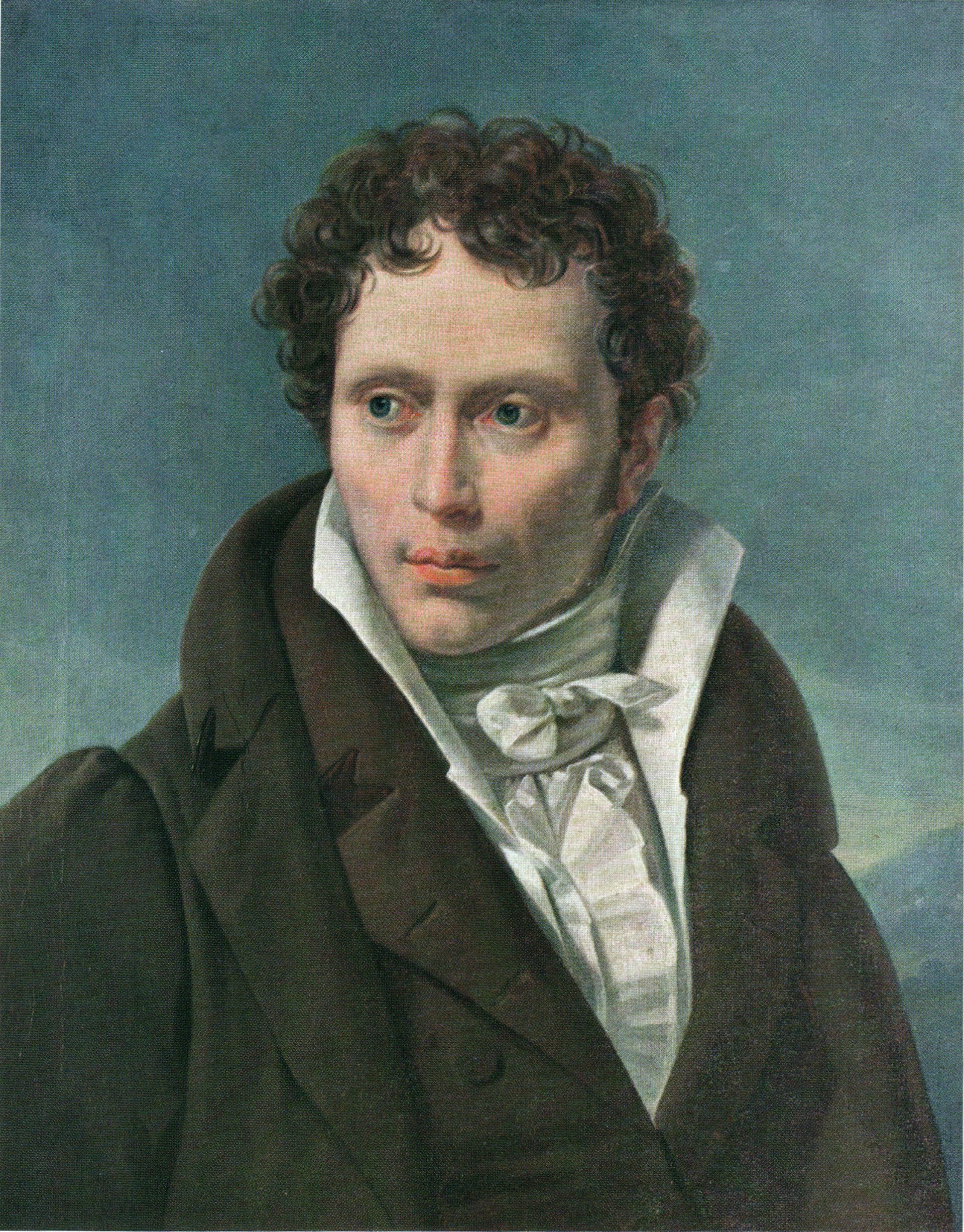
Schopenhauer in 1815. Portrait by Ludwig Sigismund Ruhl.

As the relationship with his mother fell to a new low, in May 1814 he left Weimar and moved to Dresden. He continued his philosophical studies, enjoyed the cultural life, socialized with intellectuals and engaged in sexual affairs. His friends in Dresden were Johann Gottlob von Quandt, Friedrich Laun, Karl Christian Friedrich Krause and Ludwig Sigismund Ruhl, a young painter who made a romanticized portrait of him in which he improved some of Schopenhauer's unattractive physical features. His criticisms of local artists occasionally caused public quarrels when he ran into them in public. Schopenhauer's main occupation during his stay in Dresden was his seminal philosophical work, The World as Will and Representation, which he started writing in 1814 and finished in 1818. He was recommended to the publisher Friedrich Arnold Brockhaus by Baron Ferdinand von Biedenfeld, an acquaintance of his mother. Although Brockhaus accepted his manuscript, Schopenhauer made a poor impression because of his quarrelsome and fussy attitude, as well as very poor sales of the book after it was published in December 1818.

In September 1818, while waiting for his book to be published and conveniently escaping an affair with a maid that caused an unwanted pregnancy, Schopenhauer left Dresden for a year-long vacation in Italy. He visited Venice, Bologna, Florence, Naples and Milan, travelling alone or accompanied by mostly English tourists he met. He spent the winter months in Rome, where he accidentally met his acquaintance Karl Witte and engaged in numerous quarrels with German tourists in the Caffè Greco, among them Johann Friedrich Böhmer, who also mentioned his insulting remarks and unpleasant character. He enjoyed art, architecture, and ancient ruins, attended plays and operas, and continued his philosophical contemplation and love affairs. One of his affairs supposedly became serious, and for a while he contemplated marriage to a rich Italian noblewoman—but, despite his mentioning this several times, no details are known and it may have been Schopenhauer exaggerating. He corresponded regularly with his sister Adele and became close to her as her relationship with Johanna and Gerstenbergk also deteriorated. She informed him about their financial troubles as the banking house of A. L. Muhl in Danzig—in which her mother invested their whole savings and Arthur a third of his—was near bankruptcy. Arthur offered to share his assets, but his mother refused and became further enraged by his insulting comments. The women managed to receive only thirty percent of their savings while Arthur, using his business knowledge, took a suspicious and aggressive stance towards the banker and eventually received his part in full. The affair additionally worsened the relationships among all three members of the Schopenhauer family.

He shortened his stay in Italy because of the trouble with Muhl and returned to Dresden. Disturbed by the financial risk and the lack of responses to his book he decided to take an academic position since it provided him with both income and an opportunity to promote his views. He contacted his friends at universities in Heidelberg, Göttingen and Berlin and found Berlin most attractive. He scheduled his lectures to coincide with those of the famous philosopher Georg Wilhelm Friedrich Hegel, whom Schopenhauer described as a "clumsy charlatan". He was especially appalled by Hegel's supposedly poor knowledge of natural sciences and tried to engage him in a quarrel about it already at his test lecture in March 1820. Hegel was also facing political suspicions at the time, when many progressive professors were dismissed following the Carlsbad Decrees, while Schopenhauer carefully mentioned in his application that he had no interest in politics. Despite their differences and the arrogant request to schedule lectures at the same time as his own, Hegel still voted to accept Schopenhauer to the university. Only five students turned up to Schopenhauer's lectures, and he dropped out of academia. A late essay, "On University Philosophy", expressed his resentment towards the work conducted in academies.

== Later life ==
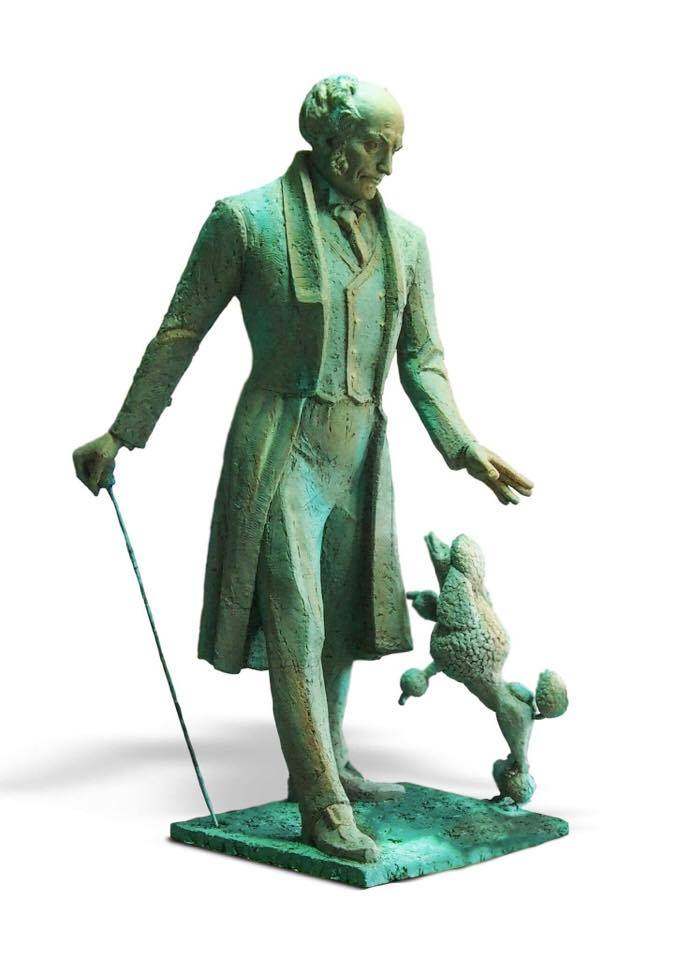
Sculpture of Arthur Schopenhauer by Giennadij Jerszow

After his efforts in academia, he continued to travel extensively, visiting Leipzig, Nuremberg, Stuttgart, Schaffhausen, Vevey, Milan and spending eight months in Florence. Before he left for his three-year travel, Schopenhauer had an incident with his Berlin neighbor, 47-year-old seamstress Caroline Louise Marquet. The details of the August 1821 incident are unknown. He claimed that he had just pushed her from his entrance after she had rudely refused to leave, and that she had purposely fallen to the ground so that she could sue him. She claimed that he had attacked her so violently that she had become paralyzed on her right side and unable to work. She immediately sued him, and the court case lasted until May 1827, when a court found Schopenhauer guilty and forced him to pay her an annual pension until her death in 1842.

Schopenhauer enjoyed Italy, where he studied art and socialized with Italian and English nobles. It was his last visit to the country. He left for Munich and stayed there for a year, mostly recuperating from various health problems, some of them possibly caused by venereal diseases (the treatment his doctor used suggests syphilis). He contacted publishers, offering to translate Hume into German and Kant into English, but his proposals were declined. Returning to Berlin, he began to study Spanish so he could read some of his favorite authors in their original language. He liked Pedro Calderón de la Barca, Lope de Vega, Miguel de Cervantes and especially Baltasar Gracián. He also made failed attempts to publish his translations of their works. A few attempts to revive his lectures—again scheduled at the same time as Hegel's—also failed, as did his inquiries about relocating to other universities.

During his Berlin years, Schopenhauer occasionally mentioned his desire to marry and have a family. For a while he was unsuccessfully courting 17-year-old Flora Weiss, who was 22 years younger than he was. His unpublished writings from that time show that he was already very critical of monogamy but still not advocating polygyny—instead musing about a polyamorous relationship that he called "tetragamy". He had an on-and-off relationship with a young dancer, Caroline Richter (she also used the surname Medon after one of her ex-lovers). They met when he was 33 and she was 19 and working at the Berlin Opera. She had already had numerous lovers and a son out of wedlock, and later gave birth to another son, this time to an unnamed foreign diplomat (she soon had another pregnancy but the child was stillborn). As Schopenhauer was preparing to escape from Berlin in 1831, due to a cholera epidemic, he offered to take her with him on the condition that she leave her young son behind. She refused and he went alone; in his will he left her a significant sum of money, but insisted that it should not be spent in any way on her second son.

Schopenhauer claimed that, in his last year in Berlin, he had a prophetic dream that urged him to escape from the city. As he arrived in his new home in Frankfurt, he supposedly had another supernatural experience, an apparition of his dead father and his mother, who was still alive. This experience led him to spend some time investigating paranormal phenomena and magic. He was quite critical of the available studies and claimed that they were mostly ignorant or fraudulent, but he did believe that there are authentic cases of such phenomena and tried to explain them through his metaphysics as manifestations of the will.

Upon his arrival in Frankfurt, he experienced a period of depression and declining health. He renewed his correspondence with his mother, and she seemed concerned that he might commit suicide like his father. By now Johanna and Adele were living very modestly. Johanna's writing did not bring her much income, and her popularity was waning. Their correspondence remained reserved, and Arthur seemed undisturbed by her death in 1838. His relationship with his sister grew closer and he corresponded with her until she died in 1849.

In July 1832, Schopenhauer left Frankfurt for Mannheim but returned in July 1833 to remain there for the rest of his life, except for a few short journeys. He lived alone except for a succession of pet poodles named Atman and Butz. In 1836, he published On the Will in Nature. In 1838, he sent his essay "On the Freedom of the Will" to the contest of the Royal Norwegian Society of Sciences in 1838 and won the prize in 1839. He sent another essay, "On the Basis of Morality", to the Royal Danish Society of Sciences in 1839, but did not win the (1840) prize despite being the only contestant. The Society was appalled that several distinguished contemporary philosophers were mentioned in a very offensive manner, and claimed that the essay missed the point of the set topic and that the arguments were inadequate. Schopenhauer, who had been very confident that he would win, was enraged by this rejection. He published both essays as The Two Basic Problems of Ethics. The first edition, published September 1840 but with an 1841 date, again failed to draw attention to his philosophy. In the preface to the second edition, in 1860, he was still pouring insults on the Royal Danish Society. Two years later, after some negotiations, he managed to convince his publisher, Brockhaus, to print the second, updated edition of The World as Will and Representation. That book was again mostly ignored and the few reviews were mixed or negative.

Schopenhauer began to attract some followers, mostly outside academia, among practical professionals (several of them were lawyers) who pursued private philosophical studies. He jokingly referred to them as "evangelists" and "apostles". One of the most active early followers was Julius Frauenstädt, who wrote numerous articles promoting Schopenhauer's philosophy. He was also instrumental in finding another publisher after Brockhaus declined to publish Parerga and Paralipomena, believing that it would be another failure. Though Schopenhauer later stopped corresponding with him, claiming that he did not adhere closely enough to his ideas, Frauenstädt continued to promote Schopenhauer's work. They renewed their communication in 1859 and Schopenhauer named him heir for his literary estate. Frauenstädt also became the editor of the first collected works of Schopenhauer.

During the German revolution of 1848 Schopenhauer witnessed a violent upheaval in Frankfurt after General Hans Adolf Erdmann von Auerswald and Prince Felix Lichnowsky were murdered. He became worried for his own safety and property. Even earlier in life he had had such worries and kept a sword and loaded pistols near his bed to defend himself from thieves. He gave a friendly welcome to Austrian soldiers who wanted to shoot revolutionaries from his window and as they were leaving he gave one of the officers his opera glasses to help him monitor rebels. The rebellion passed without any loss to Schopenhauer and he later praised Alfred I, Prince of Windisch-Grätz, for restoring order. He even modified his will, leaving a large part of his property to a Prussian fund that helped soldiers who became invalids while fighting rebellion in 1848 or the families of soldiers who died in battle. As Young Hegelians were advocating change and progress, Schopenhauer claimed that misery is natural for humans and that, even if some utopian society were established, people would still fight each other out of boredom, or would starve due to overpopulation.

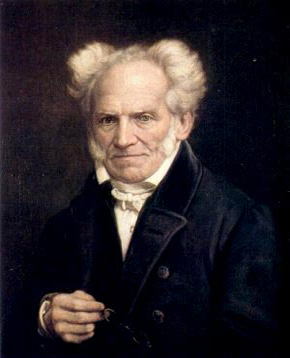
1855 painting of Schopenhauer by Jules Lunteschütz

In 1851, Schopenhauer published Parerga and Paralipomena, which contains essays that are supplementary to his main work. It was his first successful, widely read book, partly due to the work of his disciples who wrote praising reviews. The essays that proved most popular were the ones that actually did not contain the basic philosophical ideas of his system. Many academic philosophers considered him a great stylist and cultural critic but did not take his philosophy seriously. His early critics liked to point out similarities of his ideas to those of Fichte and Schelling, or to claim that there were numerous contradictions in his philosophy. Both criticisms enraged Schopenhauer. He was becoming less interested in intellectual fights, but encouraged his disciples to do so. His private notes and correspondence show that he acknowledged some of the criticisms regarding contradictions, inconsistencies, and vagueness in his philosophy, but claimed that he was not concerned about harmony and agreement in his propositions and that some of his ideas should not be taken literally but instead as metaphors.

Academic philosophers were also starting to notice his work. In 1856 the University of Leipzig sponsored an essay contest about Schopenhauer's philosophy, which was won by Rudolf Seydel's very critical essay. Schopenhauer's friend Jules Lunteschütz made the first of his four portraits of him—which Schopenhauer did not particularly like—which was soon sold to a wealthy landowner, Carl Ferdinand Wiesike, who built a house to display it. Schopenhauer seemed flattered and amused by this, and would claim that it was his first chapel. As his fame increased, copies of paintings and photographs of him were being sold and admirers were visiting the places where he had lived and written his works. People visited Frankfurt's Englischer Hof to observe him dining. Admirers gave him gifts and asked for autographs. He complained that he still felt isolated due to his not very social nature and the fact that many of his good friends had already died from old age.

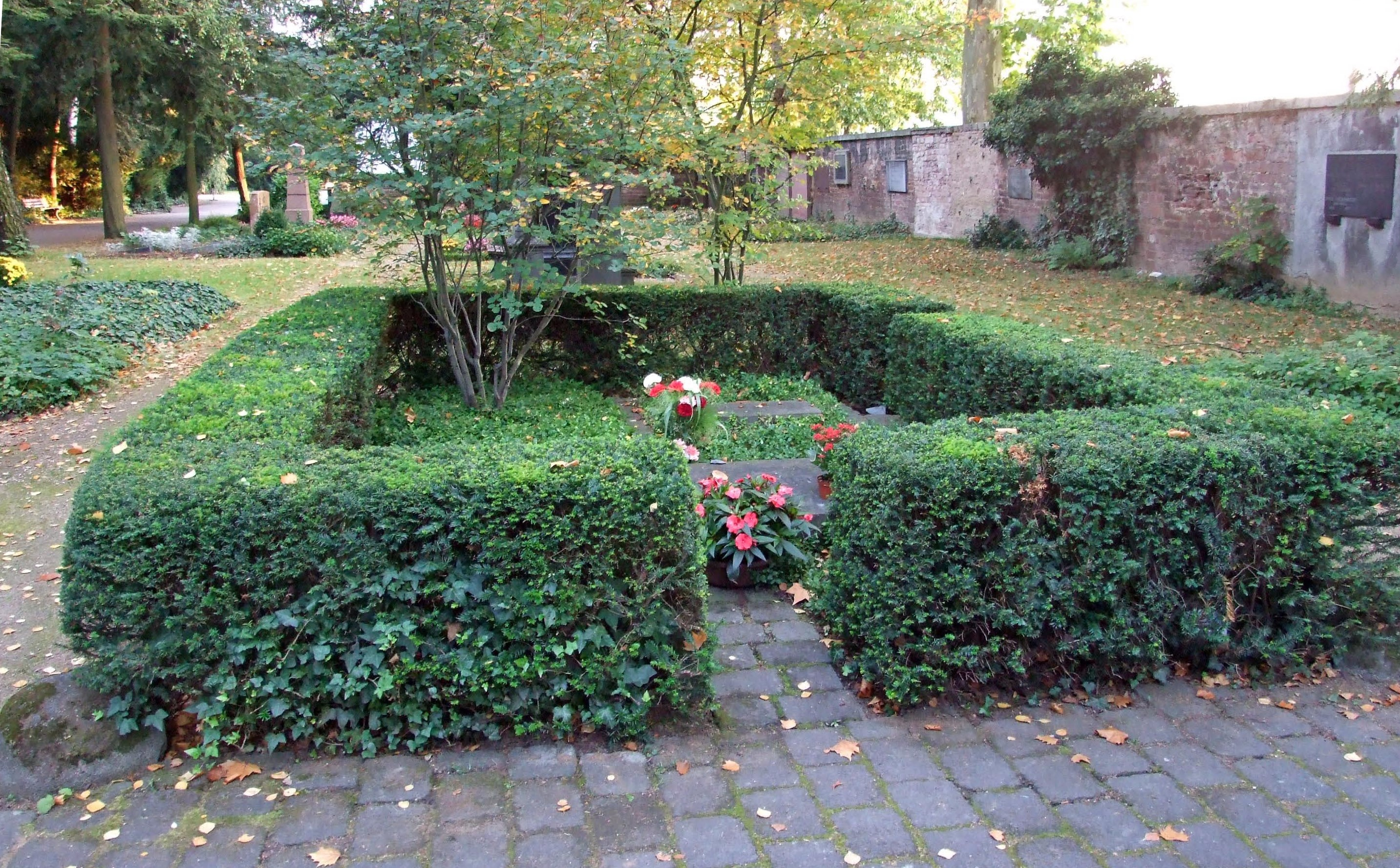
Grave at the Hauptfriedhof in Frankfurt

He remained healthy in his own old age, which he attributed to regular walks no matter the weather and always getting enough sleep. He had a great appetite and could read without glasses, but his hearing had been declining since his youth and he developed problems with rheumatism. He remained active and lucid, continued his reading, writing and correspondence until his death. The numerous notes that he made during these years, amongst others on aging, were published posthumously under the title Senilia. In the spring of 1860 his health began to decline, and he experienced shortness of breath and heart palpitations; in September he suffered inflammation of the lungs and, although he was starting to recover, he remained very weak. The last friend to visit him was Wilhelm Gwinner, who said that Schopenhauer was concerned that he would not be able to finish his planned additions to Parerga and Paralipomena but was at peace with dying. He died of pulmonary-respiratory failure on 21 September 1860 while sitting at home on his couch. He died at age 72 and had a funeral conducted by a Lutheran minister.

== Philosophy ==
=== Theory of perception ===
In November 1813 Johann Wolfgang von Goethe invited Schopenhauer to help him on his Theory of Colours. Although Schopenhauer considered colour theory a minor matter, he accepted the invitation out of admiration for Goethe. Nevertheless, these investigations led him to his most important discovery in epistemology: finding a demonstration for the a priori nature of causality.

Kant had openly admitted that it was Hume's skeptical assault on causality that motivated the critical investigations in Critique of Pure Reason and gave an elaborate proof to show that causality is a priori. After Gottlob Ernst Schulze had made it plausible that Kant had not disproven Hume's skepticism, it was up to those loyal to Kant's project to prove this important matter.

The difference between the approaches of Kant and Schopenhauer was this: Kant simply declared that the empirical content of perception is "given" to us from outside, an expression with which Schopenhauer often expressed his dissatisfaction. He, on the other hand, was occupied with the questions: how do we get this empirical content of perception; how is it possible to comprehend subjective sensations "limited to my skin" as the objective perception of things that lie "outside" of me?

The sensations in the hand of a man born blind, on feeling an object of cubic shape, are quite uniform and the same on all sides and in every direction: the edges, it is true, press upon a smaller portion of his hand, still nothing at all like a cube is contained in these sensations. His Understanding draws the immediate and intuitive conclusion from the resistance felt, that this resistance must have a cause, which then presents itself through that conclusion as a hard body; and through the movements of his arms in feeling the object, while the hand's sensation remains unaltered, he constructs the cubic shape in Space. If the representation of a cause and of Space, together with their laws, had not already existed within him, the image of a cube could never have proceeded from those successive sensations in his hand.

Causality is therefore not an empirical concept drawn from objective perceptions, as Hume had maintained; instead, as Kant had said, objective perception presupposes knowledge of causality.

By this intellectual operation, comprehending every effect in our sensory organs as having an external cause, the external world arises. With vision, finding the cause is essentially simplified due to light acting in straight lines. We are seldom conscious of the process that interprets the double sensation in both eyes as coming from one object, that inverts the impressions on the retinas, and that uses the change in the apparent position of an object relative to more distant objects provided by binocular vision to perceive depth and distance.

Schopenhauer stresses the importance of the intellectual nature of perception; the senses furnish the raw material by which the intellect produces the world as representation. He set out his theory of perception for the first time in On Vision and Colors, and, in the subsequent editions of Fourfold Root, an extensive exposition is given in § 21.

=== World as representation ===
Schopenhauer saw his philosophy as an extension of Kant's, and used the results of Kant's theoretical and epistemological investigations (transcendental idealism) as starting point for his own. Kant had argued that the empirical world is merely a complex of appearances whose existence and connection occur only in our mental representations. Schopenhauer did not deny that the external world existed and was known empirically, yet he followed Kant in claiming that our knowledge and experience of the world is always in some sense dependent on us. For Schopenhauer in particular, the spatiotemporal form and causal structure of the external world are contributed to our experiences of it by the mind as it renders perceptions. Schopenhauer reiterates this in the first sentence of his main work: "The world is my representation (Die Welt ist meine Vorstellung)". Everything that there is for cognition (the entire world) exists simply as an object in relation to a subject—a 'representation' to a subject. Everything that belongs to the world is, therefore, 'subject-dependent'. In Book One of The World as Will and Representation, Schopenhauer considers the world from this angle—that is, insofar as it is representation.

Kant had previously argued that we perceive reality as something spatial and temporal not because reality is inherently spatial and temporal, but because that is how our minds operate in perceiving an object. Therefore, understanding objects in space and time represents our 'contribution' to an experience. For Schopenhauer, Kant's 'greatest service' lay in the 'differentiation between phenomena and the thing-in-itself (noumena), based on the proof that between everything and us there is always a perceiving mind.' In other words, Kant's primary achievement is to demonstrate that instead of being a blank slate where reality merely reveals its character, the mind, with sensory support, actively participates in constructing reality. Thus, Schopenhauer believed that Kant had shown that the everyday world of experience, and indeed the entire material world related to space and time, is merely 'appearance' or 'phenomena,' entirely distinct from the thing-in-itself.'

=== World as will ===
In Book Two of The World as Will and Representation, Schopenhauer considers what the world is beyond the aspect of it that appears to us—that is, the aspect of the world beyond representation, the world considered "in-itself" or "noumena", its inner essence. The very being in-itself of all things, Schopenhauer argues, is will (Wille). The empirical world that appears to us as representation has plurality and is ordered in a spatio-temporal framework. The world as thing in-itself must exist outside the subjective forms of space and time. Although the world manifests itself to our experience as a multiplicity of objects (the "objectivation" of the will), each element of this multiplicity has the same blind essence striving towards existence and life. Human rationality is merely a secondary phenomenon that does not distinguish humanity from the rest of nature at the fundamental, essential level. The advanced cognitive abilities of human beings, Schopenhauer argues, serve the ends of willing—an illogical, directionless, ceaseless striving that condemns the human individual to a life of suffering unredeemed by any final purpose. Schopenhauer's philosophy of the will as the essential reality behind the world as representation is often called metaphysical voluntarism.

For Schopenhauer, understanding the world as will leads to ethical concerns (see the ethics section below for further detail), which he explores in the Fourth Book of The World as Will and Representation and again in his two prize essays on ethics, On the Freedom of the Will and On the Basis of Morality. No individual human actions are free, Schopenhauer argues, because they are events in the world of appearance and thus are subject to the principle of sufficient reason: a person's actions are a necessary consequence of motives and the given character of the individual human. Necessity extends to the actions of human beings just as it does to every other appearance, and thus we cannot speak of freedom of individual willing. Albert Einstein quoted the Schopenhauerian idea that "a man can do as he will, but not will as he will." Yet the will as thing in-itself is free, as it exists beyond the realm of representation and thus is not constrained by any of the forms of necessity that are part of the principle of sufficient reason.

According to Schopenhauer, salvation from our miserable existence can come through the will's being "tranquillized" by the metaphysical insight that reveals individuality to be merely an illusion. The saint or 'great soul' intuitively "recognizes the whole, comprehends its essence, and finds that it is constantly passing away, caught up in vain strivings, inner conflict, and perpetual suffering". The negation of the will, in other words, stems from the insight that the world in-itself (free from the forms of space and time) is one. Ascetic practices, Schopenhauer remarks, are used to aid the will's "self-abolition", which brings about a blissful, redemptive "will-less" state of emptiness that is free from striving or suffering.

=== Art and aesthetics ===
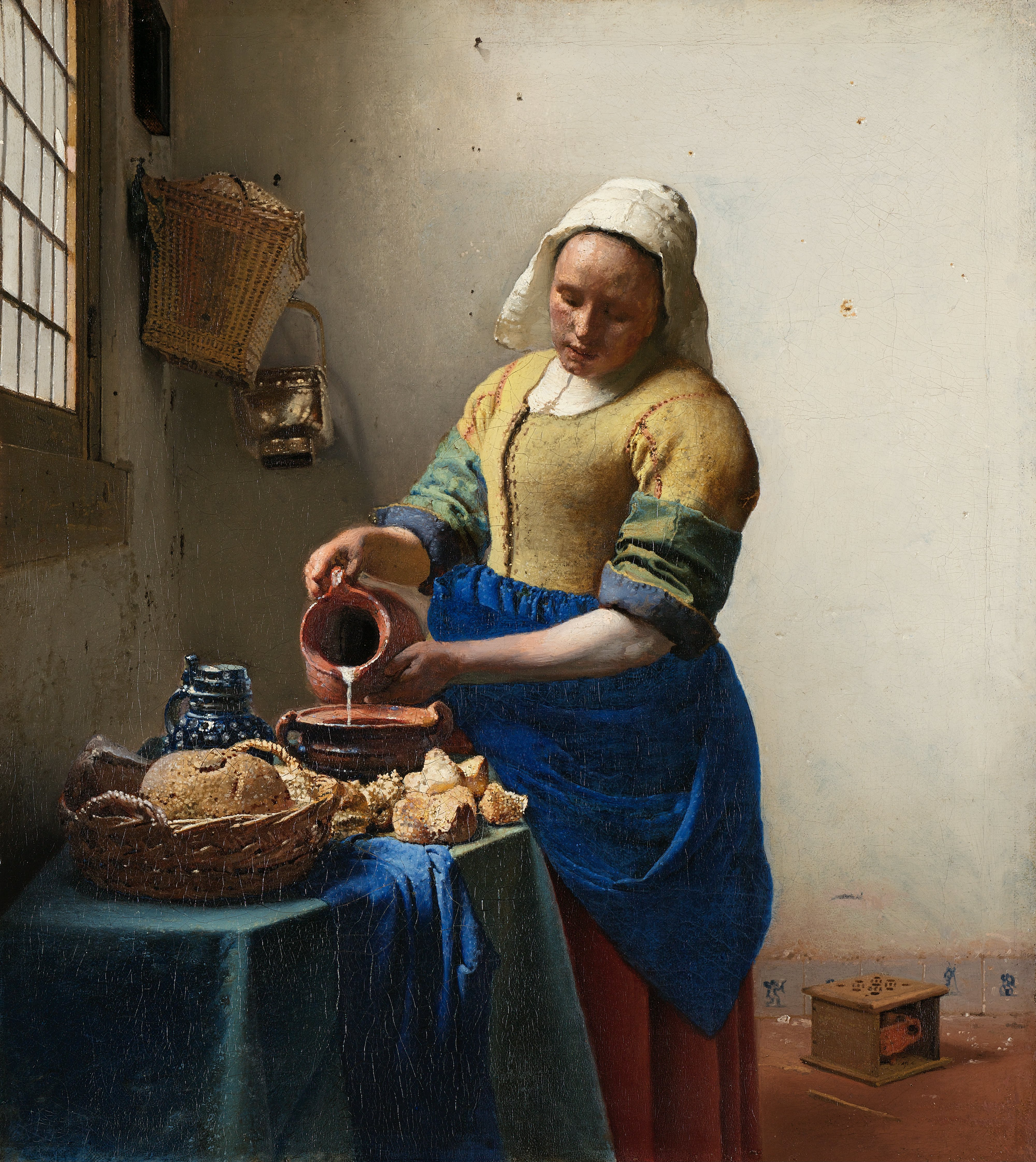
In his main work, Schopenhauer praised the Dutch Golden Age artists, who "directed such purely objective perception to the most insignificant objects, and set up a lasting monument of their objectivity and spiritual peace in paintings of still life. The aesthetic beholder does not contemplate this without emotion."

For Schopenhauer, human "willing"—desiring, craving, etc.—is at the root of suffering. A temporary way to escape this pain is through aesthetic contemplation. Here one moves away from ordinary cognizance of individual things to cognizance of eternal Platonic Ideas—in other words, cognizance that is free from the service of will. In aesthetic contemplation, one no longer perceives an object of perception as something from which one is separated; rather "it is as if the object alone existed without anyone perceiving it, and one can thus no longer separate the perceiver from the perception, but the two have become one, the entirety of consciousness entirely filled and occupied by a single perceptual image". Subject and object are no longer distinguishable, and the Idea comes to the fore.

From this aesthetic immersion, one is no longer an individual who suffers as a result of servitude to one's individual will but, rather, becomes a "pure, will-less, painless, timeless, subject of cognition". The pure, will-less subject of cognition is cognizant only of Ideas, not individual things: this is a kind of cognition that is unconcerned with relations between objects according to the Principle of Sufficient Reason (time, space, cause and effect) and instead involves complete absorption in the object.

Art is the practical consequence of this brief aesthetic contemplation, since it attempts to depict the essence/pure Ideas of the world. Music, for Schopenhauer, is the purest form of art because it is the one that depicts the will itself without it appearing as subject to the Principle of Sufficient Reason, therefore as an individual object. According to Daniel Albright, "Schopenhauer thought that music was the only art that did not merely copy ideas, but actually embodied the will itself". He deemed music a timeless, universal language comprehended everywhere, that can imbue global enthusiasm, if in possession of a significant melody.

=== Mathematics ===
Schopenhauer's realist views on mathematics are evident in his criticism of contemporaneous attempts to prove the parallel postulate in Euclidean geometry. Writing shortly before the discovery of hyperbolic geometry demonstrated the logical independence of the axiom—and long before the general theory of relativity revealed that it does not necessarily express a property of physical space—Schopenhauer criticized mathematicians for trying to use indirect concepts to prove what he held was directly evident from intuitive perception.

The Euclidean method of demonstration has brought forth from its own womb its most striking parody and caricature in the famous controversy over the theory of parallels, and in the attempts, repeated every year, to prove the eleventh axiom (also known as the fifth postulate). The axiom asserts, and that indeed through the indirect criterion of a third intersecting line, that two lines inclined to each other (for this is the precise meaning of "less than two right angles"), if produced far enough, must meet. Now this truth is supposed to be too complicated to pass as self-evident, and therefore needs a proof; but no such proof can be produced, just because there is nothing more immediate.

Throughout his writings, Schopenhauer criticized the logical derivation of philosophies and mathematics from mere concepts, instead of from intuitive perceptions.

In fact, it seems to me that the logical method is in this way reduced to an absurdity. But it is precisely through the controversies over this, together with the futile attempts to demonstrate the directly certain as merely indirectly certain, that the independence and clearness of intuitive evidence appear in contrast with the uselessness and difficulty of logical proof, a contrast as instructive as it is amusing. The direct certainty will not be admitted here, just because it is no merely logical certainty following from the concept, and thus resting solely on the relation of predicate to subject, according to the principle of contradiction. But that eleventh axiom regarding parallel lines is a synthetic proposition a priori, and as such has the guarantee of pure, not empirical, perception; this perception is just as immediate and certain as is the principle of contradiction itself, from which all proofs originally derive their certainty. At bottom this holds good of every geometrical theorem ...

Although Schopenhauer could see no justification for trying to prove Euclid's parallel postulate, he did see a reason for examining another of Euclid's axioms.

It surprises me that the eighth axiom, "Figures that coincide with one another are equal to one another", is not rather attacked. For "coinciding with one another" is either a mere tautology, or something quite empirical, belonging not to pure intuition or perception, but to external sensuous experience. Thus it presupposes mobility of the figures, but matter alone is movable in space. Consequently, this reference to coincidence with one another forsakes pure space, the sole element of geometry, in order to pass over to the material and empirical.

This follows Kant's reasoning.

=== Ethics ===
Schopenhauer asserts that the task of ethics is not to prescribe moral actions that ought to be done, but to investigate moral actions. As such, he states that philosophy is always theoretical: its task to explain what is given.

According to Kant's transcendental idealism, space and time are forms of our sensibility in which phenomena appear in multiplicity. Reality in itself is free from multiplicity, not in the sense that an object is one, but that it is outside the possibility of multiplicity. Two individuals, though they appear distinct, are in-themselves not distinct.

Appearances are entirely subordinated to the principle of sufficient reason. The egoistic individual who focuses his aims on his own interests has to deal with empirical laws as well as he can.

What is relevant for ethics are individuals who can act against their own self-interest. If we take a man who suffers when he sees his fellow men living in poverty and consequently uses a significant part of his income to support their needs instead of his own pleasures, then the simplest way to describe this is that he makes less distinction between himself and others than is usually made.

Regarding how things appear to us, the egoist asserts a gap between two individuals, but the altruist experiences the sufferings of others as his own. In the same way a compassionate man cannot hurt animals, though they appear as distinct from himself.

What motivates the altruist is compassion. The suffering of others is for him not a cold matter to which he is indifferent, but he feels connectiveness to all beings. Compassion is thus the basis of morality.

==== Eternal justice ====
Schopenhauer calls the principle through which multiplicity appears the principium individuationis. When we behold nature we see that it is a cruel battle for existence. Individual manifestations of the will can maintain themselves only at the expense of others—the will, as the only thing that exists, has no other option but to devour itself to experience pleasure. This is a fundamental characteristic of the will, and cannot be circumvented.

Unlike temporal or human justice, which requires time to repay an evil deed and "has its seat in the state, as requiting and punishing", eternal justice "rules not the state but the world, is not dependent upon human institutions, is not subject to chance and deception, is not uncertain, wavering, and erring, but infallible, fixed, and sure". Eternal justice is not retributive, because retribution requires time. There are no delays or reprieves. Instead, punishment is tied to the offence, "to the point where the two become one. ... Tormenter and tormented are one. The [Tormenter] errs in that he believes he is not a partaker in the suffering; the [tormented], in that he believes he is not a partaker in the guilt."

Suffering is the moral outcome of our attachment to pleasure. Schopenhauer deemed that this truth was expressed by the Christian dogma of original sin and, in Eastern religions, by the dogma of rebirth.

==== Quietism ====
He who sees through the principium individuationis and comprehends suffering in general as his own will see suffering everywhere and, instead of fighting for the happiness of his individual manifestation, will abhor life itself since he knows that it is inseparably connected with suffering. For him, a happy individual life in a world of suffering is like a beggar who dreams one night that he is a king.

Those who have experienced this intuitive knowledge cannot affirm life, but exhibit asceticism and quietism, meaning that they are no longer sensitive to motives, are not concerned about their individual welfare, and accept without resistance the evil that others inflict on them. They welcome poverty and neither seek nor flee death. Schopenhauer referred to asceticism as the denial of the will to live.

Human life is a ceaseless struggle for satisfaction and, instead of continuing their struggle, ascetics break it. It does not matter if these ascetics adhere to the dogmata of Christianity or to Dharmic religions, since their way of living is the result of intuitive knowledge.

The Christian mystic and the teacher of the Vedanta philosophy agree in this respect also, they both regard all outward works and religious exercises as superfluous for him who has attained to perfection. So much agreement in the case of such different ages and nations is a practical proof that what is expressed here is not, as optimistic dullness likes to assert, an eccentricity and perversity of the mind, but an essential side of human nature, which only appears so rarely because of its excellence.

==== Antinatalism ====
There is a debate whether Schopenhauer can be considered an early forerunner of antinatalism—the position that we have a duty not to bring people into existence. Some scholars link Schopenhauer to antinatalism and even to David Benatar explicitly. Schopenhauer makes claims that could support categorizing him as an antinatalist: he says that everyone would not agree to come into existence but would reply "no thank you very much", that "life is a business that does not cover its costs", and that if people were rational they would not have children in his poignant rhetorical question:

One should try to imagine that the act of procreation were neither a need, nor accompanied by sexual pleasure, but instead a matter of pure, rational reﬂection; could the human race even continue to exist? Would not everyone, on the contrary, have so much compassion for the coming generation that he would rather spare it the burden of existence, or at least refuse to take it upon himself to cold-bloodedly impose it on them?

On the other hand, one can support the opposite claim, that Schopenhauer rejects the antinatalist conclusion. His worldview sees individual human beings as mere appearances, and who do not come into existence upon birth. Similarly, dying also does not lead to annihilation. So, on a fundamental metaphysical level, it's impossible for us to never exist.

The way to reconcile the two positions is to put importance of coming into existence as a specific individual, who leads life full of suffering, instead of focusing on the metaphysical essence. This, however, does not decide the matter as Schopenhauer explicitly rejects any unconditional moral "oughts", which are necessary to convey the antinatalist position that we have a duty not to bring people into existence.

Furthermore, the new future child, Schopenhauer explains, already strives to exist in the world of appearances. And from the perspective of the parents, the moral judgment of an action depends on the mode of willing: if the motive is not malicious or selfish, then the action cannot be morally wrong.

But in the most important sense, preventing someone from existing as a person prevents them from negating his essence, which is will. Will can only be abolished through a person by getting to know the essence of the world. And this is the only real everlasting redemption. This is also the reason why Schopenhauer rejects suicide as the solution to the condition of life.

So, Schopenhauer presents reasons for two opposing views, each having merit from a different perspective. From the perspective of the individual, it would be good not to bring him into existence to spare him suffering. But from the more fundamental perspective, it's good to allow them to come into being so they can grasp the fundamental truth of the world and attain redemption through annealing the will to life. In this way, he shares the sentiment of antinatalists in their basis but does not follow them to their conclusion.

=== Political and social philosophy ===
==== Politics ====
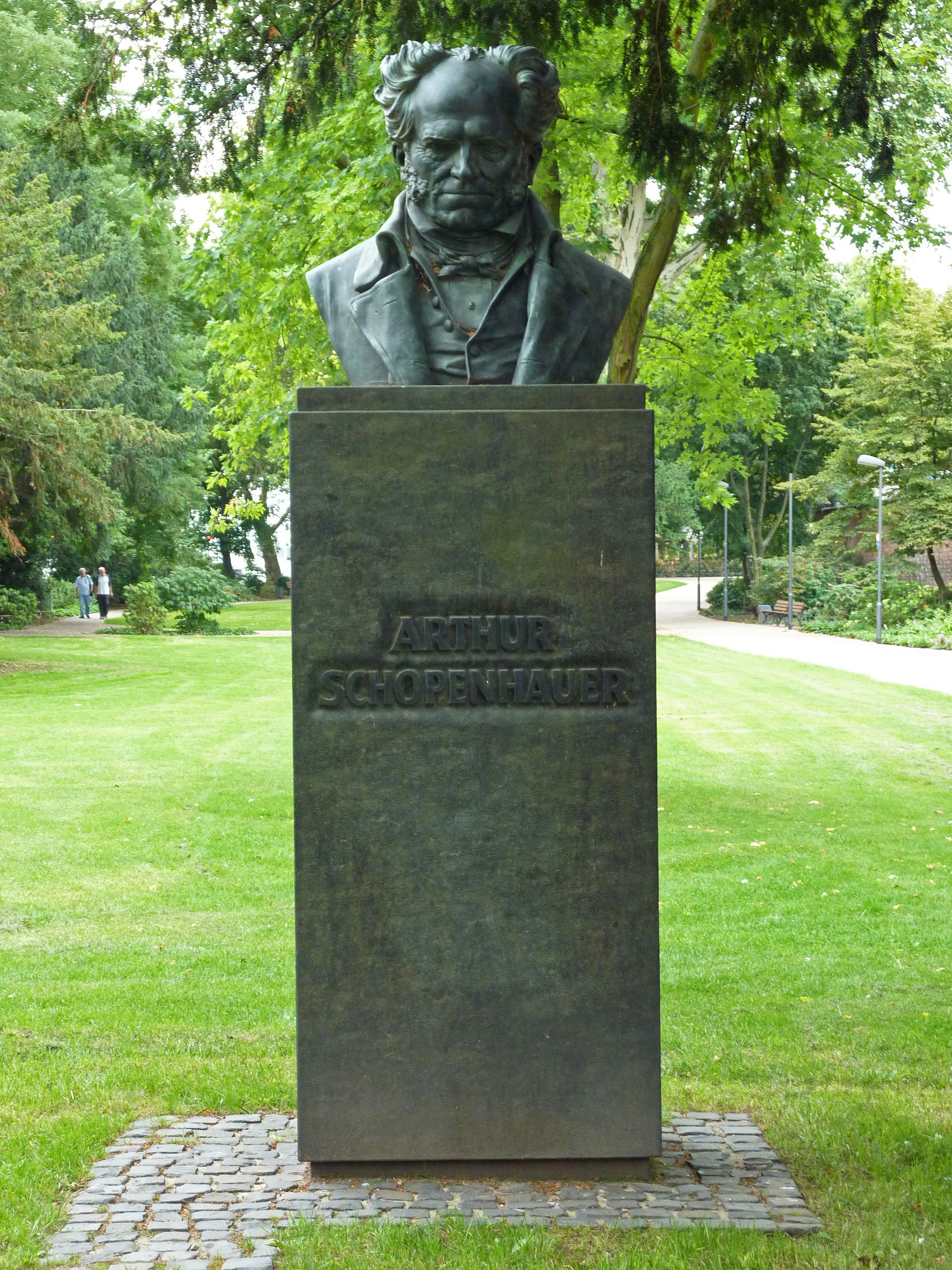
Bust in Frankfurt

Schopenhauer's politics were an echo of his system of ethics, which he elucidated in detail in his Die beiden Grundprobleme der Ethik (the two essays On the Freedom of the Will and On the Basis of Morality).

In occasional political comments in his Parerga and Paralipomena and Manuscript Remains, Schopenhauer described himself as a proponent of limited government. Schopenhauer shared the view of Thomas Hobbes on the necessity of the state and state action to check the innate destructive tendencies of our species. He also defended the independence of the legislative, judicial and executive branches of power, and a monarch as an impartial element able to practise justice (in a practical and everyday sense, not a cosmological one).

He declared that monarchy is "natural to man in almost the same way as it is to bees and ants, to cranes in flight, to wandering elephants, to wolves in a pack in search of prey, and to other animals". Intellect in monarchies, he writes, always has "much better chances against stupidity, its implacable and ever-present foe, than it has in republics; but this is a great advantage." On the other hand, Schopenhauer disparaged republicanism as being "as unnatural to man as it is unfavorable to higher intellectual life and thus to the arts and sciences".

By his own admission, Schopenhauer did not give much thought to politics, and several times he wrote proudly of how little attention he paid "to political affairs of [his] day". In a life that spanned several revolutions in French and German government, and a few continent-shaking wars, he maintained his position of "minding not the times but the eternities". He wrote many disparaging remarks about Germany and the Germans. A typical example is: "For a German it is even good to have somewhat lengthy words in his mouth, for he thinks slowly, and they give him time to reflect."

==== Punishment ====
The State, Schopenhauer claimed, punishes criminals to prevent future crimes. It places "beside every possible motive for committing a wrong a more powerful motive for leaving it undone, in the inescapable punishment. Accordingly, the criminal code is as complete a register as possible of counter-motives to all criminal actions that can possibly be imagined ..." He claimed that this doctrine was not original to him but had appeared in the writings of Plato, Seneca the Younger, Thomas Hobbes, Samuel von Pufendorf and Paul Johann Anselm Ritter von Feuerbach.

==== Races and religions ====
Schopenhauer attributed civilizational primacy to the northern "white races" due to their sensitivity and creativity (except for the ancient Egyptians and Hindus, whom he saw as equal):

The highest civilization and culture, apart from the ancient Hindus and Egyptians, are found exclusively among the white races; and even with many dark peoples, the ruling caste or race is fairer in colour than the rest and has, therefore, evidently immigrated, for example, the Brahmans, the Incas, and the rulers of the South Sea Islands. All this is due to the fact that necessity is the mother of invention because those tribes that emigrated early to the north, and there gradually became white, had to develop all their intellectual powers and invent and perfect all the arts in their struggle with need, want and misery, which in their many forms were brought about by the climate. This they had to do in order to make up for the parsimony of nature and out of it all came their high civilization.

Schopenhauer was fervently opposed to slavery. Speaking of the treatment of slaves in the slave-holding states of the United States, he condemned "those devils in human form, those bigoted, church-going, strict sabbath-observing scoundrels, especially the Anglican parsons among them" for how they "treat their innocent black brothers who through violence and injustice have fallen into their devil's claws". The slave-holding states of North America, Schopenhauer writes, are a "disgrace to the whole of humanity".

Schopenhauer also maintained a marked metaphysical and political anti-Judaism. He argued that Christianity constituted a revolt against what he styled the materialistic basis of Judaism, exhibiting an Indian-influenced ethics reflecting the Aryan-Vedic theme of spiritual self-conquest. He saw this as opposed to the ignorant drive toward earthly utopianism and superficiality of a worldly "Jewish" spirit:

[Judaism] is, therefore, the crudest and poorest of all religions and consists merely in an absurd and revolting theism. It amounts to this that the κύριος ['Lord'], who has created the world, desires to be worshipped and adored; and so above all he is jealous, is envious of his colleagues, of all the other gods; if sacrifices are made to them he is furious and his Jews have a bad time ... It is most deplorable that this religion has become the basis of the prevailing religion of Europe; for it is a religion without any metaphysical tendency. While all other religions endeavor to explain to the people by symbols the metaphysical significance of life, the religion of the Jews is entirely immanent and furnishes nothing but a mere war-cry in the struggle with other nations.

==== Women ====
In his 1851 essay "On Women", Schopenhauer expressed opposition to what he called "Teutonico-Christian stupidity" of "reflexive, unexamined reverence for the female (abgeschmackten Weiberveneration)". He wrote: "Women are directly fitted for acting as the nurses and teachers of our early childhood by the fact that they are themselves childish, frivolous and short-sighted; in a word, they are big children all their life long—a kind of intermediate stage between the child and the full-grown man." He opined that women are deficient in artistic faculties and sense of justice, and expressed his opposition to monogamy. He claimed that "woman is by nature meant to obey". The essay does give some compliments: "women are decidedly more sober in their judgment than [men] are", and are more sympathetic to the suffering of others.

Schopenhauer's writings influenced many, from Friedrich Nietzsche to nineteenth-century feminists, and continue to inspire sexist views today. His biological analysis of the difference between the sexes, and their separate roles in the struggle for survival and reproduction, anticipates some of the claims that were later ventured by sociobiologists and evolutionary psychologists.

When the elderly Schopenhauer sat for a sculpture portrait by the Prussian sculptor Elisabet Ney in 1859, he was much impressed by the young woman's wit and independence, as well as by her skill as a visual artist. After his time with Ney, he told Richard Wagner's friend Malwida von Meysenbug: "I have not yet spoken my last word about women. I believe that if a woman succeeds in withdrawing from the mass, or rather raising herself above the mass, she grows ceaselessly and more than a man."

==== Pederasty ====
In the third, expanded edition of The World as Will and Representation (1859), Schopenhauer added an appendix to his chapter on the Metaphysics of Sexual Love. Schopenhauer wrote that pedastery per se presents itself as "an unnatural" and "highly repugnant monstrosity", as an act that "only a completely perverse, depraved, and degenerate human nature could ever have committed". He added that this behavior arose in nature for the reason that it would prevent such sick individuals from fathering children themselves. Concerning this, he stated that "the vice we are considering appears to work directly against the aims and ends of nature, and that in a matter that is all important and of the greatest concern to her it must in fact serve these very aims, although only indirectly, as a means for preventing greater evils." Schopenhauer ends the appendix with the statement that "by expounding these paradoxical ideas, I wanted to grant to the professors of philosophy a small favour. I have done so by giving them the opportunity of slandering me by saying that I defend and commend pederasty."

==== Heredity and eugenics ====
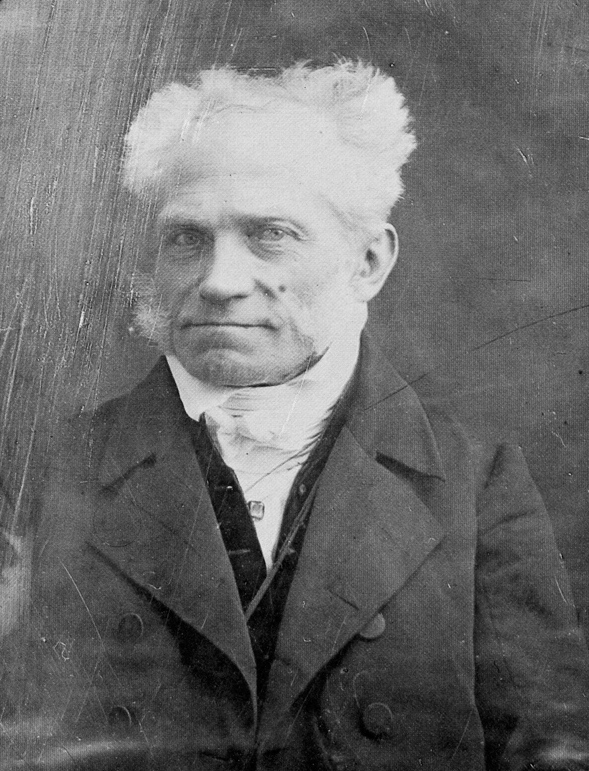
Schopenhauer at age 58 on 16 May 1846

Schopenhauer viewed personality and intellect as inherited. He quotes Horace's saying, "From the brave and good are the brave descended" (Odes, iv, 4, 29) and Shakespeare's line from Cymbeline, "Cowards father cowards, and base things sire base" (IV, 2) to reinforce his hereditarian argument. Mechanistically, Schopenhauer believed that a person inherits his intellect through his mother, and personal character through the father. This belief in heritability of traits informed Schopenhauer's view of love—placing it at the highest level of importance. For Schopenhauer the "final aim of all love intrigues, be they comic or tragic, is really of more importance than all other ends in human life. What it all turns upon is nothing less than the composition of the next generation. ... It is not the weal or woe of any one individual, but that of the human race to come, which is here at stake." This view of the importance for the species of whom we choose to love was reflected in his views on eugenics or good breeding. Here Schopenhauer wrote:

With our knowledge of the complete unalterability both of character and of mental faculties, we are led to the view that a real and thorough improvement of the human race might be reached not so much from outside as from within, not so much by theory and instruction as rather by the path of generation. Plato had something of the kind in mind when, in the fifth book of his Republic, he explained his plan for increasing and improving his warrior caste. If we could castrate all scoundrels and stick all stupid geese in a convent, and give men of noble character a whole harem, and procure men, and indeed thorough men, for all girls of intellect and understanding, then a generation would soon arise which would produce a better age than that of Pericles.

In another context, Schopenhauer reiterated his eugenic thesis: "If you want Utopian plans, I would say: the only solution to the problem is the despotism of the wise and noble members of a genuine aristocracy, a genuine nobility, achieved by mating the most magnanimous men with the cleverest and most gifted women. This proposal constitutes my Utopia and my Platonic Republic." Analysts (e.g., Keith Ansell-Pearson) have suggested that Schopenhauer's anti-egalitarianist sentiment and his support for eugenics influenced the neo-aristocratic philosophy of Friedrich Nietzsche, who initially considered Schopenhauer his mentor.

==== Animal rights ====
As a consequence of his monistic philosophy, Schopenhauer was very concerned about animal welfare and rights. For him, all individual animals, including humans, are essentially phenomenal manifestations of the one underlying Will. For him the word "will" designates force, power, impulse, energy, and desire; it is the closest word we have that can signify both the essence of all external things and our own direct, inner experience. Since every living thing possesses will, humans and animals are fundamentally the same and can recognize themselves in each other. For this reason, he claimed that a good person would have sympathy for animals, who are our fellow sufferers.

Compassion for animals is intimately associated with goodness of character, and it may be confidently asserted that he who is cruel to living creatures cannot be a good man.

— On the Basis of Morality, § 19

Nothing leads more definitely to a recognition of the identity of the essential nature in animal and human phenomena than a study of zoology and anatomy.

— On the Basis of Morality, chapter 8

The assumption that animals are without rights and the illusion that our treatment of them has no moral significance is a positively outrageous example of Western crudity and barbarity. Universal compassion is the only guarantee of morality.

— On the Basis of Morality, chapter 8

In 1841 he praised the establishment in London of the Society for the Prevention of Cruelty to Animals, and in Philadelphia of the Animals' Friends Society. Schopenhauer went so far as to protest using the pronoun "it" in reference to animals because that led to treatment of them as though they were inanimate things. To reinforce his points, Schopenhauer referred to anecdotal reports of the look in the eyes of a monkey who had been shot and also the grief of a baby elephant whose mother had been killed by a hunter.

Schopenhauer was very attached to his succession of pet poodles. He criticized Baruch Spinoza's belief that animals are a mere means for the satisfaction of humans. Tim Madigan wrote that despite all of his bombast, Schopenhauer was a sympathetic character who had concerns for the suffering of animals.

The greatest benefit conferred by the railways is that they spare millions of draught-horses their miserable existences.

— Essays and Aphorisms, p. 171

=== Intellectual interests and affinities ===
Schopenhauer had a wide range of interests, from science and opera to occultism and literature.

In his student years, Schopenhauer went more often to lectures in the sciences than philosophy. He kept a strong interest as his personal library contained near to 200 books of scientific literature at his death, and his works refer to scientific titles not found in the library.

Many evenings were spent in the theatre, opera and ballet; Schopenhauer especially liked the operas of Wolfgang Amadeus Mozart, Gioachino Rossini and Vincenzo Bellini. Schopenhauer considered music the highest art, and played the flute during his whole life.

As a polyglot, he knew German, Italian, Spanish, French, English, Latin and Ancient Greek, and was an avid reader of poetry and literature. He particularly revered Goethe, Petrarch, Pedro Calderón de la Barca and William Shakespeare.

If Goethe had not been sent into the world simultaneously with Kant in order to counterbalance him, so to speak, in the spirit of the age, the latter would have been haunted like a nightmare many an aspiring mind and would have oppressed it with great affliction. But now the two have an infinitely wholesome effect from opposite directions and will probably raise the German spirit to a height surpassing even that of antiquity.

In philosophy, his most important influences were, according to himself, Kant, Plato and the Upanishads.

==== Indology ====
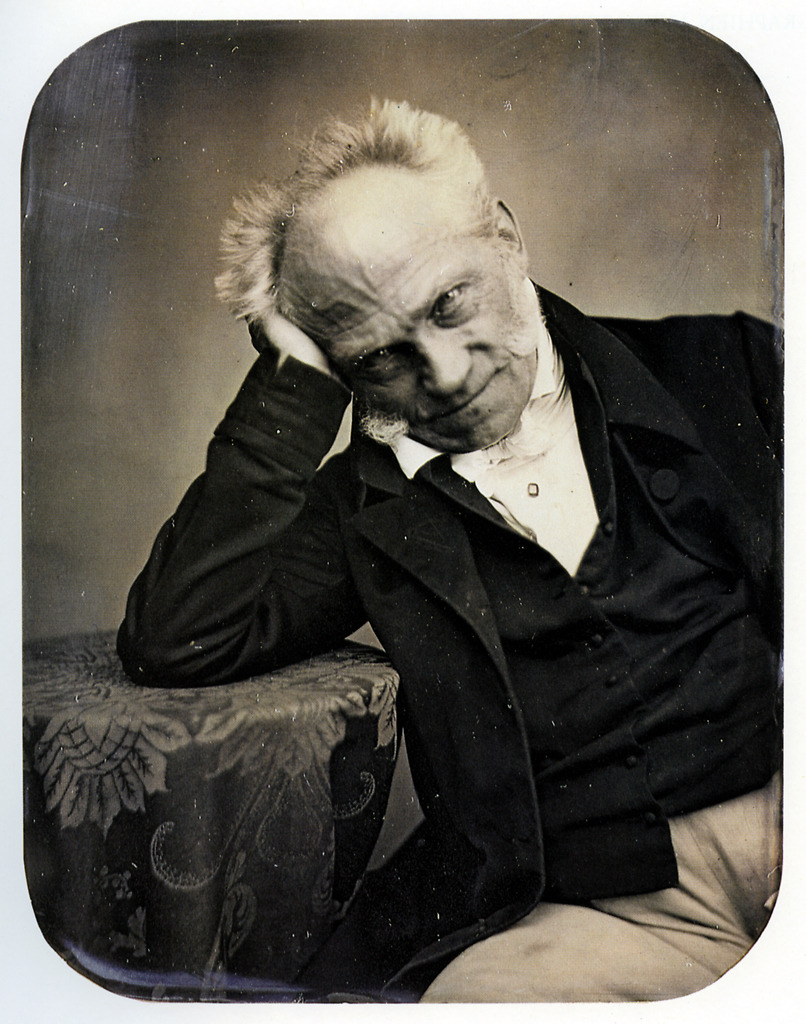
Schopenhauer, 1852

Schopenhauer read the Latin translation of the ancient Hindu texts, the Upanishads, translated by the French writer Anquetil du Perron from the Persian translation of Prince Dara Shukoh entitled Sirre-Akbar ("The Great Secret"). He was so impressed by its philosophy that he called it "the production of the highest human wisdom", and believed it contained superhuman concepts. Schopenhauer considered India as "the land of the most ancient and most pristine wisdom, the place from which Europeans could trace their descent and the tradition by which they had been influenced in so many decisive ways", and regarded the Upanishads as "the most profitable and elevating reading which [...] is possible in the world. It has been the solace of my life, and will be the solace of my death." In The World as Will and Representation, he writes:

If the reader has also received the benefit of the Vedas, the access to which by means of the Upanishads is in my eyes the greatest privilege which this still young century (1818) may claim before all previous centuries, if then the reader, I say, has received his initiation in primeval Indian wisdom, and received it with an open heart, he will be prepared in the very best way for hearing what I have to tell him. It will not sound to him strange, as to many others, much less disagreeable; for I might, if it did not sound conceited, contend that every one of the detached statements which constitute the Upanishads, may be deduced as a necessary result from the fundamental thoughts which I have to enunciate, though those deductions themselves are by no means to be found there.

Schopenhauer was first introduced to Anquetil du Perron's translation by Friedrich Majer in 1814. They met during the winter of 1813–1814 in Weimar at the home of Schopenhauer's mother, according to the biographer Safranski. Majer was a follower of Herder, and an early Indologist. Schopenhauer did not begin serious study of the Indic texts until the summer of 1814. Safranski maintains that, between 1815 and 1817, Schopenhauer had another important cross-pollination with Indian thought in Dresden. This was through his neighbor of two years, Karl Christian Friedrich Krause. Krause was then a minor and rather unorthodox philosopher who attempted to mix his own ideas with ancient Indian wisdom. Krause had also mastered Sanskrit, unlike Schopenhauer, and they developed a professional relationship. It was from Krause that Schopenhauer learned meditation and received the closest thing to expert advice concerning Indian thought.

The view of things [...] that all plurality is only apparent, that in the endless series of individuals, passing simultaneously and successively into and out of life, generation after generation, age after age, there is but one and the same entity really existing, which is present and identical in all alike;—this theory, I say, was of course known long before Kant; indeed, it may be carried back to the remotest antiquity. It is the alpha and omega of the oldest book in the world, the sacred Vedas, whose dogmatic part, or rather esoteric teaching, is found in the Upanishads. There, in almost every page this profound doctrine lies enshrined; with tireless repetition, in countless adaptations, by many varied parables and similes it is expounded and inculcated.

— On the Basis of Morality, chapter 4

For Schopenhauer, will had ontological primacy over the intellect; desire is prior to thought. Schopenhauer felt this was similar to notions of puruṣārtha or goals of life in Vedānta Hinduism.

In Schopenhauer's philosophy, denial of the will is attained by:

- personal experience of an extremely great suffering that leads to loss of the will to live; or
- knowledge of the essential nature of life in the world through observation of the suffering of other people.

The book Oupnekhat (Upanishad) always lay open on his table, and he invariably studied it before going to bed. He called the opening up of Sanskrit literature "the greatest gift of our century", and predicted that the philosophy and knowledge of the Upanishads would become the cherished faith of the West. Most noticeable, in the case of Schopenhauer's work, was the significance of the Chandogya Upanishad, whose Mahāvākya, Tat Tvam Asi, is mentioned throughout The World as Will and Representation.

==== Buddhism ====
Schopenhauer noted a correspondence between his doctrines and the Four Noble Truths of Buddhism. Similarities centered on the principles that life involves suffering, that suffering is caused by desire (taṇhā), and that the extinction of desire leads to liberation. Thus three of the four "truths of the Buddha" correspond to Schopenhauer's doctrine of the will. In Buddhism, while greed and lust are always unskillful, desire is ethically variable – it can be skillful, unskillful, or neutral.

Buddhist nirvāṇa is not equivalent to the condition that Schopenhauer described as denial of the will. Nirvāṇa is not the extinguishing of the person as some Western scholars have thought, but only the "extinguishing" (the literal meaning of nirvana) of the flames of greed, hatred, and delusion that assail a person's character. Schopenhauer made the following statement in his discussion of religions:

If I wished to take the results of my philosophy as the standard of truth, I should have to concede to Buddhism pre-eminence over the others. In any case, it must be a pleasure to me to see my doctrine in such close agreement with a religion that the majority of men on earth hold as their own, for this numbers far more followers than any other. And this agreement must be yet the more pleasing to me, inasmuch as in my philosophizing I have certainly not been under its influence [emphasis added]. For up till 1818, when my work appeared, there was to be found in Europe only a very few accounts of Buddhism.

Buddhist philosopher Keiji Nishitani sought to distance Buddhism from Schopenhauer. While Schopenhauer's philosophy may sound rather mystical in such a summary, his methodology was resolutely empirical, rather than speculative or transcendental:

Philosophy ... is a science, and as such has no articles of faith; accordingly, in it nothing can be assumed as existing except what is either positively given empirically, or demonstrated through indubitable conclusions.

Also note:

This actual world of what is knowable, in which we are and which is in us, remains both the material and the limit of our consideration.

The argument that Buddhism affected Schopenhauer's philosophy more than any other Dharmic faith loses credence since he did not begin a serious study of Buddhism until after the publication of The World as Will and Representation in 1818. Scholars have started to revise earlier views about Schopenhauer's discovery of Buddhism. Proof of early interest and influence appears in Schopenhauer's 1815–16 notes (transcribed and translated by Urs App) about Buddhism. They are included in a recent case study that traces Schopenhauer's interest in Buddhism and documents its influence. Other scholarly work questions how similar Schopenhauer's philosophy actually is to Buddhism.

==== Magic and occultism ====
Some traditions in Western esotericism and parapsychology interested Schopenhauer and influenced his philosophical theories. He praised animal magnetism as evidence for the reality of magic in his On the Will in Nature, and went so far as to accept the division of magic into left-hand and right-hand magic, although he doubted the existence of demons.

Schopenhauer grounded magic in the Will and claimed all forms of magical transformation depended on the human Will, not on ritual. This theory notably parallels Aleister Crowley's system of magic and its emphasis on human will. Given the importance of the Will to Schopenhauer's overarching system, this amounts to "suggesting his whole philosophical system had magical powers." Schopenhauer rejected the theory of disenchantment and claimed philosophy should synthesize itself with magic, which he believed amount to "practical metaphysics".

Neoplatonism, including the traditions of Plotinus and to a lesser extent Marsilio Ficino, has also been cited as an influence on Schopenhauer.

=== Thoughts on other philosophers ===
==== Giordano Bruno and Spinoza ====
Schopenhauer saw Giordano Bruno and Spinoza as philosophers not bound to their age or nation. "Both were fulfilled by the thought, that as manifold the appearances of the world may be, it is still one being, that appears in all of them. ... Consequently, there is no place for God as creator of the world in their philosophy, but God is the world itself."

Schopenhauer expressed regret that Spinoza stuck, for the presentation of his philosophy, with the concepts of scholasticism and Cartesian philosophy, and tried to use geometrical proofs that do not hold because of vague and overly broad definitions. Bruno on the other hand, who knew much about nature and ancient literature, presented his ideas with Italian vividness, and is amongst philosophers the only one who comes near Plato's poetic and dramatic power of exposition.

Schopenhauer noted that their philosophies do not provide any ethics, and it is therefore very remarkable that Spinoza called his main work Ethics. In fact, it could be considered complete from the standpoint of life-affirmation, if one completely ignores morality and self-denial. It is yet even more remarkable that Schopenhauer mentions Spinoza as an example of the denial of the will, if one uses the French biography by Jean Maximilien Lucas as the key to Tractatus de Intellectus Emendatione.

==== Immanuel Kant ====
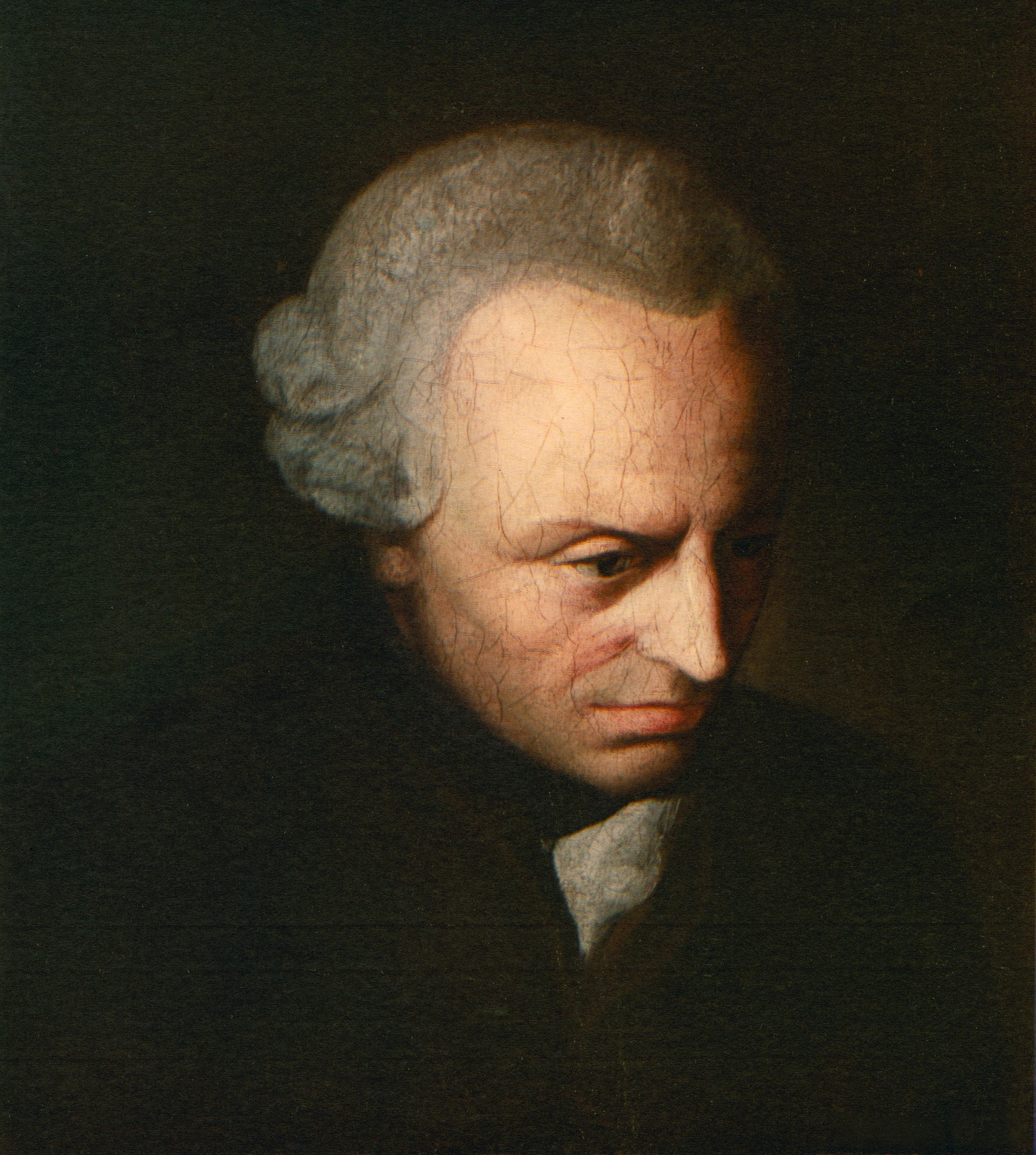
Schopenhauer's philosophy took Kant's work as its foundation. While he praised Kant's greatness, he nonetheless included a highly detailed criticism of Kantian philosophy as an appendix to The World as Will and Representation.

Kant's influence on Schopenhauer's development, personally as well as in philosophy, was extensive. Kant's philosophy lies at the foundation of Schopenhauer's, and he had high praise for the Transcendental Aesthetic section of Kant's Critique of Pure Reason. Schopenhauer maintained that Kant stands in the same relation to philosophers such as Berkeley and Plato, as Copernicus to Hicetas, Philolaus, and Aristarchus of Samos: Kant succeeded in demonstrating what previous philosophers merely asserted.

Schopenhauer writes about Kant's influence on his work in the preface to the second edition of The World as Will and Representation:

I have already explained in the preface to the first edition, that my philosophy is founded on that of Kant, and therefore presupposes a thorough knowledge of it. I repeat this here. For Kant's teaching produces in the mind of everyone who has comprehended it a fundamental change which is so great that it may be regarded as an intellectual new-birth. It alone is able really to remove the inborn realism which proceeds from the original character of the intellect, which neither Berkeley nor Malebranche succeed in doing, for they remain too much in the universal, while Kant goes into the particular, and indeed in a way that is quite unexampled both before and after him, and which has quite a peculiar, and, we might say, immediate effect upon the mind in consequence of which it undergoes a complete undeception, and forthwith looks at all things in another light. Only in this way can any one become susceptible to the more positive expositions which I have to give. On the other hand, he who has not mastered the Kantian philosophy, whatever else he may have studied, is, as it were, in a state of innocence; that is to say, he remains in the grasp of that natural and childish realism in which we are all born, and which fits us for everything possible, with the single exception of philosophy.

In his study room, one bust was of Buddha, the other was of Kant. The bond that Schopenhauer felt with the philosopher is demonstrated in an unfinished poem he dedicated to Kant (included in volume 2 of the Parerga):

With my eyes I followed thee into the blue sky,
And there thy flight dissolved from view.
Alone I stayed in the crowd below,
Thy word and thy book my only solace.—
Through the strains of thy inspiring words
I sought to dispel the dreary solitude.
Strangers on all sides surround me.
The world is desolate and life interminable.

Schopenhauer dedicated one fifth of his main work, The World as Will and Representation, to a detailed criticism of the Kantian philosophy.

Schopenhauer praised Kant for his distinction between appearance and the thing-in-itself, whereas the general consensus in German idealism was that this was the weakest spot of Kant's theory, since, according to Kant, causality can find application on objects of experience only, and consequently, things-in-themselves cannot be the cause of appearances. The inadmissibility of this reasoning was also acknowledged by Schopenhauer. He insisted that this was a true conclusion, drawn from false premises.

==== Post-Kantian school ====
The leading figures of post-Kantian philosophy—Johann Gottlieb Fichte, Schelling and Hegel—were not respected by Schopenhauer. He argued that they were not philosophers at all, for they lacked "the first requirement of a philosopher, namely a seriousness and honesty of inquiry." Rather, they were merely sophists who, excelling in the art of beguiling the public, pursued their own selfish interests (such as professional advancement within the university system). Diatribes against the alleged vacuity, dishonesty, pomposity, and self-interest of these contemporaries are to be found throughout Schopenhauer's published writings. The following passage is an example:

All this explains the painful impression with which we are seized when, after studying genuine thinkers, we come to the writings of Fichte and Schelling, or even to the presumptuously scribbled nonsense of Hegel, produced as it was with a boundless, though justified, confidence in German stupidity. With those genuine thinkers one always found an honest investigation of truth and just as honest an attempt to communicate their ideas to others. Therefore whoever reads Kant, Locke, Hume, Malebranche, Spinoza, and Descartes feels elevated and agreeably impressed. This is produced through communion with a noble mind which has and awakens ideas and which thinks and sets one thinking. The reverse of all this takes place when we read the above-mentioned three German sophists. An unbiased reader, opening one of their books and then asking himself whether this is the tone of a thinker wanting to instruct or that of a charlatan wanting to impress, cannot be five minutes in any doubt; here everything breathes so much of dishonesty.

Schopenhauer deemed Schelling the most talented of the three and wrote that he would recommend his "elucidatory paraphrase of the highly important doctrine of Kant" concerning the intelligible character, if he had been honest enough to admit he was parroting Kant, instead of hiding this relation in a cunning manner.

Schopenhauer reserved his most unqualified damning condemnation for Hegel, whom he considered less worthy than Fichte or Schelling. Whereas Fichte was merely a windbag (Windbeutel), Hegel was a "commonplace, inane, loathsome, repulsive, and ignorant charlatan." The philosophers Karl Popper and Mario Bunge agreed with this distinction. Hegel, Schopenhauer wrote in the preface to his Two Fundamental Problems of Ethics, not only "performed no service to philosophy, but he has had a detrimental influence on philosophy, and thereby on German literature in general, really a downright stupefying, or we could even say a pestilential influence, which it is therefore the duty of everyone capable of thinking for himself and judging for himself to counteract in the most express terms at every opportunity."

== Psychology ==
Philosophers have not traditionally been impressed by the necessity of sex, but Schopenhauer addressed sex and related concepts forthrightly:

... one ought rather to be surprised that a thing [sex] which plays throughout so important a part in human life has hitherto practically been disregarded by philosophers altogether, and lies before us as raw and untreated material.

He named a force within man that he felt took invariable precedence over reason: the will to live or will to life (Wille zum Leben), defined as an inherent drive within human beings, and all creatures, to stay alive; a force that inveigles us into reproducing.

Schopenhauer refused to conceive of love as either trifling or accidental, but rather understood it as an immensely powerful force that lay unseen within man's psyche, guaranteeing the quality of the human race:

The ultimate aim of all love affairs ... is more important than all other aims in man's life; and therefore it is quite worthy of the profound seriousness with which everyone pursues it. What is decided by it is nothing less than the composition of the next generation ...

It has often been argued that Schopenhauer's thoughts on sexuality foreshadowed the theory of evolution, a claim met with satisfaction by Darwin as he included a quotation from Schopenhauer in his Descent of Man. This has also been noted with respect to Freud's concepts of the libido and the unconscious mind, and evolutionary psychology in general.

== Influence and legacy ==
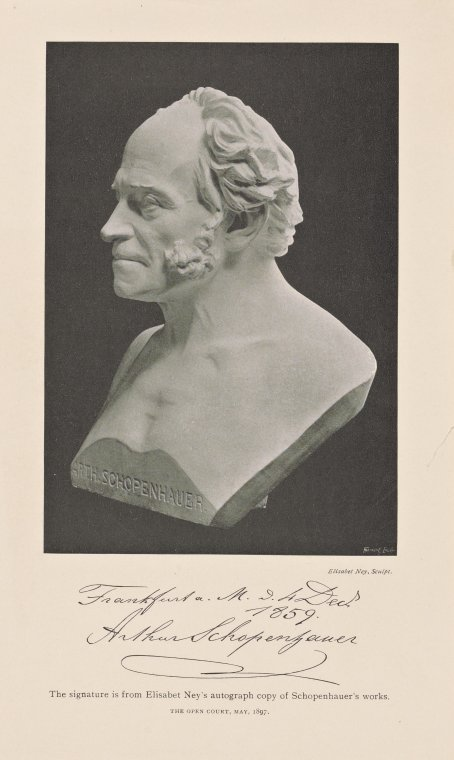
Sculpture of Schopenhauer by Elisabeth Ney

Schopenhauer remained the most influential German philosopher until the First World War. His philosophy was a starting point for a new generation of philosophers including Julius Bahnsen, Paul Deussen, Lazar von Hellenbach, Karl Robert Eduard von Hartmann, Ernst Otto Lindner, Philipp Mainländer, Friedrich Nietzsche, Olga Plümacher and Agnes Taubert. His legacy shaped the intellectual debate, and forced movements that were utterly opposed to him, neo-Kantianism and positivism, to address issues they would otherwise have completely ignored, and in doing so he changed them markedly. The French writer Guy de Maupassant commented that "to-day even those who execrate him seem to carry in their own souls particles of his thought". Other philosophers of the 19th century who cited his influence include Hans Vaihinger, Johannes Volkelt, Vladimir Solovyov and Otto Weininger.

Schopenhauer was well read by physicists, most notably Albert Einstein, Erwin Schrödinger, Wolfgang Pauli and Ettore Majorana. Einstein described Schopenhauer's thoughts as a "continual consolation" and called him a genius. In his Berlin study three figures hung on the wall: Michael Faraday, James Clerk Maxwell and Schopenhauer. Konrad Wachsmann recalled: "He often sat with one of the well-worn Schopenhauer volumes, and as he sat there, he seemed so pleased, as if he were engaged with a serene and cheerful work."

When Schrödinger discovered Schopenhauer ("the greatest savant of the West") he considered switching his study of physics to philosophy. He maintained the idealistic views during the rest of his life. Pauli accepted the main tenet of Schopenhauer's metaphysics, that the thing-in-itself is will.

But most of all Schopenhauer is famous for his influence on artists. Richard Wagner became one of the earliest and most famous adherents of the Schopenhauerian philosophy. The admiration was not mutual, and Schopenhauer proclaimed: "I remain faithful to Rossini and Mozart!" So he has been nicknamed "the artist's philosopher". See also Influence of Schopenhauer on Tristan und Isolde.

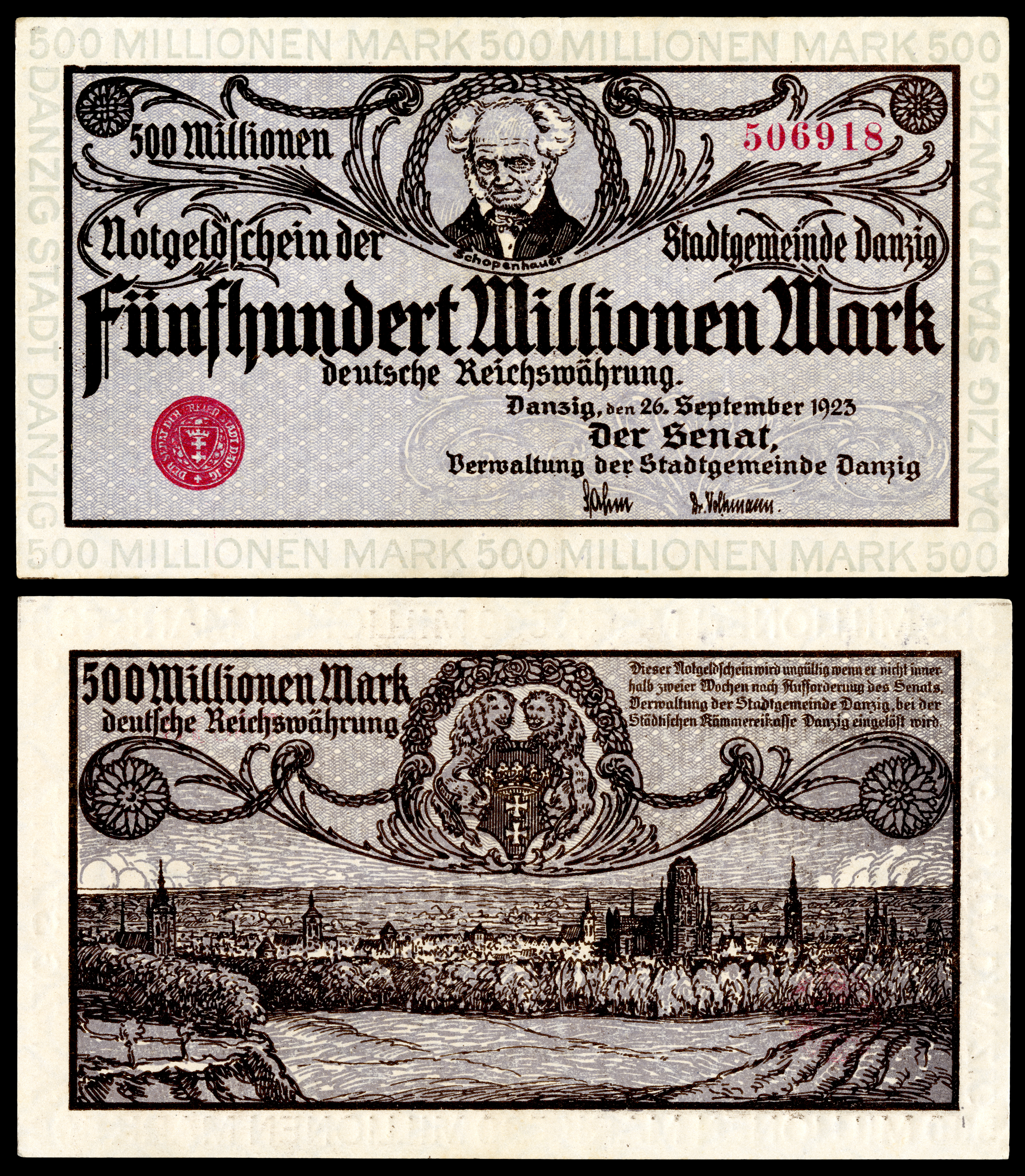
Schopenhauer depicted on a 500 million Danzig papiermark note (1923)

Under the influence of Schopenhauer, Leo Tolstoy became convinced that the truth of all religions lies in self-renunciation. When he read Schopenhauer's philosophy, Tolstoy exclaimed "at present I am convinced that Schopenhauer is the greatest genius among men. ... It is the whole world in an incomparably beautiful and clear reflection." He said that what he has written in War and Peace is also said by Schopenhauer in The World as Will and Representation.

Jorge Luis Borges remarked that the reason he had never attempted to write a systematic account of his world view, despite his penchant for philosophy and metaphysics in particular, was because Schopenhauer had already written it for him.

Other figures in literature who were strongly influenced by Schopenhauer were Thomas Mann, Thomas Hardy, Afanasy Fet, J.-K. Huysmans and George Santayana. In Herman Melville's final years, while he wrote Billy Budd, he read Schopenhauer's essays and marked them heavily. Scholar Brian Yothers notes that Melville "marked numerous misanthropic and even suicidal remarks, suggesting an attraction to the most extreme sorts of solitude, but he also made note of Schopenhauer's reflection on the moral ambiguities of genius." Schopenhauer's attraction to and discussions of both Eastern and Western religions in conjunction with each other made an impression on Melville in his final years.

Sergei Prokofiev, although initially reluctant to engage with works noted for their pessimism, became fascinated with Schopenhauer after reading Aphorisms on the Wisdom of Life in Parerga and Paralipomena. "With his truths Schopenhauer gave me a spiritual world and an awareness of happiness."

Nietzsche owed the awakening of his philosophical interest to reading The World as Will and Representation and admitted that he was one of the few philosophers that he respected, dedicating to him his essay "Schopenhauer als Erzieher", one of his Untimely Meditations.

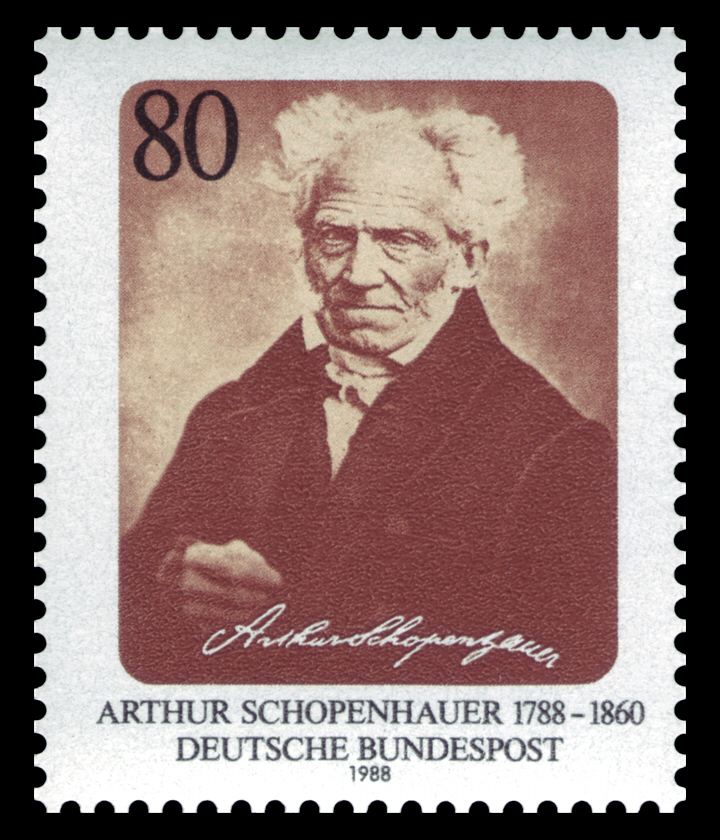
Commemorative stamp of the Deutsche Bundespost, 1988

Early in his career, Ludwig Wittgenstein adopted Schopenhauer's epistemological idealism, and some traits of Schopenhauer's influence (particularly Schopenhauerian transcendentalism) can be observed in the Tractatus Logico-Philosophicus. Later on, Wittgenstein rejected epistemological transcendental idealism for Gottlob Frege's conceptual realism. In later years, Wittgenstein became highly dismissive of Schopenhauer, describing him as an ultimately shallow thinker. His friend Bertrand Russell had a low opinion on the philosopher, and even came to attack him in his History of Western Philosophy for hypocritically praising asceticism yet not acting upon it.

Opposite to Russell on the foundations of mathematics, the Dutch mathematician L. E. J. Brouwer incorporated Kant's and Schopenhauer's ideas in the philosophical school of intuitionism, where mathematics is considered as a purely mental activity instead of an analytic activity wherein objective properties of reality are revealed. Brouwer was also influenced by Schopenhauer's metaphysics, and wrote an essay on mysticism.

Schopenhauer's philosophy features in the novel The Schopenhauer Cure, by American existential psychiatrist and emeritus professor of psychiatry Irvin Yalom.

Schopenhauer's philosophy, and the discussions on philosophical pessimism it has engendered, has been the focus of contemporary thinkers such as David Benatar, Thomas Ligotti, and Eugene Thacker. Their work also served as an inspiration for the popular HBO TV series True Detective as well as Life Is Beautiful. In this regard, Schopenhauer is sometimes considered the founding father of today's antinatalism.

Advocates of idealism in contemporary analytic philosophy and neuroscience such as Bernardo Kastrup and Christof Koch owe their philosophical system, in part, to the metaphysics of Schopenhauer.

== Selected bibliography ==
- On the Fourfold Root of the Principle of Sufficient Reason (Ueber die vierfache Wurzel des Satzes vom zureichenden Grunde), 1813 (revised and enlarged: 1847)
- On Vision and Colours (Ueber das Sehn und die Farben), 1816 ISBN 978-0-85496-988-3 (revised and enlarged: 1854)
- Theory of Colours (Theoria colorum physiologica), 1830
- The World as Will and Representation (alternatively translated as The World as Will and Idea; original German is Die Welt als Wille und Vorstellung): vol. 1, 1818–1819, vol. 2, 1844 Världen som vilja och föreställning (2nd edition: 1844, 3rd edition: 1859)
  - Vol. 1 Dover edition 1966, ISBN 978-0-486-21761-1. Translated by E. F. J. Payne.
  - Vol. 2 Dover edition 1966, ISBN 978-0-486-21762-8. Translated by E. F. J. Payne.
  - Peter Smith Publisher hardcover set 1969, ISBN 978-0-8446-2885-1
  - Everyman Paperback combined abridged edition (290 pp.) ISBN 978-0-460-87505-9
  - The Longman Library of Primary Sources in Philosophy, vol. 1, 2008; vol. 2, 2010. Title translated as The World as Will and Presentation, rather than Representation. Translated by Richard E. Aquila and David Carus.
  - Cambridge University Press. Volume 1 (2010), ISBN 978-0-521-87184-6. Volume 2 (2018). Translated by Judith Norman, Alistair Welchman, and Christopher Janaway.
- The Art of Being Right (Eristische Dialektik: Die Kunst, Recht zu Behalten), 1831
- On the Will in Nature (Ueber den Willen in der Natur), 1836 ISBN 978-0-85496-999-9 (revised and enlarged: 1854)
- On the Freedom of the Will (Ueber die Freiheit des menschlichen Willens), 1838 ISBN 978-0-631-14552-3
- On the Basis of Morality (Ueber die Grundlage der Moral), 1839
- Schopenhauer, Arthur (2010). The Two Fundamental Problems of Ethics. Translated by Cartwright, David E.; Erdmann, Edward E. London: Oxford University Press. ISBN 9780199297221. 1841 (revised and enlarged: 1860) Contains On the Freedom of the Will and On the Basis of Morality.
- Schopenhauer, Arthur (September 1840) [Stated date: 1841.]. Die beiden Grundprobleme der Ethik, behandelt in zwei akademischen Preisschriften (in German). Frankfurt am Main: Johann Christian Hermannsche Buchandlung. Freely available from Internet Archive. Contains Preisschrift über die Freiheit des Willens and Preisschrift über die Grundlage der Moral.
- Parerga and Paralipomena (2 vols., 1851) – Reprint: (Oxford: Clarendon Press) (2 vols., 1974) (English translation by E. F. J. Payne)
  - Printings:
    - 1974 Hardcover, by ISBN
      - Vols. 1 and 2, ISBN 978-0-19-519813-3,
      - Vol. 1, ISBN
      - Vol. 2, ISBN 978-0-19-824527-8,
    - 1974–1980 Paperback, Vol. 1, ISBN 978-0-19-824634-3, Vol. 2, ISBN 978-0-19-824635-0,
    - 2001 Paperback, Vol. 1, ISBN 978-0-19-924220-7, Vol. 2, ISBN 978-0-19-924221-4
  - Essays and Aphorisms, being excerpts from Volume 2 of Parerga und Paralipomena, selected and translated by R. J. Hollingdale, with Introduction by R J Hollingdale, Penguin Classics, 1970, Paperback 1973: ISBN 978-0-14-044227-4
- An Enquiry concerning Ghost-seeing, and what is connected therewith (Versuch über das Geistersehn und was damit zusammenhangt), 1851
- Manuscript Remains, (6 Volumes), Volume 2 published by Berg Publishers Ltd., ISBN 978-0-85496-539-7

=== Online ===
- Works by Arthur Schopenhauer at Project Gutenberg
- The Art of Controversy (Die Kunst, Recht zu behalten) . (bilingual) [The Art of Being Right]
- Studies in Pessimism – audiobook from LibriVox
- The World as Will and Idea at the Internet Archive:
  - Volume I
  - Volume II
  - Volume III
- "On the fourfold root of the principle of sufficient reason" and "On the will in nature". Two essays:
  - Internet Archive. Translated by Mrs. Karl Hillebrand (1903).
  - Cornell University Library Historical Monographs Collection. Reprinted by Cornell University Library Digital Collections
- Facsimile edition of Schopenhauer's manuscripts in SchopenhauerSource
- Essays of Schopenhauer

== See also ==
- Antinatalism
- Existential nihilism
- Eye of a needle
- Massacre of the Innocents (Guido Reni)
- Mortal coil
- Nihilism
- Post-Schopenhauerian pessimism
