= Ludwig Sigismund Ruhl =

German painter

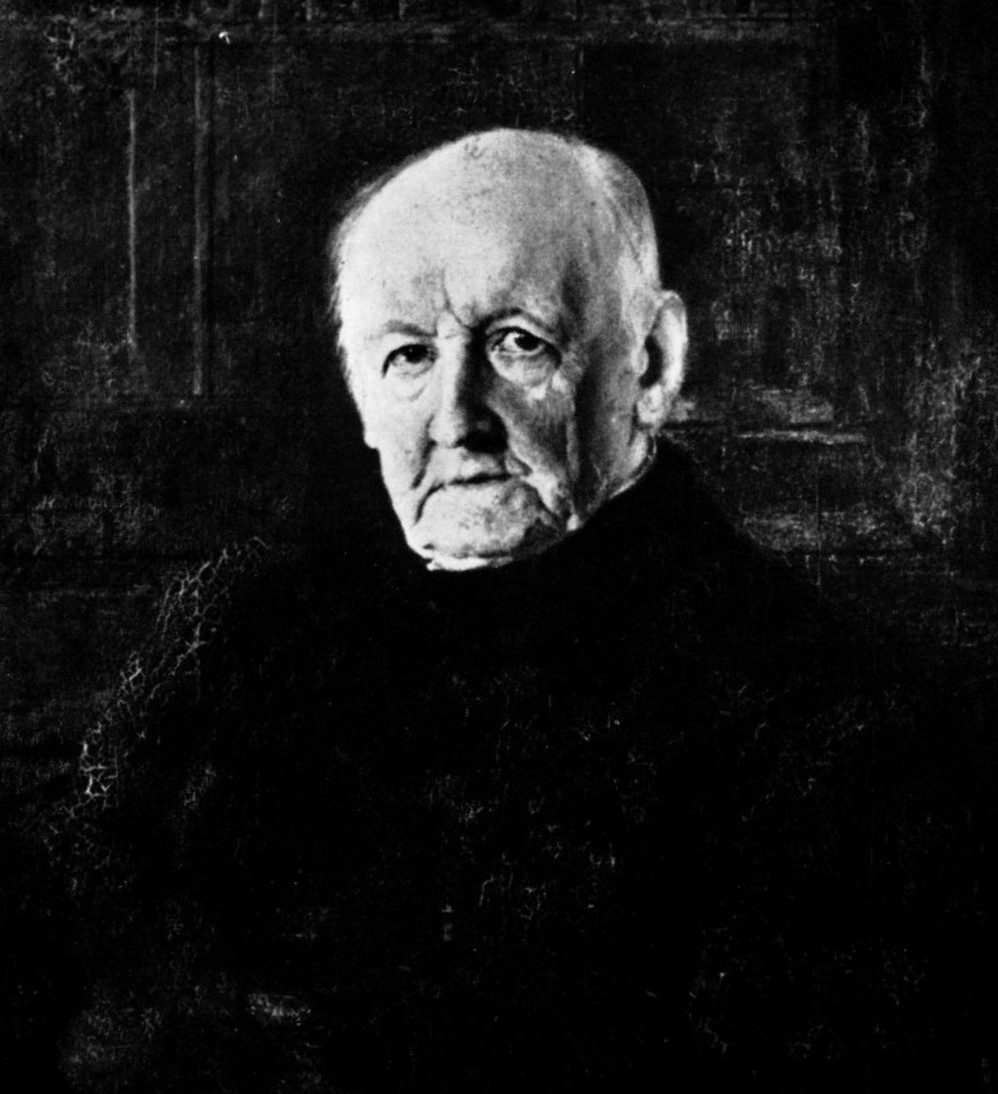
Photograph of him in old age

Ludwig Sigismund Ruhl (10 December 1794–7 March 1887) was a German painter and engraver.

== Biography ==
Ludwig Sigismund Ruhl was born on 10 December 1794, in Kassel, Hessen, Germany, to include his immediate family, comprehending him as the son-father of Johann Christian Ruhl (1764–1842) and son-mother of Elisabeth Ruhl (Voelkel) (1772–1833). He is the brother of Eugen Julius Ruhl and husband of Sophie Ruhl.

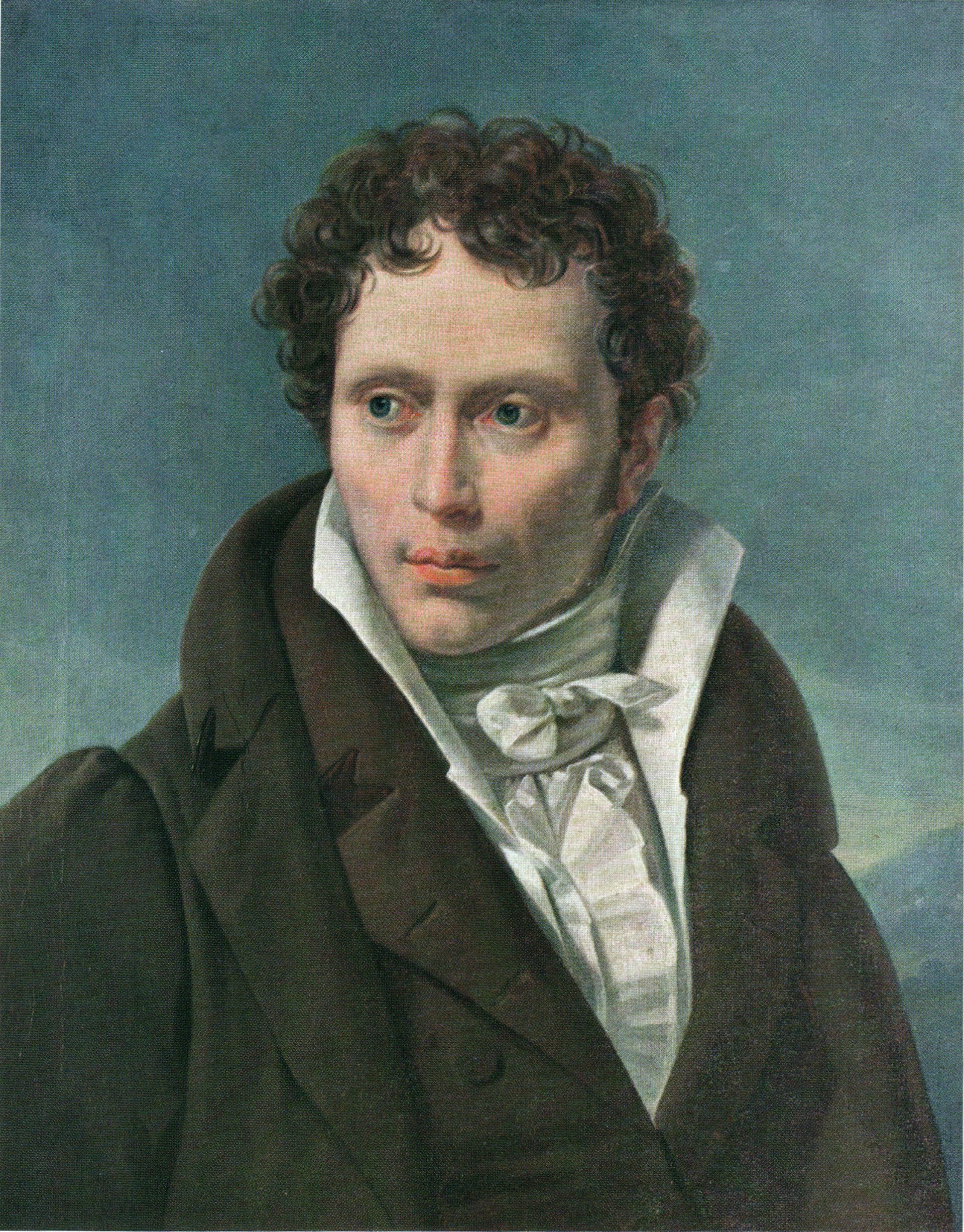
Portrait of Arthur Schopenhauer, 1815

He received his first drawing lessons from his sculptor father, and while at young age, attended the Academy of Fine Arts in Kassel, where he met the painter Ludwig Emil Grimm. He studied aesthetics, as well as art history in Göttingen, and later at the Dresden Academy, where he made acquaintances with philosopher Arthur Schopenhauer, portraying him in an 1815 portrait.

He then attended the art academy in Munich, where he started a relationship with landscape painter Karl Philipp Fohr following a sojourn in Rome. There he was inspired by the Renaissance masters, going on to paint in the style of the Nazarene school.

He died on 7 March 1887.

== Sources ==
- LAGIS Hessian Biography Ludwig Sigismund Ruhl (in German and English)
- Ludwig Sigismund Ruhl short biographical
