= Rudolf Seydel =

German philosopher and theologian

Rudolf Seydel (May 27, 1835 – December 8, 1892) was a German philosopher and theologian born in Dresden.

In 1860 he received his habilitation at the University of Leipzig, where in 1867 he became an associate professor of philosophy. He was a disciple of Christian Hermann Weisse (1801–1866), and is remembered for his studies involving parallels between Buddhism and Christianity. Seydel died in Leipzig on December 8, 1892.

== Selected writings ==
- Schopenhauers philosophisches System (Schopenhauer's philosophical system), 1857.
- Logik oder Wissenschaft vom Wissen (Logic or science of wisdom), 1866.
- Die Religion der Religionen (The religion of religions), 1872.
- Ethik oder Wissenschaft vom Seinsollenden (Ethic or science of the Seinsollenden), 1874.
- Das Evangelium von Jesu in seinem Verhältnis zur Buddhasage und Buddhlehre (The Gospel of Jesus in relation to the Buddha legend and teachings), 1882.
- Die Buddhalegende und das Leben Jesu nach den Evangelien (The Buddha legend and the life of Jesus after the Gospels), 1884.
- Buddha und Christus (Buddha and Christ), 1884.
- Religion und Wissenschaft. Gesammelte Reden und Abhandlungen (Religion and science, Collection of Writings and Papers), 1887.
- Religionsphilosophie im Umriß (Philosophy of religion in outline); (edited by Paul Wilhelm Schmiedel 1893).
