= On the Basis of Morality =

1840 German-language essay by Schopenhauer

On the Basis of Morality or On the Basis of Morals (German: Ueber die Grundlage der Moral, 1839) is one of Arthur Schopenhauer's major works in ethics, in which he argues that morality stems from compassion. Schopenhauer begins with a criticism of Kant's Groundwork of the Metaphysics of Morals, which Schopenhauer considered to be the clearest explanation of Kant's foundation of ethics.

== Publication history ==
On the Basis of Morality was written for an essay contest of the Royal Danish Society and submitted in 1839 with the original title On the Foundation of Morals (Ueber das Fundament der Moral). Unlike Schopenhauer’s other essay on ethics, On the Freedom of the Will, which had been crowned by a Norwegian academy, this essay was not awarded a prize despite being the only response which the academy had received. In the essay, Schopenhauer had made a disparaging remark about Hegel, and a Hegelian; “Mr. Feuerbach, a Hegelian (c’est tout dire [that says it all])”. The judge of the prize competition, however, was an author of a Hegelian theory of morals.

The piece was republished under the title Prize Essay on the Basis of Morals (German: Preisschrift über die Grundlage der Moral), along with On the Freedom of the Will, in The Two Fundamental Problems of Ethics (German: Die beiden Grundprobleme der Ethik) in September 1840, with an 1841 publication date.

=== Reaction on Hegel's philosophy ===
After this incident, Schopenhauer took the opportunity to demonstrate that Hegel’s writings are, as he says, “a pseudo-philosophy that cripples all mental powers, suffocates real thinking and substitutes by means of the most outrageous use of language the hollowest, the most devoid of sense, the most thoughtless, and, as the outcome confirms, the most stupefying jumble of words”, a claim which he normally considered too self-evident for support of arguments.

Schopenhauer took as an example (“out of the rich selection of absurdities”) that Hegel believed that mass could become heavier after being magnetized:

An example of the existent specification of gravity is furnished by the following phenomenon: when a bar of iron, evenly balanced on its fulcrum, is magnetized, it loses its equilibrium and shows itself to be heavier at one pole than at the other. Here the one part is so affected that without changing its volume it becomes heavier; the matter, without increase in its mass, has thus become specifically heavier.

— Hegel

Schopenhauer comments that Hegel not only lacked basic knowledge of physics, but that the “reformer of logic” also did not understand logic: “For, put in categorical form, the Hegelian syllogism reads: ‘Everything that becomes heavier on one side falls to that side; this magnetized bar falls to one side: therefore it has become heavier in that place.’ A worthy analogue to the inference: ‘All geese have two legs, you have two legs, therefore you are a goose.’”

Two other examples are also discussed. To prevent “the way out of saying that the high doctrines of that wisdom are unattainable by lower intelligences, and that what appears as nonsense to me is bottomless profundity”, Schopenhauer wanted to show that Hegel simply wrote nonsense by using concrete examples. Schopenhauer believed that Hegel could only have gained acceptance as a serious thinker because people do not judge with their own intellect, but instead accept the authority of others, especially of academies.

== Structure ==
On the Basis of Morality is divided into four sections. The first section is an introduction in which Schopenhauer provides his account of the question posed by the Royal Danish Society and his interpretation of the history of western ethics. In the second section, Schopenhauer embarks on a criticism of Kant's foundation of ethics. The third section of the work is Schopenhauer's positive construction of his own ethical theory. The final section of the work provides a brief description of the metaphysical foundations of ethics.

== Morality's foundation ==
Religions have promised a reward after death if a person behaved well. Governmental laws are motives for good behavior because they promise earthly rewards and punishments. Kant's Categorical imperative claimed that a person's own behavior should be in accordance with a universal law. All of these, however, are ultimately founded on selfish egoism. "If an action has as its motive an egoistic aim," wrote Schopenhauer, "it cannot have any moral worth." Schopenhauer's doctrine was that morality is based on "the everyday phenomenon of compassion,...the immediate participation, independent of all ulterior considerations, primarily in the suffering of another, and thus in the prevention or elimination of it.... Only insofar as an action has sprung from compassion does it have moral value; and every action resulting from any other motives has none." Compassion is not egoistic because the compassionate person does not feel different from the suffering person or animal that is seen. Even though the sufferer is experienced as an external being, "I nevertheless feel it with him, feel it as my own, and not within me, but in another person... But this presupposes that to a certain extent I have identified myself with the other man, and in consequence the barrier between the ego and the non–ego is for the moment abolished...." Schopenhauer thus considered it to be true that "compassion, as the sole non–egoistic motive, is also the only genuinely moral one."

== Kant's merit ==
Schopenhauer declared that the true basis of morality is compassion or sympathy. The morality of an action can be judged in accordance with Kant's distinction of treating a person as an end not as a mere means. By drawing the distinction between egoism and unselfishness, Kant correctly described the criterion of morality. For Schopenhauer, this was the only merit of Kant's Groundwork of the Metaphysics of Morals.

== Reception ==
According to Schrödinger, Schopenhauer had solved one of the two fundamental problems of ethics: "But let me say once more: I was not trying to show forth the motives that lead to ethical action, here to exhibit a new ‘foundation for morality’. Schopenhauer, we know, did that, and it is scarcely likely that in this direction there will be anything essential as yet to add to what he said."
