= On the Freedom of the Will =

1839 German-language essay by Schopenhauer

On the Freedom of the Will

On the Freedom of the Will (German: Ueber die Freiheit des Willens) is an essay presented to the Royal Norwegian Society of Sciences in 1838 by Arthur Schopenhauer as a response to the academic question that they had posed: "Is it possible to demonstrate human free will from self-consciousness?" It is one of the constituent essays of his work Die beiden Grundprobleme der Ethik (The Two Basic Problems of Ethics).

Essentially, Schopenhauer claimed that as phenomenal objects appearing to a viewer, humans have absolutely no free will. They are completely determined by the way that their bodies react to stimuli and causes, and their characters react to motives. As things that exist apart from being appearances to observers (noumenon), however, human life can be explained as following from the freedom of will (though not in a way satisfying Christian and other theology, as he says in other works).

== Publication history ==
On the Freedom of the Will was written for an essay contest of the Royal Norwegian Society of Sciences and submitted in 1838 with the original title On the Freedom of the Human Will (German: Ueber die Freiheit des menschlichen Willens). It was awarded the prize on 26 January 1839.

The piece was republished under the title Prize Essay on the Freedom of the Will (German: Preisschrift über die Freiheit des Willens), along with On the Basis of Morals, in The Two Fundamental Problems of Ethics (German: Die beiden Grundprobleme der Ethik) in September 1840, with an 1841 publication date.

== Summary ==
Schopenhauer began by analyzing the basic concepts of freedom and self-consciousness. He asserted that there are three types of freedom; physical, intellectual, and moral (the terms were sometimes used in philosophy, as he shows in chapter four).

- Physical freedom is the absence of physical obstacles to actions. This negative approach can also be expressed positively: only he is free who acts according to one's will and nothing else. (This is commonly thought to constitute freedom of the will.) But when this simple meaning is used in connection with the will itself and the answer "will is free" is assumed—like with the question "can you will what you willed to will?" (and so on, because then one can always ask for the source of "willing to will" and whether it was free)—one eventually commits an error of infinite regress, because one always seeks an earlier will which the current one adheres to. Also the verb "can", when understood physically in the above question, does not really solve the problem satisfactorily, so other meanings were sought.
- Intellectual freedom results when the mind has a clear knowledge of the abstract or concrete motives to action. This occurs when the mind is not affected by, for example, extreme passion or mind-altering substances.
- Moral freedom is the absence of any necessity in person's actions. As "necessary" means "that what follows from a given sufficient basis"—whereas, likewise, all sufficient bases act with necessity (because they are sufficient), and thus there is no possibility that a cause does not bring its effect—a will containing a free element (liberum arbitrium) and thus arising without necessity would imply the existence of something that has no cause whatsoever and is completely arbitrary and unaffected (liberum arbitrium indifferentiae, freedom of will not influenced by anything). This would be the undetermined part (whereas apart from that something could, possibly, still influence man).
- Self-consciousness is a person's awareness of their own willing, including emotions and passions.

In the course of the analysis Schopenhauer declares that the opposition of necessary is known as contingent or incidental, which is normally encountered in the real world as just relative contingency (a coincidence) of two events—of which both still have their causes and are necessary with regard to them. Two things are incidental, or contingent, to each other when one does not cause the other. He then derives the concept of absolute contingency by extending the former term so that no sufficient basis exists whatsoever; such thing would not be incidental with regard to something, but with regard to all and everything. He concludes that liberum arbitrium indifferentiae would mean exactly such incident (a chance), an absolutely fortuitous or random occurrence. He notes that with such liberum arbitrium indifferentiae one would be equally capable of doing one thing or the other.

According to Schopenhauer, when a person inspects their self-consciousness, they find the feeling "I can do whatever I will as long as I am not hindered." But, Schopenhauer claimed that this is merely physical freedom. He asserted "You can do what you will, but in any given moment of your life you can will only one definite thing and absolutely nothing other than that one thing." Therefore, the Royal Society's question has been answered "No."

On the other hand, when a person observes the external world, they find that any change in a thing was immediately preceded by a change in some other thing. This sequence is experienced as a necessary effect and its cause. Humans experience three types of causes.

- Cause in the narrowest sense of the word relates to mechanical, physical, and chemical changes in an inorganic object. Newton's laws of motion describe these changes.
- Stimulus is a change that produces a reaction in an organism that is devoid of knowledge, such as vegetation. It requires physical contact. The effect is related to the duration and intensity of the stimulus.
- Motivation is causality that passes through a knowing mind. The motive needs only to be perceived, no matter how long, how close, or how distinct it appears. For animals, the motive must be immediately present. Humans, however, can also respond to motives that are abstract concepts and mere thoughts. Therefore, humans are capable of deliberation in which a stronger abstract motive outweighs other motives and necessarily determines the will to act. This is a relative freedom in which humans are not determined by objects that are immediately present.

I can do what I will: I can, if I will, give everything I have to the poor and thus become poor myself—if I will! But I cannot will this, because the opposing motives have much too much power over me for me to be able to. On the other hand, if I had a different character, even to the extent that I were a saint, then I would be able to will it. But then I could not keep from willing it, and hence I would have to do so.

— Chapter III

[A]s little as a ball on a billiard table can move before receiving an impact, so little can a man get up from his chair before being drawn or driven by a motive. But then his getting up is as necessary and inevitable as the rolling of a ball after the impact. And to expect that anyone will do something to which absolutely no interest impels them is the same as to expect that a piece of wood shall move toward me without being pulled by a string.

— Ibid.

Every human has a unique way of reacting to motives. This is called a character. It is the nature of the individual will. Human character has four attributes.

- Individual – Like intellectual capacity, each person's character is different. Acts can't be predicted by knowledge of motives alone. Knowledge of individual character is also required in order to predict how a person will act.
- Empirical – The character of other people or oneself can only be known through experience. Only by seeing actual behavior in a situation can character be known.
- Constant – Character does not change. It remains the same throughout life. This is presupposed whenever a person is evaluated as a result of their past actions. Given the same circumstances, what was done once will be done again. Behavior, however, can change when a character learns how to attain its goal through a different way of acting. The means change, but not the ends. This is the result of improved cognition or education.
- Inborn – Characters are determined by nature, not by the environment. Two people who have been raised in exactly the same environment will exhibit different characters.

Virtue cannot be taught. The tendency toward good or evil is the result of inborn character.

Are two actions possible to a given person under given circumstances? No. Only one action is possible.

Since a person's character remains unchanged, if the circumstances of his life were unchanged, could his life have been different? No.

Everything that happens, happens necessarily. Denial of necessity leads one back to the idea of absolute randomness, which can hardly be thought of; the world without universal causation would be "randomness with no sense in it".

Through that which we do, we find out what we are.

To wish that some event had not taken place is a silly self-torture, for this means to wish something absolutely impossible.

It is an error to think that abstract motives do not have necessary effects because they are mere thoughts. This error results in the delusion that we can be conscious of having free will. In reality, the most powerful abstract motive necessarily determines concrete action.

[L]et us imagine a man who, while standing on the street, would say to himself: "It is six o'clock in the evening, the work day is over. Now I can go for a walk, or I can go to the club; I can also climb up the tower to see the sun set; I can go to the theater; I can visit this friend or that one; indeed, I also can run out of the gate, into the wide world, and never return. All of this is strictly up to me, in this I have complete freedom. But still I shall do none of these things now, but with just as free a will I shall go home to my wife."

— Chapter III

The fourth chapter deals with important predecessors of Schopenhauer in the topic. Amongst others, Thomas Hobbes is quoted, who shows that wherever one can speak of a necessary condition for a thing or an event (one they cannot happen without), that thing or event can be thought of as determined, occurring out of necessity, and having a well defined sufficient cause. That cause is precisely the sum of such necessary conditions; it does not lack anything which is necessary to bring its effect. (Theoretically, although Schopenhauer does not consider this, a specific realization of a random variable—like the mentioned liberum arbitrium indifferentiae—could perhaps still be amongst the set of conditions.) Christian writers and those of the Enlightenment are mentioned, as well as theodicy and the problem of evil.

After explaining how acts follow with strict necessity from a given character and its response to different motives, and after presenting various views of famous thinkers hitherto, Schopenhauer addressed the question of moral freedom and responsibility. Everyone has a feeling of the responsibility for what they do. They feel accountable for their actions. They are certain that they themselves have done their deeds. In order to have acted differently, a person would have had to be entirely different. Schopenhauer claimed that the necessity of our actions can coexist with the feeling of freedom and responsibility in a way that was explained by Kant. In his Critique of Pure Reason (A533–558) and Critique of Practical Reason (Ch. III), Kant explained this coexistence. When a person has a mental picture of himself as a phenomenon existing in the experienced world, his acts appear to be strictly determined by motives that affect his character. This is empirical necessity. But when that person feels his inner being as a thing-in-itself, not phenomenon, he feels free. According to Schopenhauer, this is because the inner being or thing-in-itself is called will. This word "will" designates the closest analogy to that which is felt as the inner being and essence of a person. When we feel our freedom, we are feeling our inner essence and being, which is a transcendentally free will. The will is free, but only in itself and other than as its appearance in an observer's mind. When it appears in an observer's mind, as the experienced world, the will does not appear free. But because of this transcendental freedom, as opposed to empirical necessity, every act and deed is a person's own responsibility. We have responsibility for our acts because what we are is a result of our inner essence and being, which is a transcendentally free will (its effects are the inborn characters of all people). We are what the transcendental will, which we are, has made us.

[M]an does at all times only what he wills, and yet he does this necessarily. But this is because he already is what he wills.

— Ch. V

== English translations ==
Some English editions publish the standalone essay, whereas others translate the The Two Fundamental Problems of Ethics in full.

- The Two Fundamental Problems of Ethics, trans. David E. Cartright and Edward E. Erdmann, with an introduction by Chrisopher Janaway. Oxford University Press, 2010 (Oxford World's Classics series).
- The Two Fundamental Problems of Ethics, trans. Christopher Janaway. Cambridge University Press, 2009 (The Cambrdige Edition of the Works of Schopenhauer)
- Prize Essay on the Freedom of the Will, trans. Eric F.J. Payne, ed. Günter Zöller. Cambrdige University Press, 1999 (Cambridge Texts in the History of Philosophy)
- Essay on the Freedom of the Will, translated with an introduction by Konstantin Kolenda. Bobbs-Merrill 1960.

== See also ==
- Nietzsche and free will
