= Jules Lunteschütz =

French-German portraitist

Jules Lunteschütz (February 9, 1821 – March 20, 1893) was a Franco-German portrait painter noted for his portrait of the philosopher Arthur Schopenhauer. He was also known by his given name, Isaak Lunteschütz.

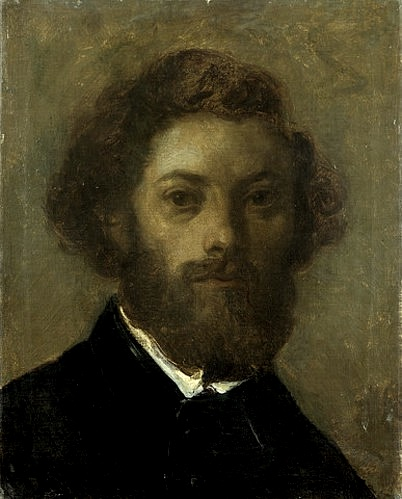
Portrait of Lunteschütz by Gustave Courbet (1858), Frankfurt, Städel.

== Biography ==
Lunteschütz was born on February 9, 1821, in Romanswiller and died on March 20, 1893, in Frankfurt. He studied drawing at the "École de dessin Besançon". In 1837 he studied painting under Philipp Veit in Frankfurt, and in 1838 he studied under Jean Alaux at the École des Beaux-Arts in Paris. He exhibited at the Paris Salon from 1851 to 1867 and was made Chevalier of the Legion of Honour in 1866.

He is best known for his portrait of his friend, the philosopher Arthur Schopenhauer. Gustave Courbet has painted a portrait of Lunteschütz in 1858, which can be found at the Städel art museum in Frankfurt.

== Gallery ==
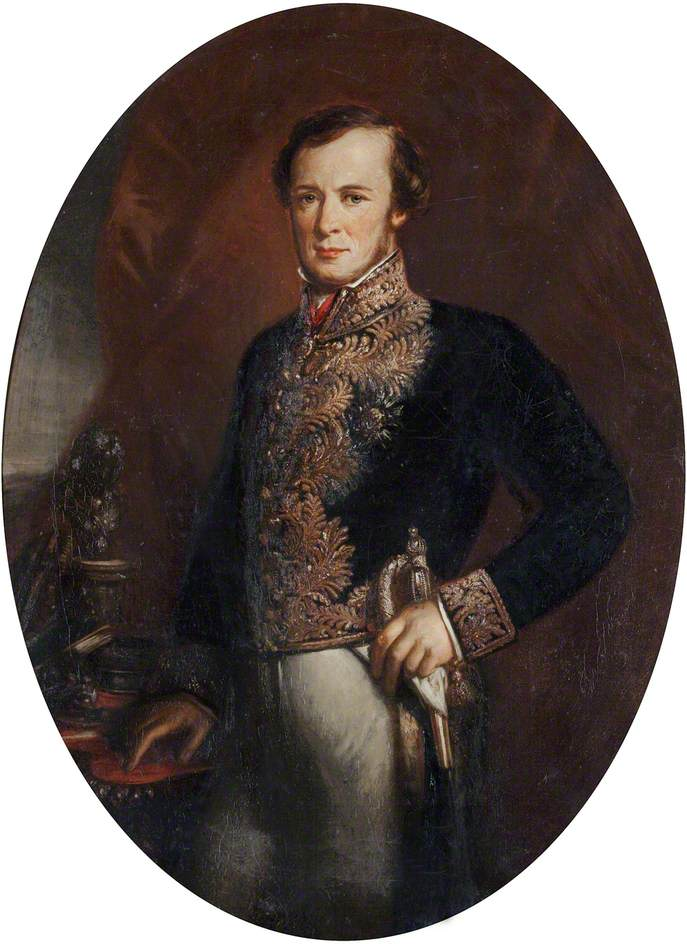
Lunteschütz’s portrait of Sir Alexander Malet

Seated cavalier with a lady, by Lunteschütz

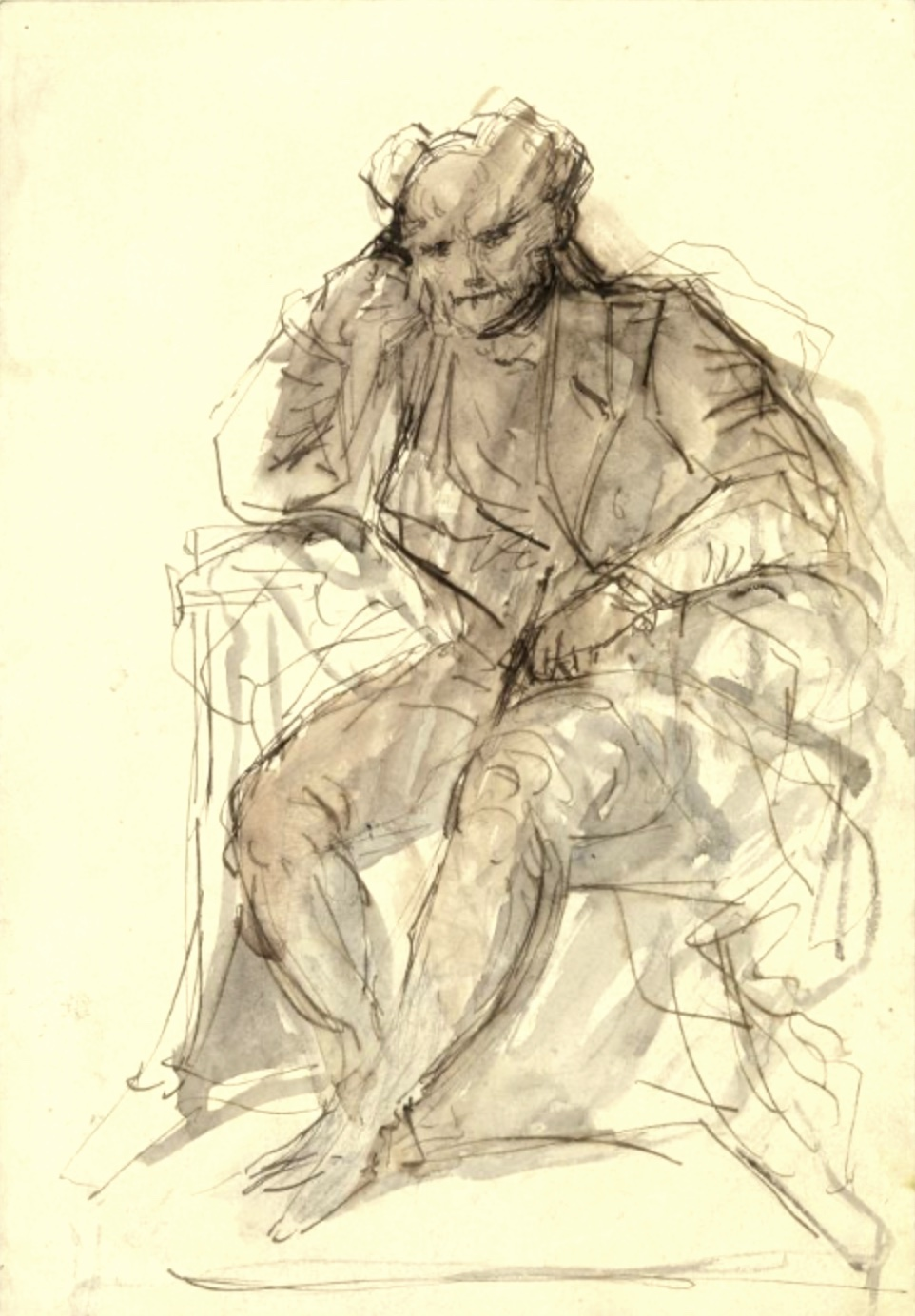
Figure study of Arthur Schopenhauer by Lunteschütz

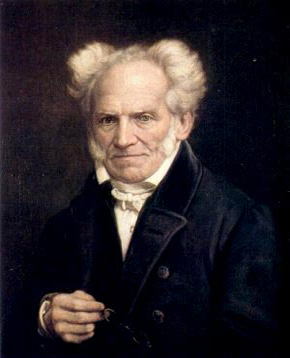
Portrait of Arthur Schopenhauer by Lunteschütz
