= Karl Witte =

German jurist and scholar of Dante Alighieri

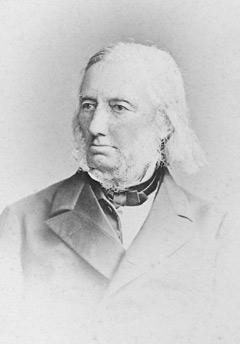
Karl Witte.

Johann Heinrich Friedrich Karl Witte (July 1, 1800 – March 6, 1883) was a German jurist and scholar of Dante Alighieri.

== Biography ==
Karl Witte was born in Lochau, now part of Schkopau. He was the son of pastor Karl Heinrich Gottfried Witte (1767–1845) who encouraged a fairly intense program of learning. When Karl Witte was nine, he spoke German, French, Italian, Latin, and Greek, and on April 10, 1814, at the age of 13, he became a doctor of philosophy at the University of Giessen in Germany. As a result, Witte was listed in The Guinness Book of World Records as the "youngest doctorate", a record that still stands; however, The Guinness Book of World Records lists his age as 12.

Witte was the subject of a book written by his father: The Education of Karl Witte: Or, The Training of the Child. This book attracted criticism and soon fell into oblivion in Germany.

He achieved his reputation as a Dante scholar in 1823 with his essay "The Art of Misunderstanding Dante".

Witte died in Halle.
