= Mind–body dualism =

Philosophical view that consiousness and the body are fundamentally different

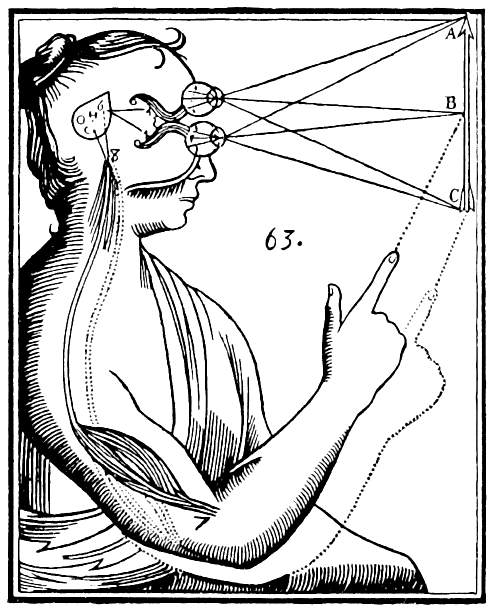
Illustration of mind–body dualism by René Descartes. Inputs are passed by the sensory organs to the pineal gland, and from there to the immaterial spirit.

In philosophy of mind, mind–body dualism denotes either that mental phenomena are non-physical, or that the mind and body are distinct and separable. Thus, it encompasses a set of views about the relationship between mind and matter, as well as between subject and object, and is contrasted with other positions, such as physicalism and enactivism, in the mind–body problem.

Aristotle shared Plato's view of multiple souls and further elaborated a hierarchical arrangement, corresponding to the distinctive functions of plants, animals, and humans: a nutritive soul of growth and metabolism that all three share; a perceptive soul of pain, pleasure, and desire that only humans and other animals share; and the faculty of reason that is unique to humans only. In this view, a soul is the hylomorphic form of a viable organism, wherein each level of the hierarchy formally supervenes upon the substance of the preceding level. For Aristotle, the first two souls, based on the body, perish when the living organism dies, whereas there remains an immortal and perpetual intellective part of mind. For Plato, however, the soul was not dependent on the physical body; he believed in metempsychosis, the migration of the soul to a new physical body. It has been considered a form of reductionism by some philosophers, since it enables the tendency to ignore very big groups of variables by its assumed association with the mind or the body, and not for its real value when it comes to explaining or predicting a studied phenomenon.

Dualism is closely associated with the thought of René Descartes (1641), who holds that the mind is a nonphysical—and therefore, non-spatial—substance. Descartes clearly identified the mind with consciousness and self-awareness and distinguished this from the physical brain as the seat of intelligence. Hence, he was the first documented Western philosopher to formulate the mind–body problem in the form in which it exists today. However, the theory of substance dualism has many advocates in contemporary philosophy such as Richard Swinburne, J. P. Moreland, E. J. Lowe, Charles Taliaferro.

Dualism is contrasted with various kinds of monism. Substance dualism is contrasted with all forms of materialism, but property dualism may be considered a form of non-reductive physicalism.

== Types ==
Ontological dualism makes dual commitments about the nature of existence as it relates to mind and matter, and can be divided into three different types:

1. Substance dualism asserts that mind and matter are fundamentally distinct kinds of foundations.
2. Property dualism suggests that the ontological distinction lies in the differences between properties of mind and matter (as in emergentism).
3. Predicate dualism claims the irreducibility of mental predicates to physical predicates.

=== Substance or Cartesian dualism ===
Substance dualism asserts that mind and matter are fundamentally distinct kinds of foundations. There are different types of substance dualism. Most substance dualists hold the view that the mind and body are capable of causally affecting each other, known as interactionism. Notable defenders of substance dualism include John Foster, Stewart Goetz, Richard Swinburne and Charles Taliaferro.

Cartesian dualism, most famously defended by René Descartes, argues that there are two kinds of substances: mental and physical. Descartes states that the mental can exist outside of the body, and the body cannot think. Substance dualism is important historically for having given rise to much thought regarding the famous mind–body problem. It is compatible with theologies which claim that immortal souls occupy an independent realm of existence distinct from that of the physical world. Cartesians tend to equate the soul to the mind.

The Copernican Revolution and the scientific discoveries of the 17th century reinforced the belief that the scientific method was the unique way of knowledge. Bodies were seen as biological organisms to be studied in their constituent parts (materialism) by means of anatomy, physiology, biochemistry and physics (reductionism). Mind–body dualism remained the biomedical paradigm and model for the following three centuries.

=== Emergent dualism ===
Emergent dualism is a type of substance dualism that has been defended by William Hasker and Dean Zimmerman. Emergent dualism asserts that mental substances come into existence when physical systems such as the brain reach a sufficient level of complexity. Hasker defines emergent dualism as:

Human persons are not identical to any physical body, but consist of a physical body and a non-physical substantial soul, and (b) the human soul is naturally emergent from and dependent on the structure and function of a living human brain and nervous system.

Hasker has argued that emergent dualism is consistent with neuroscientific discoveries showing the dependence of mind on brain. He likens the individual mind to a magnetic field in its qualitative difference from the physical properties that generate it and also in its ability to act on the brain that generates it. Consciousness is said to arise when the brain reaches a certain threshold level of organizational complexity and when properly organized gives rise to the soul.

=== Thomistic dualism ===
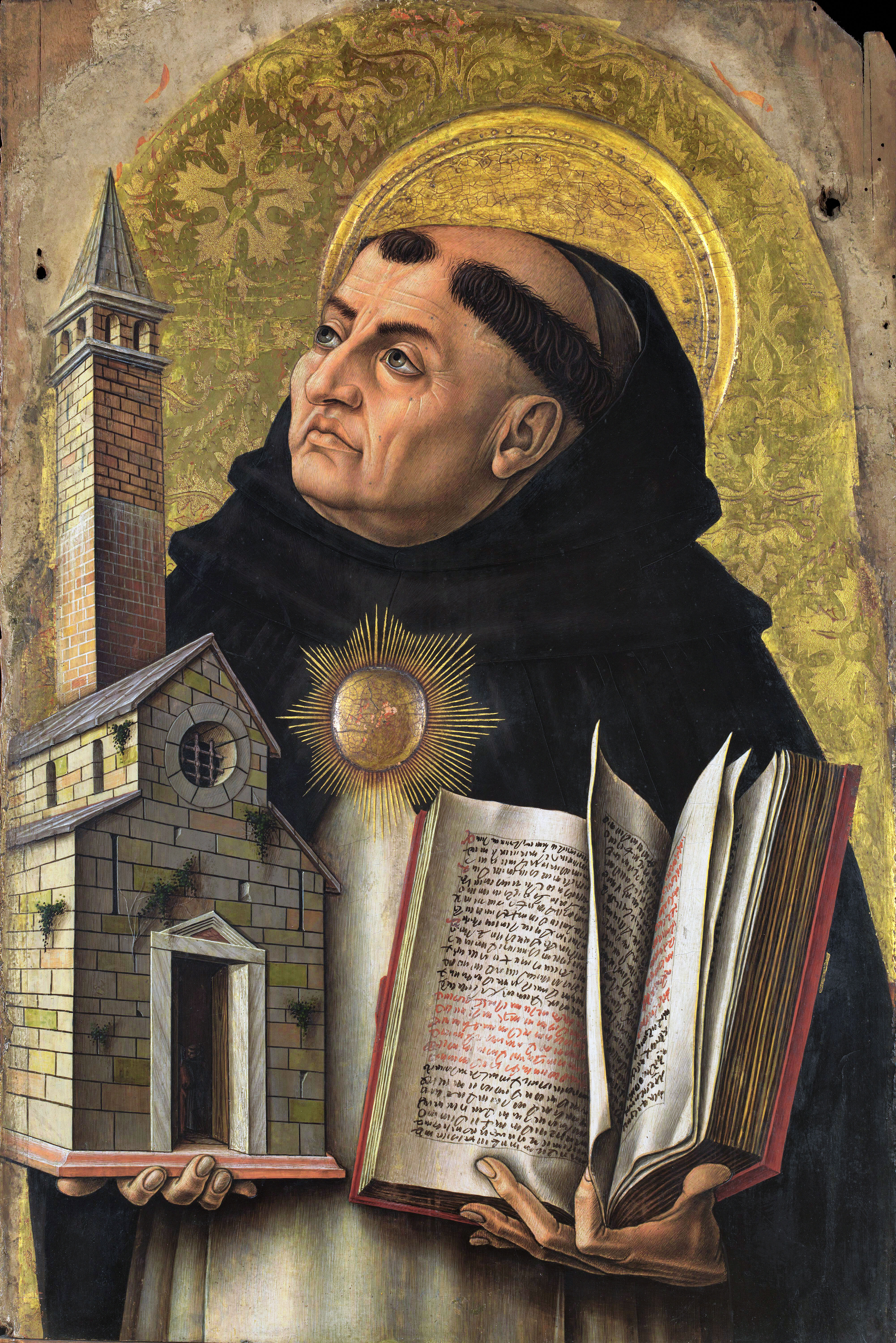
Dominican friar and philosopher Thomas Aquinas depicted in an altarpiece panel

Thomistic dualism is a type of dualism derived from the views of Thomas Aquinas. Edward Feser has written that:

Aristotelians and Thomists (those philosophers whose views are derived from St.Thomas Aquinas) sometimes suggest that their hylomorphic position is no more a version of dualism than it is of materialism. But though their view is not a Cartesian form of dualism, it is clear from a consideration of how the human soul differs from the souls of plants and animals (at least on the Thomistic variation of hylomorphism) that the view does amount to a kind of dualism: Thomistic dualism or hylomorphic dualism, as it has variously been called.

Thomistic substance dualism has been defended by J. P. Moreland and Scott B. Rae. Thomistic substance dualism distinguishes itself from Cartesian substance dualism by denying that the body and soul are different substances. Instead, a person is composed of only one substance, the soul, while the body is considered an ensouled physical structure. J. P. Moreland has commented:

Thomistic substance dualism is not a dualism of two separable substances. There is only one substance, though I do not identify it with the body/soul composite. Rather, I take the one substance to be the soul, and the body to be an ensouled biological and physical structure that depends on the soul for its existence.

Eleonore Stump has suggested that Thomas Aquinas's views on matter and the soul are difficult to define in contemporary discussion but he would fit the criteria as a non-Cartesian substance dualist.

Other terms for Thomistic dualism include hylomorphic dualism or Thomistic hylomorphism which are contrasted with substance dualism. Hylomorphism is distinct from substance dualism as it holds the view that the immaterial (form) and material (matter) are not distinct substances and only share an efficient causality.

Thomistic scholars such as Paul Chutikorn and Edward Feser have written that Aquinas was not a substance dualist. Edward Feser who has defended hylomorphic dualism has suggested that it has advantages over substance dualism such as offering a possible solution to the interaction problem. Paul Chutikorn has commented that "adopting Aquinas' view of substance will provide a solution to the problem by avoiding altogether the position that man is made up of dual substances. Rather, Aquinas shows us that we can acknowledge a duality within substance itself, while maintaining its inherent substantial unity".

Aristotelian hylomorphic dualism also has many similarities with Thomistic dualism. Michael Egnor is a notable advocate of Aristotelian dualism.

=== Property dualism ===
Property dualism asserts that an ontological distinction lies in the differences between properties of mind and matter, and that consciousness may be ontologically irreducible to neurobiology and physics. It asserts that when matter is organized in the appropriate way (i.e., in the way that living human bodies are organized), mental properties emerge. Hence, it is a sub-branch of emergent materialism. What views properly fall under the property dualism rubric is itself a matter of dispute. There are different versions of property dualism, some of which claim independent categorisation.

Non-reductive physicalism is a form of property dualism in which it is asserted that all mental states are causally reducible to physical states. One argument for this has been made in the form of anomalous monism expressed by Donald Davidson, where it is argued that mental events are identical to physical events, however, strict law-governed causal relationships cannot describe relations of mental events. Another argument for this has been expressed by John Searle, who is the advocate of a distinctive form of physicalism he calls biological naturalism. His view is that although mental states are ontologically irreducible to physical states, they are causally reducible. He has acknowledged that "to many people" his views and those of property dualists look a lot alike, but he thinks the comparison is misleading.

=== Epiphenomenalism ===
Epiphenomenalism is a form of property dualism, in which it is asserted that one or more mental states do not have any influence on physical states (both ontologically and causally irreducible). It asserts that while material causes give rise to sensations, volitions, ideas, etc., such mental phenomena themselves cause nothing further: they are causal dead-ends. This can be contrasted to interactionism, on the other hand, in which mental causes can produce material effects, and vice versa.

=== Predicate dualism ===
Predicate dualism is a view espoused by such non-reductive physicalists as Donald Davidson and Jerry Fodor, who maintain that while there is only one ontological category of substances and properties of substances (usually physical), the predicates that we use to describe mental events cannot be redescribed in terms of (or reduced to) physical predicates of natural languages.

Predicate dualism is most easily defined as the negation of predicate monism. Predicate monism can be characterized as the view subscribed to by eliminative materialists, who maintain that such intentional predicates as believe, desire, think, feel, etc., will eventually be eliminated from both the language of science and from ordinary language because the entities to which they refer do not exist. Predicate dualists believe that so-called "folk psychology," with all of its propositional attitude ascriptions, is an ineliminable part of the enterprise of describing, explaining, and understanding human mental states and behavior.

For example, Davidson subscribes to anomalous monism, according to which there can be no strict psychophysical laws which connect mental and physical events under their descriptions as mental and physical events. However, all mental events also have physical descriptions. It is in terms of the latter that such events can be connected in law-like relations with other physical events. Mental predicates are irreducibly different in character (rational, holistic, and necessary) from physical predicates (contingent, atomic, and causal).

== Dualist views of mental causation ==
Four varieties of dualist causal interaction. The arrows indicate the direction of causations. Mental and physical states are shown in red and blue, respectively.

This part is about causation between properties and states of the thing under study, not its substances or predicates. Here a state is the set of all properties of what's being studied. Thus each state describes only one point in time.

=== Interactionism ===
Interactionism is the view that mental states, such as beliefs and desires, causally interact with physical states. This is a position which is very appealing to common-sense intuitions, notwithstanding the fact that it is very difficult to establish its validity or correctness by way of logical argumentation or empirical proof. It seems to appeal to common-sense because we are surrounded by such everyday occurrences as a child's touching a hot stove (physical event) which causes him to feel pain (mental event) and then yell and scream (physical event) which causes his parents to experience a sensation of fear and protectiveness (mental event) and so on.

=== Epiphenomenalism ===
Epiphenomenalism states that all mental events are caused by a physical event and have no physical consequences, and that one or more mental states do not have any influence on physical states. So, the mental event of deciding to pick up a rock ("M1") is caused by the firing of specific neurons in the brain ("P1"). When the arm and hand move to pick up the rock ("P2") this is not caused by the preceding mental event M1, nor by M1 and P1 together, but only by P1. The physical causes are in principle reducible to fundamental physics, and therefore mental causes are eliminated using this reductionist explanation. If P1 causes both M1 and P2, there is no overdetermination in the explanation for P2.

The idea that even if the animal were conscious nothing would be added to the production of behavior, even in animals of the human type, was first voiced by La Mettrie (1745), and then by Cabanis (1802), and was further explicated by Hodgson (1870) and Huxley (1874). Jackson gave a subjective argument for epiphenomenalism, but later rejected it and embraced physicalism.

=== Parallelism ===
Psychophysical parallelism is a very unusual view about the interaction between mental and physical events which was most prominently, and perhaps only truly, advocated by Gottfried Wilhelm von Leibniz. Like Malebranche and others before him, Leibniz recognized the weaknesses of Descartes' account of causal interaction taking place in a physical location in the brain. Malebranche decided that such a material basis of interaction between material and immaterial was impossible and therefore formulated his doctrine of occasionalism, stating that the interactions were really caused by the intervention of God on each individual occasion. Leibniz's idea is that God has created a pre-established harmony such that it only seems as if physical and mental events cause, and are caused by, one another. In reality, mental causes only have mental effects and physical causes only have physical effects. Hence, the term parallelism is used to describe this view.

=== Occasionalism ===
Occasionalism is a philosophical doctrine about causation which says that created substances cannot be efficient causes of events. Instead, all events are taken to be caused directly by God itself. The theory states that the illusion of efficient causation between mundane events arises out of a constant conjunction that God had instituted, such that every instance where the cause is present will constitute an "occasion" for the effect to occur as an expression of the aforementioned power. This "occasioning" relation, however, falls short of efficient causation. In this view, it is not the case that the first event causes God to cause the second event: rather, God first caused one and then caused the other, but chose to regulate such behaviour in accordance with general laws of nature. Some of its most prominent historical exponents have been Al-Ghazali, Louis de la Forge, Arnold Geulincx, and Nicolas Malebranche.

=== Kantianism ===
According to the philosophy of Immanuel Kant, there is a distinction between actions done by desire and those performed by reason in liberty (categorical imperative). Thus, not all physical actions are caused either by matter alone or by freedom alone. Some actions are purely animal in nature, while others are the result of mind's free action on matter.

== History ==
=== Ancient Greek philosophy ===
Hermotimus of Clazomenae (fl. c. 6th century BCE) was a philosopher who first proposed the idea of mind being fundamental in the cause of change. He proposed that physical entities are static, while reason causes the change. Sextus Empiricus places him with Hesiod, Parmenides, and Empedocles, as belonging to the class of philosophers who held a dualistic theory of a material and an active principle being together the origin of the universe. Similar ideas were expounded by Anaxagoras.

In the dialogue Phaedo, Plato formulated his famous Theory of forms as distinct and immaterial substances of which the objects and other phenomena that we perceive in the world are nothing more than mere shadows.

In the Phaedo, Plato makes it clear that the Forms are the universalia ante res, i.e. they are ideal universals, by which we are able to understand the world. In his allegory of the cave, Plato likens the achievement of philosophical understanding to emerging into the sunlight from a dark cave, where only vague shadows of what lies beyond that prison are cast dimly upon the wall. Plato's forms are non-physical and non-mental. They exist nowhere in time or space, but neither do they exist in the mind, nor in the pleroma of matter; rather, matter is said to "participate" in form (μεθεξις, methexis). It remained unclear however, even to Aristotle, exactly what Plato intended by that.

Aristotle argued at length against many aspects of Plato's forms, creating his own doctrine of hylomorphism wherein form and matter coexist. Ultimately however, Aristotle's aim was to perfect a theory of forms, rather than to reject it. Although Aristotle strongly rejected the independent existence Plato attributed to forms, his metaphysics do agree with Plato's a priori considerations quite often. For example, Aristotle argues that changeless, eternal substantial form is necessarily immaterial. Because matter provides a stable substratum for a change in form, matter always has the potential to change. Thus, if given an eternity in which to do so, it will, necessarily, exercise that potential.

Part of Aristotle's psychology, the study of the soul, is his account of the ability of humans to reason and the ability of animals to perceive. In both cases, perfect copies of forms are acquired, either by direct impression of environmental forms, in the case of perception, or else by virtue of contemplation, understanding and recollection. He believed the mind can literally assume any form being contemplated or experienced, and it was unique in its ability to become a blank slate, having no essential form. As thoughts of earth are not heavy, any more than thoughts of fire are causally efficient, they provide an immaterial complement for the formless mind.

=== From Neoplatonism to scholasticism ===
The philosophical school of Neoplatonism, most active in late antiquity, claimed that the physical and the spiritual are both emanations of the One. Neoplatonism exerted a considerable influence on Christianity, as did the philosophy of Aristotle via scholasticism.

In the scholastic tradition of Saint Thomas Aquinas, a number of whose doctrines have been incorporated into Roman Catholic dogma, the soul is the substantial form of a human being. Aquinas held the Quaestiones disputate de anima, or 'Disputed questions on the soul', at the Roman studium provinciale of the Dominican Order at Santa Sabina, the forerunner of the Pontifical University of Saint Thomas Aquinas, Angelicum during the academic year 1265–1266. By 1268 Aquinas had written at least the first book of the Sententia Libri De anima, Aquinas' commentary on Aristotle's De anima, the translation of which from the Greek was completed by Aquinas' Dominican associate at Viterbo, William of Moerbeke in 1267. Like Aristotle, Aquinas held that the human being was a unified composite substance of two substantial principles: form and matter. The soul is the substantial form and so the first actuality of a material organic body with the potentiality for life.

While Aquinas defended the unity of human nature as a composite substance constituted by these two inextricable principles of form and matter, he also argued for the incorruptibility of the intellectual soul, in contrast to the corruptibility of the vegetative and sensitive animation of plants and animals. His argument for the subsistence and incorruptibility of the intellectual soul takes its point of departure from the metaphysical principle that operation follows upon being (agiture sequitur esse), i.e., the activity of a thing reveals the mode of being and existence it depends upon. Since the intellectual soul exercises its own per se intellectual operations without employing material faculties, i.e. intellectual operations are immaterial, the intellect itself and the intellectual soul, must likewise be immaterial and so incorruptible. Even though the intellectual soul of man is able to subsist upon the death of the human being, Aquinas does not hold that the human person is able to remain integrated at death. The separated intellectual soul is neither a man nor a human person. The intellectual soul by itself is not a human person (i.e., an individual supposit of a rational nature). Hence, Aquinas held that "soul of St. Peter pray for us" would be more appropriate than "St. Peter pray for us", because all things connected with his person, including memories, ended with his corporeal life.

The Catholic doctrine of the resurrection of the body does not subscribe that, sees body and soul as forming a whole and states that at the second coming, the souls of the departed will be reunited with their bodies as a whole person (substance) and witness to the apocalypse. The thorough consistency between dogma and contemporary science was maintained here in part from a serious attendance to the principle that there can be only one truth. Consistency with science, logic, philosophy, and faith remained a high priority for centuries, and a university doctorate in theology generally included the entire science curriculum as a prerequisite. This doctrine is not universally accepted by Christians today. Many believe that one's immortal soul goes directly to Heaven upon death of the body.

=== Eastern philosophy ===
Early Chinese thought is often described as non-dualistic, but Slingerland and Chudek (2011) show that there are multiple classical texts that make clear distinctions between mental and physical processes. Their analysis of these texts suggests that certain forms of dualistic thinking were present in early Chinese traditions.

Some interpretations of Buddhist philosophy describe the mind and body as interdependent. Lin (2013) argues that classical buddhist texts do not support a strong separation between the mind and the body, but rather treat consciousness as something that comes from a mix of physical, cognitive, and environmental conditions.

=== Descartes and his disciples ===
In his Meditations on First Philosophy, René Descartes embarked upon a quest in which he called all his previous beliefs into doubt, to find out what he could be certain of. In so doing, he discovered that he could doubt whether he had a body (it could be that he was dreaming of it or that it was an illusion created by an evil demon), but he could not doubt whether he had a mind. This gave Descartes his first inkling that the mind and body were different things. The mind, according to Descartes, was a "thinking thing" (Latin: res cogitans), and an immaterial substance. This "thing" was the essence of himself, that which doubts, believes, hopes, and thinks. The body, "the thing that exists" (res extensa), regulates normal bodily functions (such as heart and liver). According to Descartes, animals only had a body and not a soul (which distinguishes humans from animals). The distinction between mind and body is argued in Meditation VI as follows: I have a clear and distinct idea of myself as a thinking, non-extended thing, and a clear and distinct idea of body as an extended and non-thinking thing. Whatever I can conceive clearly and distinctly, God can so create.

Some researchers have pointed out that modern discussions oversimplify what Descartes believed about the mind and body. Duncan (2000) argues that Descartes did not think of them as completely separate during everyday experiences, especially in terms of pain. In Descartes' writings, the mind and body are constantly interacting, which suggests a more complex view than the strict dualistic divide that he is popularly known for. Due to this view, later writers exaggerated the divide that has shaped how modern medicine views "Cartesian dualism" today.

The central claim of what is often called Cartesian dualism, in honor of Descartes, is that the immaterial mind and the material body, while being ontologically distinct substances, causally interact. Mental events cause physical events, and vice versa. But this leads to a substantial problem for Cartesian dualism: How can an immaterial mind cause anything in a material body, and vice versa? This has often been called the "problem of interactionism."

Descartes himself struggled to come up with a feasible answer to this problem. In his letter to Elisabeth of Bohemia, Princess Palatine, he suggested that spirits interacted with the body through the pineal gland, a small gland in the centre of the brain, between the two hemispheres. The term Cartesian dualism is also often associated with this more specific notion of causal interaction through the pineal gland. However, this explanation was not satisfactory: how can an immaterial mind interact with the physical pineal gland? Because Descartes' was such a difficult theory to defend, some of his disciples, such as Arnold Geulincx and Nicolas Malebranche, proposed a different explanation: That all mind–body interactions required the direct intervention of God. According to these philosophers, the appropriate states of mind and body were only the occasions for such intervention, not real causes. These occasionalists maintained the strong thesis that all causation was directly dependent on God, instead of holding that all causation was natural except for that between mind and body.

=== In medicine ===
In pain research, some scholars argue that splitting pain into "physical" versus "psychological" types reflects outdated dualistic thinking. Williams and Craig (2016) suggest that pain is influenced by biological, emotional, and social factors at the same time and treating them as separate can lead to poor care. They emphasize that effective pain management requires a holistic approach that considers how these dimensions work together, which highlights how focusing exclusively on the physical or psychological aspects may cause one to miss certain factors affecting a patient's experience.

Cultural beliefs about the causes of illness also show how dualism still plays a role in modern health attitudes. Tayeb (2019) studied public views about epilepsy in Saudi Arabia and found that people who connected epilepsy to spiritual or psychological causes were more likely to hold a stigmatized attitude towards the condition compared to those who viewed it as a neurological disorder. The study underscores how cultural frameworks of mind-body causation not only affect personal beliefs but also can have an effect on systemic barriers, such as a reluctance to perform treatment or even delay diagnosis.

Hane (2019) discusses the role of dualism in modern psychiatry. Instead of defending the strict separation between the mind and body, he emphasizes that mental and physical explanations offer different ways of understanding the same experience and often complement each other. Dualist ideas continue to shape clinical practices, influence how doctors diagnose patients, and guide treatment. Even when explicitly acknowledged, this affects both the practice of psychiatry and how patients experience mental distress.

In psychiatry, debates on the mind-body problem continue to influence how mental disorders are understood. Van Oudenhove and Cuypers (2010) argue that even as neuroscience advances, the underlying assumption that the mind is separate from the brain still shapes theory, diagnosis, and treatment.

A recent interdisciplinary review has suggested that debates about the mind–brain relationship can shape mental health research and clinical practice. It argues that distinguishing first-person subjective experience from third-person scientific investigation can help clarify conceptual issues surrounding diagnosis, treatment, and research in psychiatry.

=== In cognitive science ===
Research in cognitive anthropology shows that many cultures naturally treat the mind as something that can exist separately from the body. Cohen and Barret (2008) found this to be true in beliefs about spirits and possession, where people imagine minds or souls moving independently from the physical body. These cultural models suggest that seeing the mind and body as separate entities is not only a philosophical idea, rather it is something that influences how people experience everyday life.

Developmental research also suggests that children tend to see the mind, body, and soul as different things. Richert and Harris (2008) found that young children often treat mental abilities and spiritual qualities as separate from the physical body, supporting the idea that dualistic thinking starts early in life. For instance, children may believe that thoughts or feelings could continue even if someone is no longer living or that a person's soul can inhabit a different body or object.

=== Recent ===
In addition to already discussed theories of dualism (particularly the Christian and Cartesian models) there are new theories in the defense of dualism. Naturalistic dualism comes from Australian philosopher, David Chalmers (born 1966) who argues there is an explanatory gap between objective and subjective experience that cannot be bridged by reductionism because consciousness is, at least, logically autonomous of the physical properties upon which it supervenes. According to Chalmers, a naturalistic account of property dualism requires a new fundamental category of properties described by new laws of supervenience; the challenge being analogous to that of understanding electricity based on the mechanistic and Newtonian models of materialism prior to Maxwell's equations.

A similar defense comes from Australian philosopher Frank Jackson (born 1943) who revived the theory of epiphenomenalism which argues that mental states do not play a role in physical states. Jackson argues that there are two kinds of dualism:

1. substance dualism that assumes there is second, non-corporeal form of reality. In this form, body and soul are two different substances.
2. property dualism that says that body and soul are different properties of the same body.

He claims that functions of the mind/soul are internal, very private experiences that are not accessible to observation by others, and therefore not accessible by science (at least not yet). We can know everything, for example, about a bat's facility for echolocation, but we will never know how the bat experiences that phenomenon.

In 2018, The Blackwell Companion to Substance Dualism was published that contains arguments for and against Cartesian dualism, emergent dualism, Thomistic dualism, emergent individualism and nonreductive physicalism. Contributors include Charles Taliaferro, Edward Feser, William Hasker, J. P. Moreland, Richard Swinburne, Lynne Rudder Baker, John W. Cooper and Timothy O'Connor.

== Arguments for dualism ==
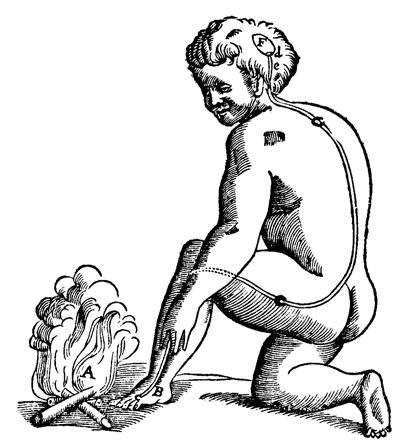
Another one of Descartes' illustrations. The fire displaces the skin, which pulls a tiny thread, which opens a pore in the ventricle (F) allowing the "animal spirit" to flow through a hollow tube, which inflates the muscle of the leg, causing the foot to withdraw.

=== The subjective argument ===
An important fact is that minds perceive intra-mental states differently from sensory phenomena, and this cognitive difference results in mental and physical phenomena having seemingly disparate properties. The subjective argument holds that these properties are irreconcilable under a physical mind.

Mental events have a certain subjective quality to them, whereas physical ones seem not to. So, for example, one may ask what a burned finger feels like, or what the blueness of the sky looks like, or what nice music sounds like. Philosophers of mind call the subjective aspects of mental events qualia. There is something that it's like to feel pain, to see a familiar shade of blue, and so on. There are qualia involved in these mental events. And the claim is that qualia cannot be reduced to anything physical.

Thomas Nagel first characterized the problem of qualia for physicalistic monism in his article, "What Is It Like to Be a Bat?". Nagel argued that even if we knew everything there was to know from a third-person, scientific perspective about a bat's sonar system, we still wouldn't know what it is like to be a bat. However, others argue that qualia are consequent of the same neurological processes that engender the bat's mind, and will be fully understood as the science develops.

Frank Jackson formulated his well-known knowledge argument based upon similar considerations. In this thought experiment, known as Mary's room, he asks us to consider a neuroscientist, Mary, who was born, and has lived all of her life, in a black and white room with a black and white television and computer monitor where she collects all the scientific data she possibly can on the nature of colours. Jackson asserts that as soon as Mary leaves the room, she will come to have new knowledge which she did not possess before: the knowledge of the experience of colours (i.e., what they are like). Although Mary knows everything there is to know about colours from an objective, third-person perspective, she has never known, according to Jackson, what it was like to see red, orange, or green. If Mary really learns something new, it must be knowledge of something non-physical, since she already knew everything about the physical aspects of colour.

However, Jackson later rejected his argument and embraced physicalism. He notes that Mary obtains knowledge not of color, but of a new intramental state, seeing color. Also, he notes that Mary might say "wow," and as a mental state affecting the physical, this clashed with his former view of epiphenomenalism. David Lewis' response to this argument, now known as the ability argument, is that what Mary really came to know was simply the ability to recognize and identify color sensations to which she had previously not been exposed. Daniel Dennett and others also provide arguments against this notion.

=== The zombie argument ===
The zombie argument is based on a thought experiment proposed by David Chalmers over the issue of qualia or the hard problem of consciousness. The basic idea is that one can imagine, and, therefore, conceive the existence of, an apparently functioning human being/body without any conscious states being associated with it.

Chalmers' argument is that it seems plausible that such a being could exist because all that is needed is that all and only the things that the physical sciences describe and observe about a human being must be true of the zombie. None of the concepts involved in these sciences make reference to consciousness or other mental phenomena, and any physical entity can be described scientifically via physics whether it is conscious or not. The mere logical possibility of a p-zombie demonstrates that consciousness is a natural phenomenon beyond the current unsatisfactory explanations. Chalmers states that one probably could not build a living p-zombie because living things seem to require a level of consciousness. However (unconscious?) robots built to simulate humans may become the first real p-zombies. Hence Chalmers half-jokingly calls for the need to build a "consciousness meter" to ascertain if any given entity, human or robot, is conscious or not.

Others such as Dennett have argued that the notion of a philosophical zombie is an incoherent, or unlikely, concept. In particular, nothing proves that an entity (e.g., a computer or robot) which would perfectly mimic human beings, and especially perfectly mimic expressions of feelings (like joy, fear, anger, ...), would not indeed experience them, thus having similar states of consciousness to what a real human would have. It is argued that under physicalism, one must either believe that anyone including oneself might be a zombie, or that no one can be a zombie—following from the assertion that one's own conviction about being (or not being) a zombie is a product of the physical world and is therefore no different from anyone else's.

Avshalom Elitzur has described himself as a "reluctant dualist". One argument Elitzur makes in favor of dualism is an argument from bafflement. According to Elitzur, a conscious being can conceive of a P-zombie version of his/herself. However, a P-zombie cannot conceive of a version of itself that lacks corresponding qualia.

=== Special sciences argument ===
Howard Robinson argues that, if predicate dualism is correct, then there are "special sciences" that are irreducible to physics. These allegedly irreducible subjects, which contain irreducible predicates, differ from hard sciences in that they are interest-relative. Here, interest-relative fields depend on the existence of minds that can have interested perspectives. Psychology is one such science; it completely depends on and presupposes the existence of the mind.

Physics is the general analysis of nature, conducted to understand how the universe behaves. On the other hand, the study of meteorological weather patterns or human behavior is only of interest to humans themselves. The point is that having a perspective on the world is a psychological state. Therefore, the special sciences presuppose the existence of minds which can have these states. If one is to avoid ontological dualism, then the mind that has a perspective must be part of the physical reality to which it applies its perspective. If this is the case, then to perceive the physical world as psychological, the mind must have a perspective on the physical. This, in turn, presupposes the existence of mind.

However, cognitive science and psychology do not require the mind to be irreducible, and operate on the assumption that it has physical basis. In fact, it is common in science to presuppose a complex system; while fields such as chemistry, biology, or geology could be verbosely expressed in terms of quantum field theory, it is convenient to use levels of abstraction like molecules, cells, or the mantle. It is often difficult to decompose these levels without heavy analysis and computation. Sober has also advanced philosophical arguments against the notion of irreducibility.

=== Argument from personal identity ===
This argument concerns the differences between the applicability of counterfactual conditionals to physical objects, on the one hand, and to conscious, personal agents on the other. In the case of any material object, e.g. a printer, we can formulate a series of counterfactuals in the following manner:

1. This printer could have been made of straw.
2. This printer could have been made of some other kind of plastics and vacuum-tube transistors.
3. This printer could have been made of 95% of what it is actually made of and 5% vacuum-tube transistors, etc..

Somewhere along the way from the printer's being made up exactly of the parts and materials which actually constitute it to the printer's being made up of some different matter at, say, 20%, the question of whether this printer is the same printer becomes a matter of arbitrary convention.

Imagine the case of a person, Frederick, who has a counterpart born from the same egg and a slightly genetically modified sperm. Imagine a series of counterfactual cases corresponding to the examples applied to the printer. Somewhere along the way, one is no longer sure about the identity of Frederick. In this latter case, it has been claimed, overlap of constitution cannot be applied to the identity of mind. As Madell puts it:

But while my present body can thus have its partial counterpart in some possible world, my present consciousness cannot. Any present state of consciousness that I can imagine either is or is not mine. There is no question of degree here.

If the counterpart of Frederick, Frederickus, is 70% constituted of the same physical substance as Frederick, does this mean that it is also 70% mentally identical with Frederick? Does it make sense to say that something is mentally 70% Frederick? A possible solution to this dilemma is that of open individualism.

Richard Swinburne, in his book The Existence of God, put forward an argument for mind-body dualism based upon personal identity. He states that the brain is composed of two hemispheres and a cord linking the two and that, as modern science has shown, either of these can be removed without the person losing any memories or mental capacities.

He then cites a thought-experiment for the reader, asking what would happen if each of the two hemispheres of one person were placed inside two different people. Either, Swinburne claims, one of the two is me or neither is—and there is no way of telling which, as each will have similar memories and mental capacities to the other. In fact, Swinburne claims, even if one's mental capacities and memories are far more similar to the original person than the others' are, they still may not be him.

From here, he deduces that even if we know what has happened to every single atom inside a person's brain, we still do not know what has happened to 'them' as an identity. From here it follows that a part of our mind, or our soul, is immaterial, and, as a consequence, that mind-body dualism is true.

Christian List argues that Benj Hellie's vertiginous question, i.e. why people exist as themselves and not as someone else, and the existence of first-personal facts, are a refutation of physicalist philosophies of consciousness. List argues that first personal facts cannot supervene on third personal facts. However, List also argues that this also refutes standard versions of mind-body dualism that have purely third-personal metaphysics.

=== Argument from reason ===
Philosophers and scientists such as Victor Reppert, William Hasker, and Alvin Plantinga have developed an argument for dualism dubbed the "argument from reason". They credit C. S. Lewis with first bringing the argument to light in his book Miracles; Lewis called the argument "The Cardinal Difficulty of Naturalism", which was the title of chapter three of Miracles.

The argument postulates that if, as naturalism entails, all of our thoughts are the effect of a physical cause, then we have no reason for assuming that they are also the consequent of a reasonable ground. However, knowledge is apprehended by reasoning from ground to consequent. Therefore, if naturalism were true, there would be no way of knowing it (or anything else), except by a fluke.

Through this logic, the statement "I have reason to believe naturalism is valid" is inconsistent in the same manner as "I never tell the truth." That is, to conclude its truth would eliminate the grounds from which to reach it. To summarize the argument in the book, Lewis quotes J. B. S. Haldane, who appeals to a similar line of reasoning:

If my mental processes are determined wholly by the motions of atoms in my brain, I have no reason to suppose that my beliefs are true...and hence I have no reason for supposing my brain to be composed of atoms.

— J. B. S. Haldane, Possible Worlds, p. 209

In his essay "Is Theology Poetry?", Lewis himself summarises the argument in a similar fashion when he writes:

If minds are wholly dependent on brains, and brains on biochemistry, and biochemistry (in the long run) on the meaningless flux of the atoms, I cannot understand how the thought of those minds should have any more significance than the sound of the wind in the trees.

— C. S. Lewis, The Weight of Glory and Other Addresses, p. 139

But Lewis later agreed with Elizabeth Anscombe's response to his Miracles argument. She showed that an argument could be valid and ground-consequent even if its propositions were generated via physical cause and effect by non-rational factors. Similar to Anscombe, Richard Carrier and John Beversluis have written extensive objections to the argument from reason on the untenability of its first postulate.

=== Cartesian arguments ===
Descartes puts forward two main arguments for dualism in Meditations: firstly, the "modal argument," or the "clear and distinct perception argument," and secondly the "indivisibility" or "divisibility" argument.

Summary of the 'modal argument'
It is imaginable that one's mind might exist without one's body.
therefore
It is conceivable that one's mind might exist without one's body.
therefore
It is possible one's mind might exist without one's body.
therefore
One's mind is a different entity from one's body.

The argument is distinguished from the Zombie Argument as it establishes that the mind could continue to exist without the body, rather than that the unaltered body could exist without the mind. Alvin Plantinga, J. P. Moreland, and Edward Feser have both supported the argument, although Feser and Moreland think that it must be carefully reformulated to be effective.

The indivisibility argument for dualism was phrased by Descartes as follows:

[T]here is a great difference between a mind and a body, because the body, by its very nature, is something divisible, whereas the mind is plainly indivisible...insofar as I am only a thing that thinks, I cannot distinguish any parts in me.... Although the whole mind seems to be united to the whole body, nevertheless, were a foot or an arm or any other bodily part amputated, I know that nothing would be taken away from the mind...

The argument relies upon Leibniz' principle of the identity of indiscernibles, which states that two things are the same if and only if they share all their properties. A counterargument is the idea that matter is not infinitely divisible, and thus that the mind could be identified with material things that cannot be divided, or potentially Leibnizian monads.

== Arguments against dualism ==
=== Arguments from causal interaction ===
Cartesian dualism compared to three forms of monism

One argument against dualism is with regard to causal interaction. If consciousness (the mind) can exist independently of physical reality (the brain), one must explain how physical memories are created concerning consciousness. Dualism must therefore explain how consciousness affects physical reality. One of the main objections to dualistic interactionism is lack of explanation of how the material and immaterial are able to interact. Varieties of dualism according to which an immaterial mind causally affects the material body and vice versa have come under strenuous attack from different quarters, especially in the 20th century. Critics of dualism have often asked how something totally immaterial can affect something totally material—this is the basic problem of causal interaction.

First, it is not clear where the interaction would take place. For example, burning one's finger causes pain. Apparently there is some chain of events, leading from the burning of skin, to the stimulation of nerve endings, to something happening in the peripheral nerves of one's body that lead to one's brain, to something happening in a particular part of one's brain, and finally resulting in the sensation of pain. But pain is not supposed to be spatially locatable. It might be responded that the pain "takes place in the brain." But evidently, the pain is in the finger. This may not be a devastating criticism.

However, there is a second problem about the interaction. Namely, the question of how the interaction takes place, where in dualism "the mind" is assumed to be non-physical and by definition outside of the realm of science. The mechanism which explains the connection between the mental and the physical would therefore be a philosophical proposition as compared to a scientific theory. For example, compare such a mechanism to a physical mechanism that is well understood. Take a very simple causal relation, such as when a cue ball strikes an eight ball and causes it to go into the pocket. What happens in this case is that the cue ball has a certain amount of momentum as its mass moves across the pool table with a certain velocity, and then that momentum is transferred to the eight ball, which then heads toward the pocket. Compare this to the situation in the brain, where one wants to say that a decision causes some neurons to fire and thus causes a body to move across the room. The intention to "cross the room now" is a mental event and, as such, it does not have physical properties such as force. If it has no force, then it would seem that it could not possibly cause any neuron to fire. However, with Dualism, an explanation is required of how something without any physical properties has physical effects.

More recent philosophical work has revisited the issue of how a non-physical mind could affect a physical body. Tiehen (2016) argues that because modern science assumes the physical world is "causally closed," it becomes difficult for dualism to explain how the mind could play a causal role without breaking this principle. This problem led some philosophers to suggest alternate frameworks to explain how mental states might influence bodily processes without breaking any physical laws.

==== Replies ====
Alfred North Whitehead, and later David Ray Griffin, framed a new ontology (process philosophy) seeking precisely to avoid the pitfalls of ontological dualism.

The explanation provided by Arnold Geulincx and Nicolas Malebranche is that of occasionalism, where all mind–body interactions require the direct intervention of God.

At the time C. S. Lewis wrote Miracles, quantum mechanics (and physical indeterminism) was only in the initial stages of acceptance, but still Lewis stated the logical possibility that, if the physical world was proved to be indeterministic, this would provide an entry (interaction) point into the traditionally viewed closed system, where a scientifically described physically probable/improbable event could be philosophically described as an action of a non-physical entity on physical reality. He states, however, that none of the arguments in his book will rely on this. Although some interpretations of quantum mechanics consider wave function collapse to be indeterminate, in others this event is defined as deterministic.

=== Argument from physics ===
The argument from physics is closely related to the argument from causal interaction. Many physicists and consciousness researchers have argued that any action of a nonphysical mind on the brain would entail the violation of physical laws, such as the conservation of energy.

By assuming a deterministic physical universe, the objection can be formulated more precisely. When a person decides to walk across a room, it is generally understood that the decision to do so, a mental event, immediately causes a group of neurons in that person's brain to fire, a physical event, which ultimately results in his walking across the room. The problem is that if there is something totally non-physical causing a bunch of neurons to fire, then there is no physical event which causes the firing. This means that some physical energy is required to be generated against the physical laws of the deterministic universe—this is by definition a miracle and there can be no scientific explanation of (repeatable experiment performed regarding) where the physical energy for the firing came from. Such interactions would violate the fundamental laws of physics. In particular, if some external source of energy is responsible for the interactions, then this would violate the law of the conservation of energy. Dualistic interactionism has therefore been criticized for violating a general heuristic principle of science: the causal closure of the physical world.

==== Replies ====
The Stanford Encyclopedia of Philosophy and the New Catholic Encyclopedia provide two possible replies to the above objections. The first reply is that the mind may influence the distribution of energy, without altering its quantity. The second possibility is to deny that the human body is causally closed, as the conservation of energy applies only to closed systems. However, physicalists object that no evidence exists for the causal non-closure of the human body. Robin Collins responds that energy conservation objections misunderstand the role of energy conservation in physics. Well understood scenarios in general relativity violate energy conservation and quantum mechanics provides precedent for causal interactions, or correlation without energy or momentum exchange. However, this does not mean the mind spends energy and, despite that, it still doesn't exclude the supernatural.

Another reply is akin to parallelism—Mills holds that behavioral events are causally overdetermined, and can be explained by either physical or mental causes alone. An overdetermined event is fully accounted for by multiple causes at once. However, J. J. C. Smart and Paul Churchland have pointed out that if physical phenomena fully determine behavioral events, then by Occam's razor an unphysical mind is unnecessary.

Howard Robinson suggests that the interaction may involve dark energy, dark matter or some other currently unknown scientific process.

Another reply is that the interaction taking place in the human body may not be described by "billiard ball" classical mechanics. If a nondeterministic interpretation of quantum mechanics is correct then microscopic events are indeterminate, where the degree of determinism increases with the scale of the system. Philosophers Karl Popper and John Eccles and physicist Henry Stapp have theorized that such indeterminacy may apply at the macroscopic scale. However, Max Tegmark has argued that classical and quantum calculations show that quantum decoherence effects do not play a role in brain activity.

Yet another reply to the interaction problem is to note that it doesn't seem that there is an interaction problem for all forms of substance dualism. For instance, Thomistic dualism doesn't obviously face any issue with regards to interaction, for in this view the soul and the body are related as form and matter.

=== Argument from brain damage ===
This argument has been formulated by Paul Churchland, among others. The point is that, in instances of some sort of brain damage (e.g. caused by automobile accidents, drug abuse, pathological diseases, etc.), it is always the case that the mental substance and/or properties of the person are significantly changed or compromised. If the mind were a completely separate substance from the brain, how could it be possible that every single time the brain is injured, the mind is also injured? Indeed, it is very frequently the case that one can even predict and explain the kind of mental or psychological deterioration or change that human beings will undergo when specific parts of their brains are damaged. So the question for the dualist to try to confront is how can all of this be explained if the mind is a separate and immaterial substance from, or if its properties are ontologically independent of, the brain.

Phineas Gage, who suffered destruction of one or both frontal lobes by a projectile iron rod, is often cited as an example illustrating that the brain causes mind. Gage certainly exhibited some mental changes after his accident, suggesting a correlation between brain states and mental states. It has been noted, however, that Gage's most serious mental changes were only temporary, and that he made a reasonable social and mental recovery. The changes in question have almost always been distorted and exaggerated by scientific and popular literature, often relying on hearsay. Similar examples abound; neuroscientist David Eagleman describes the case of another individual who exhibited escalating pedophilic tendencies at two different times, and in each case was found to have tumors growing in a particular part of his brain.

Case studies aside, modern experiments have demonstrated that the relation between brain and mind is much more than simple correlation. By damaging, or manipulating, specific areas of the brain repeatedly under controlled conditions (e.g. in monkeys) and reliably obtaining the same results in measures of mental state and abilities, neuroscientists have shown that the relation between damage to the brain and mental deterioration is likely causal. This conclusion is further supported by data from the effects of neuro-active chemicals (e.g., those affecting neurotransmitters) on mental functions, but also from research on neurostimulation (direct electrical stimulation of the brain, including transcranial magnetic stimulation).

==== Replies ====
Property dualism and William Hasker's "emergent dualism" seek to avoid this problem. They assert that the mind is a property or substance that emerges from the appropriate arrangement of physical matter, and therefore could be affected by any rearrangement of matter.

Writing in the 13th century, St. Thomas Aquinas writes that "the body is necessary for the action of the intellect, not as it's origin of action." Thus, if the body is dysfunctional, the intellect will not actualize as it intends to. According to the philosopher Stephen Evans:

We did not need neurophysiology to come to know that a person whose head is bashed in with a club quickly loses his or her ability to think or have any conscious processes. Why should we not think of neurophysiological findings as giving us detailed, precise knowledge of something that human beings have always known, or at least could have known, which is that the mind (at least in this mortal life) requires and depends on a functioning brain? We now know a lot more than we used to know about precisely how the mind depends on the body. However, that the mind depends on the body, at least prior to death, is surely not something discovered in the 20th century".

=== Argument from neuroscience ===
In some contexts, the decisions that a person makes can be detected up to 10 seconds in advance by means of scanning their brain activity. Subjective experiences and covert attitudes can be detected, as can mental imagery. This is cited as empirical evidence that cognitive processes have a physical basis in the brain.

Some recent work in robotics and artificial intelligence has also found issues with traditional dualistic ideas. Sandini, Scuitti, and Morasso (2024) argue that intelligent behavior depends on how a body interacts with the environment, and that purely abstract forms of artificial intelligence may miss key parts of what makes natural cognition possible. This highlights the importance of sensorimotor experiences and attempts made to replicate human intelligence in machines need to consider physical embodiment and adaptive learning instead of just relying on abstract computational models.

==== Replies ====
Thomist philosopher Edward Feser criticises the use of neuroscience to support a naturalist account of the mind, drawing from philosopher Tyler Burge in calling such arguments "neurobabble." Feser accepts that neural activities underlie mental processes, but that this is to be expected from the view of hylomorphic dualism, since the soul is a composite of mind and matter.

=== Argument from simplicity ===
The argument from simplicity is probably the simplest and also the most common form of argument against dualism of the mental. The dualist is always faced with the question of why anyone should find it necessary to believe in the existence of two, ontologically distinct, entities (mind and brain), when it seems possible and would make for a simpler thesis to test against scientific evidence, to explain the same events and properties in terms of one. It is a heuristic principle in science and philosophy not to assume the existence of more entities than is necessary for clear explanation and prediction.

==== Replies ====
This argument was criticized by Peter Glassen in a debate with J. J. C. Smart in the pages of Philosophy in the late 1970s and early 1980s. Glassen argued that, because it is not a physical entity, Occam's razor cannot consistently be appealed to by a physicalist or materialist as a justification of mental states or events, such as the belief that dualism is false. The idea is that Occam's razor may not be as "unrestricted" as it is normally described (applying to all qualitative postulates, even abstract ones) but instead concrete (only applies to physical objects). If one applies Occam's Razor unrestrictedly, then it recommends monism until pluralism either receives more support or is disproved. If one applies Occam's Razor only concretely, then it may not be used on abstract concepts (this route, however, has serious consequences for selecting between hypotheses about the abstract).

== See also ==
- Explanatory gap
- Mentalism (psychology)
- Nondualism
- Hard problem of consciousness
- Bipartite (theology)
- The Concept of Mind by Gilbert Ryle
- Trialism
- Advaita vedanta
- Vertiginous question
