= Divine conservation =

In Christian theology, divine conservation is the principle that God is responsible for maintaining the continued existence of the universe. In (modern) theological terms, it is the underpinning of the conservation of mass-energy, theologians holding that this principle of physics by definition does not deal in why a closed system continues to exist, only what happens within it as it does. God has a conserving power that is ever-present and exercised over the whole of creation.

One example modern formalism of divine conservation is given by Leibniz scholar Robert C. Sleigh Jr as two theses:

- For any finite individual substance x and time t, if x exists at t then God brings it about in toto (Note: in toto here, in Sleigh's words implies that "God is the total and exclusive and proximate cause"; and brings it about implies that "an exercise of real divine causal power via divine will is involved".) that x exists at t.
- For any state of affairs α and time t, if α obtains in the created world at t and α's obtaining at t requires a cause, then God brings it about in toto that α obtains at t.

Sleigh Jr labelled the first thesis weak conservation and the second thesis strong conservation. Todd Ryan later adopted largely the same labelling, from Sleigh Jr.

Scholars such as Descartes, Leibniz, and Malebranche can be said to agree with this modern formalism to different extents. A reduced form of the principle that was earlier espoused by Durandus of Saint-Pourçain is labelled by Alfred J. Freddoso and others mere conservation. In the other direction, some followers of Descartes such as Louis de La Forge and Antoine Le Grand expanded the principle, as did Malebranche, into occasionalism. An outright oppositional thesis is that of existential inertia.

The history of the concept goes back to Aquinas, and it influenced early scientific ideas about conserved quantities. In the 20th century, it resurged in popularity in theological circles as a way for scientific theists to harmonize modern scientific principles with Christian doctrines. Not only as a way to support theistic evolution in the later 20th century, in the 1950s it provided centuries old theological support for the steady-state universe model via Aquinas' arguments about continuous creation as an aspect of God's creation of the universe from nothing. (Note: In theological terminology, creation from nothing, creatio ex nihilo in Latin, subdivides into creatio continuans which is continuous creation and creatio originans which is original creation.)

== As theology ==
=== Orthodoxy ===
Divine conservation has existed in several confessions of faith over the centuries, including the Confessio Gallicana of 1858, the catechism of the Roman Catholic church, and the 1560 Scots Confession. The latter two hold that God ensures the continuation of creation, (Note: The catechism states of the "works of God" that "they derive existence from his supreme power, wisdom and goodness, so unless preserved continually by his superintending providence, and by the same power which produced them, they should instantly return into their original nothing".) lest all existence cease. It has some roots in the theology of Thomas Aquinas, who held that divine providence incorporated conservation. (Note: Aquinas directly stated in Summa Theologica part 1, question 104, article 1 that "For the being of every creature depends on God, so that not for a moment could it subsist, but would fall into nothingness were it not kept in being by the operation of the Divine power", attributing this to Gregory the Great's Moralia in Job) It is also propounded in the Conimbricenses, in René Descartes's Third Meditation, and in the early writings of Immanuel Kant who presented God as Urheber und Erhalter (creator and conserver) of the universe.

The principle holds that there is a difference between creation and annihilation, which involve bringing something from nothing and taking it back to nothing again, and construction and destruction, which are transformations of physical materials. Although natural things are capable of the latter, the principle holds that only God is capable of the former. The natural universe does not, according to this view, inherently possess a power of its own to continue to exist. There is no function of — to use an example of Hugh J. McCann supporting this view — Mount Everest to continue its own existence into the future, and natural objects have no observable mechanism of self-sustenance. Thus God performs a continuous action of preservation of Nature after creation, in the same way that it is Nature in turn that underpins the preservation of a work of art once the artist has created it. As Nature is the reason that human creations persist, so God is the reason that Nature itself persists. Divine conservation is also held to be the reason that supernatural entities that have no natural causes, such as angels, continue to exist.

In other words, God as a first cause is viewed not as just the first mover in a chain of cause-and-effect right at the point of creation of the universe, but also as a more general, eternal (i.e. outwith time), creator whose will it is that the universe functions from moment to moment, and that the chain of cause-and-effect even functions at all. In fact this latter view held significant sway in the early 20th century (as exemplified by Patrick Joseph Toner writing in the Catholic Encyclopedia) when it was still a mainstream idea in physics that the universe might have an infinite age; as there is no first cause in such a model, but there is still a theological argument that it is God that keeps physics going, thus creating the universe not at a specific instant of time but rather creating the universe at all points, eternally.

But it was not always so; Descartes and Pierre Gassendi debated whether there was a difference between the act of creation by God and the act of conservation, the former arguing that it was self-evident that the two were the same thing, and the latter arguing that conservation and creation are two different things. In this, Descartes was in agreement with the traditional Thomist position. As was Francisco Suárez, who held in his Disputations that creation and conservation were one and the same, discussing God's causal contributions to the universe in disputations 20 to 22 and holding that conservation was in fact simply the continued single act that began with creation.

Aquinas's own view was that of a long-held Christian doctrine, traceable through the Fourth Lateran Council (Note: The Council declared God to be the "Creator of all things visible and invisible, […] who, by His almighty power, from the beginning of time has created both orders in the same way out of nothing", which specifically acknowledges a beginning to time.) back to the times of John Philoponus and Tertullian, that God created the world ex nihilo at a point in the past, and that the age of the universe is finite. This contrasted with Greek philosophical thought at the time of the church fathers, which held that matter was everlasting and the universe had no beginning.

There is scriptural support for divine conservation in the Epistle to the Hebrews which states (Note: chapter 1 verse 3 (here using the Revised Standard Version); which Aquinas himself cited in Summa Theologica part 1, question 104, article 1) that the nature of God incorporates "upholding the universe by his word of power". Aquinas agreed that the principle of divine conservation logically allowed for an infinite-age universe, because it did not require that creation have a beginning and God could have atemporally (Note: Aquinas de-temporalizes creatio ex nihilo in Summa Theologica Part 1 question 45 article 1 and question 46 article 2, and also in the Summa contra gentiles 2.16 32–38.) created an entire infinite universe out of nothing, but argued for a finite universe as a matter of scripture.

The mainstream view of most theologians since Aquinas has been that only God has creation and conservation powers, with Aquinas holding that no being other than God could have an unlimited creation power. Later ones such as Suárez have held that although it is possible that God could create a being that could itself create and conserve, although arguing that such a being would still need the concurrence of God in any such acts, God has never done so, and this strongly implies that it is not possible for such a being to exist. However, these positions are not by themselves a full argument for conservation, which Suárez extended in disputation 11 with an argument that existence relies upon both creation and conservation.

=== Expansion, reduction, and outright rejection ===
Nicolas Malebranche, who held with occasionalism, argued that divine conservation amounts to continuous creation, inasmuch as conservation must by necessity involve creating an object with its entire set of properties, including its location and relations to all other objects in the universe. From that, Malebranche argued, it follows that created entities have no causal agency at all. This was opposed by Christian August Crusius, and later Kant; Crusius on the grounds that is impossible to know the internal character of God's actions, and thus to determine that conservation is the same as creation, and Kant on the grounds that it is a contradiction in terms, and that "[a] continuous beginning is contradictory. We cannot make any concept of it.".

Jonathan Edwards also held with occasionalism, and faced objections from Charles Hodge, which were similar to those later given by Herman Bavinck. Bavinck himself maintained the orthodox view, and argued that it was important in Christian theology to maintain a distinction between creation and conservation, especially in opposition to pantheism and deism. His argument that there was a distinction lay in the account of God resting, a period between creation ending and conservation beginning, in the Book of Genesis and the Book of Exodus. (Note: Genesis 2:2, Exodus 20:11 and 31:17)

On the other hand, Durandus, who took several anti-Thomist positions, agreed with Aquinas in rejecting occasionalism but disagreed with Aquinas's conception of conservation, in that it denied agency to God's creations; and instead held the mere conservation position, excluding any notion of divine concurrence, that God's conservation only involved ensuring continued existence and ensuring that cause-and-effect worked.

Leibniz, who held with the idea of conservation, observed that there were ways of misunderstanding it as a repeated re-creation, from moment to moment, of the entire universe from nothing. Jeffrey K. McDonough of Harvard University, who wrote about Leibniz, gives this the name the cinematic view of conservation, by analogy to moving pictures and the persistence of vision. It is also known as occasionalism. This view was strongly rejected by Leibniz because that is not continuous; its idea of time consisting of a set of disjoint instants he deemed to be as faulty as the idea that a continuous line consists of a set of disjoint points. Leibniz's idea of a continuous creation is rather a lack of discontinuities: that there is no point in any created creature's existence where it is not wholly reliant on God's conservation for its existence.

Not all philosophers agreed with divine conservation; Nicolaus Taurellus was one such. In his Kosmologia Taurellus held that divine conservation contradicted the idea that Creation was perfect, inasmuch as it implied that the universe lacked the ability to subsist of itself. This view sidesteps the problem that divine conservation has with the problem of evil and the observable existence of an imperfect universe.

Beyond even Durandus's position is that of existential inertia, expounded by modern theologians and philosophers such as Mortimer J. Adler in 1980 and John Beaudoin in 2007, which holds that created things have a form of inertia, by which they simply continue to be after creation unless actually destroyed by God.

== As science ==
=== God as the conservator of conserved quantities in early science ===
The concept of divine conservation was present in the works of Descartes, Gottfried Wilhelm Leibniz, George Berkeley, Jonathan Edwards and others. Pretty much all of the theistic scholars of the time accepted divine conservation in one form or another.

Descartes held in his Principles that it is God that conserves the quantity of motion. He derived this directly from the thesis that God is perfect and immutable. Leibniz took issue with Descartes, based upon results from Galileo, and asserted that it was vis viva that was conserved. He in turn connected this to divine conservation not as the moment-to-moment perfection of creation, but as the creation of the best possible world by establishing a creation with a regular order in which vis viva is conserved.

=== Fitting theology to 20th century scientific understanding ===
At the end of the 20th century science in turn influenced theology as the notion became popular amongst Christian theologians as a way of reconciling Biblical theology with modern scientific understanding of things like evolution, so-called theistic evolution. Emil Brunner argued that given the Biblical account of creation (in the Book of Genesis) as a progressive series of steps, of periods that are not strictly "days", then the idea of continuous creation was "not alien to the Bible". Ian A. McFarland has also talked of divine creation and divine conservation as "single aspects of a single divine project". Aquinas had also enabled theologians to point out that the steady-state universe model was not in conflict with Christian doctrine, as Aquinas had allowed for that.

Treated as a scientific hypothesis, divine conservation is untestable and unfalsifiable and thus outwith the realm of scientific inquiry. But Michael P. Levine of the University of Western Australia notes that it is still faultable on philosophical grounds. In particular, it has a strong dependence from a theistic position; remove the tacit assumption of theism and a lot of the statements made by Descartes et al. become self-evidently false. For example, without a theist foundation Descartes's assertion that conservation requires the same power as creation becomes evidently false when one considers that it does not require the same power to hold some material object in place as it does to initially move it to that place. In Levine's words it "does not take as much effort or force to maintain a house in existence as it takes to build it—though it may sometimes seem that way."

However, Philip L. Quinn advanced the position that it is also not incompatible with whatever mass-energy conservation laws modern physics may construct. Adolf Grünbaum argued that this is mistaken inasmuch as the mathematical formalisms offered by Quinn for these theological concepts in order to relate them to physics are so "obscure and elusive" that they end up lacking explanatory power. Grünbaum contradicted Quinn, arguing that neither the Big Bang nor the steady-state models of the universe are logically compatible with a claim that divine conservation and continuous creation are causally necessary to the universe. Grünbaum further argues that the principle of conservation of mass-energy is not only formulated in physics as a naturally arising law with no need for support; but furthermore, as taught at freshman science level, it states that mass-energy can neither be created nor destroyed, which stands in direct opposition to the argument that a divine being has the power to do exactly that.
