= Substance theory =

Basic ontological concept

Substance theory, or substance–attribute theory, is an ontological theory positing that objects are constituted each by a substance and properties borne by the substance but distinct from it. In this role, a substance can be referred to as a substratum or a thing-in-itself. Substances are particulars that are ontologically independent: they are able to exist all by themselves. Another defining feature often attributed to substances is their ability to undergo changes. Changes involve something existing before, during and after the change. They can be described in terms of a persisting substance gaining or losing properties. Attributes or properties, on the other hand, are entities that can be exemplified by substances. Properties characterize their bearers; they express what their bearer is like.

Substance is a key concept in ontology, the latter in turn part of metaphysics, which may be classified into monist, dualist, or pluralist varieties according to how many substances or individuals are said to populate, furnish, or exist in the world. According to monistic views, there is only one substance. Stoicism and Spinoza, for example, hold monistic views, that pneuma or God, respectively, is the one substance in the world. These modes of thinking are sometimes associated with the idea of immanence. Dualism sees the world as being composed of two fundamental substances (for example, the Cartesian substance dualism of mind and matter). Pluralist philosophies include Plato's Theory of Forms and Aristotle's hylomorphic categories.

== Ancient Greek philosophy ==
=== Aristotle ===
Aristotle used the term "substance" (Greek: οὐσία ousia) in a secondary sense for genera and species understood as hylomorphic forms. Primarily, however, he used it with regard to his category of substance, the specimen ("this person" or "this horse") or individual, qua individual, who survives accidental change and in whom the essential properties inhere that define those universals.

A substance—that which is called a substance most strictly, primarily, and most of all—is that which is neither said of a subject nor in a subject, e.g. the individual man or the individual horse. The species in which the things primarily called substances are, are called secondary substances, as also are the genera of these species. For example, the individual man belongs in a species, man, and animal is a genus of the species; so these—both man and animal—are called secondary substances.

— Aristotle, Categories 2a13 (trans. J. L. Ackrill)

In chapter 6 of book I the Physics Aristotle argues that any change must be analysed in reference to the property of an invariant subject: as it was before the change and thereafter. Thus, in his hylomorphic account of change, what is known as prime matter serves as a relative substratum of transformation, i.e. prime matter as a metaphysical principal in pure potency for the reception of a substantial form. In the Categories, properties are predicated only of substance, but in chapter 7 of book I of the Physics, Aristotle discusses substances coming to be and passing away in the "unqualified sense" wherein primary substances (πρῶται οὐσίαι; Categories 2a35) are generated from (or perish into) a material substratum by having gained (or lost) the essential property that formally defines substances of that kind (in the secondary sense). Examples of such a substantial change include not only conception and dying, but also metabolism, e.g., the bread a man eats becomes the man. On the other hand, in accidental change, because the essential property remains unchanged, by identifying the substance with its formal essence, substance may thereby serve as the relative subject matter or property-bearer of change in a qualified sense (i.e., barring matters of life or death). An example of this sort of accidental change is a change of color or size: a tomato becomes red, or a juvenile horse grows.

Aristotle thinks that in addition to primary substances (which are particulars), there are secondary substances (δεύτεραι οὐσίαι), which are universals (Categories 2a11–a18).

However, according to Aristotle's theology, a form of invariant form exists without matter, beyond the cosmos, powerless and oblivious, in the eternal substance of the unmoved mover.

=== Pyrrhonism ===
Early Pyrrhonism rejected the idea that substances exist. Pyrrho put this as:

"Whoever wants to live well (eudaimonia) must consider these three questions: First, how are pragmata (ethical matters, affairs, topics) by nature? Secondly, what attitude should we adopt towards them? Thirdly, what will be the outcome for those who have this attitude?" Pyrrho's answer is that "As for pragmata they are all adiaphora (undifferentiated by a logical differentia), astathmēta (unstable, unbalanced, not measurable), and anepikrita (unjudged, unfixed, undecidable). Therefore, neither our sense-perceptions nor our doxai (views, theories, beliefs) tell us the truth or lie; so we certainly should not rely on them. Rather, we should be adoxastoi (without views), aklineis (uninclined toward this side or that), and akradantoi (unwavering in our refusal to choose), saying about every single one, that it no more ‘is’, than it ‘is not’; or it both ‘is’ and ‘is not’, or it neither ‘is’, nor ‘is not’.

=== Stoicism ===
The Stoics rejected the idea that incorporeal beings inhere in matter, as taught by Plato. They believed that all being is corporeal infused with a creative fire called pneuma. Thus they developed a scheme of categories different from Aristotle's based on the ideas of Anaxagoras and Timaeus. The fundamental basis of Stoicism in this context was a universally consistent ethical and moral code that should be maintained at all time, the physical belief of beings as matter is an important philosophical footnote, as it marked the start of thinking as beings as inherently linked to reality, instead of to some abstract heaven.

=== Neoplatonism ===
Neoplatonists argue that beneath the surface phenomena that present themselves to our senses are three higher spiritual principles or hypostases, each one more sublime than the preceding. For Plotinus, these are the soul or world-soul, being/intellect or divine mind (nous), and "the one".

== Early modern philosophy ==
René Descartes means by a substance an entity which exists in such a way that it needs no other entity in order to exist. Therefore, only God is a substance in this strict sense. However, he extends the term to created things, which need only the concurrence of God to exist. He maintained that two of these are mind and body, each being distinct from the other in their attributes and therefore in their essence, and neither needing the other in order to exist. This is Descartes' substance dualism.

Baruch Spinoza denied Descartes' "real distinction" between mind and matter. Substance, according to Spinoza, is one and indivisible, but has multiple "attributes". He regards an attribute, though, as "what we conceive as constituting the [single] essence of substance". The single essence of one substance can be conceived of as material and also, consistently, as mental. What is ordinarily called the natural world, together with all the individuals in it, is immanent in God: hence his famous phrase deus sive natura ("God or Nature").

John Locke views substance through a corpuscularian lens where it exhibits two types of qualities which both stem from a source. He believes that humans are born tabula rasa or "blank slate" – without innate knowledge. In An Essay Concerning Human Understanding Locke writes that "first essence may be taken for the very being of anything, whereby it is, what it is." If humans are born without any knowledge, the way to receive knowledge is through perception of a certain object. But, according to Locke, an object exists in its primary qualities, no matter whether the human perceives it or not; it just exists. For example, an apple has qualities or properties that determine its existence apart from human perception of it, such as its mass or texture. The apple itself is also "pure substance in which is supposed to provide some sort of 'unknown support' to the observable qualities of things" that the human mind perceives. The foundational or support qualities are called primary essences which "in the case of physical substances, are the underlying physical causes of the object's observable qualities". But then what is an object except "the owner or support of other properties"? Locke rejects Aristotle's category of the forms, and develops mixed ideas about what substance or "first essence" means. Locke's solution to confusion about first essence is to argue that objects simply are what they are – made up of microscopic particles existing because they exist. According to Locke, the mind cannot completely grasp the idea of a substance as it "always falls beyond knowledge". There is a gap between what first essence truly means and the mind's perception of it that Locke believes the mind cannot bridge, objects in their primary qualities must exist apart from human perception.

The molecular combination of atoms in first essence then forms the solid base that humans can perceive and add qualities to describe - the only way humans can possibly begin to perceive an object. The way to perceive the qualities of an apple is from the combination of the primary qualities to form the secondary qualities. These qualities are then used to group the substances into different categories that "depend on the properties [humans] happen to be able to perceive". The taste of an apple or the feeling of its smoothness are not traits inherent to the fruit but are the power of the primary qualities to produce an idea about that object in the mind. The reason that humans can not sense the actual primary qualities is the mental distance from the object; thus, Locke argues, objects remain nominal for humans. Therefore, the argument then returns to how "a philosopher has no other idea of those substances than what is framed by a collection of those simple ideas which are found in them." The mind's conception of substances "[is] complex rather than simple" and "has no (supposedly innate) clear and distinct idea of matter that can be revealed through intellectual abstraction away from sensory qualities".

The last quality of substance is the way the perceived qualities seem to begin to change – such as a candle melting; this quality is called the tertiary quality. Tertiary qualities "of a body are those powers in it that, by virtue of its primary qualities, give it the power to produce observable changes in the primary qualities of other bodies"; "the power of the sun to melt wax is a tertiary quality of the sun". They are "mere powers; qualities such as flexibility, ductility; and the power of sun to melt wax". This goes along with "passive power: the capacity a thing has for being changed by another thing". In any object, at the core are the primary qualities (unknowable by the human mind), the secondary quality (how primary qualities are perceived), and tertiary qualities (the power of the combined qualities to make a change to the object itself or to other objects).

Robert Boyle's corpuscularian hypothesis states that "all material bodies are composites of ultimately small particles of matter" that "have the same material qualities as the larger composite bodies do". Using this basis, Locke defines his first group, primary qualities, as "the ones that a body doesn't lose, however much it alters." The materials retain their primary qualities even if they are broken down because of the unchanging nature of their atomic particles. If someone is curious about an object and they say it is solid and extended, these two descriptors are primary qualities. The second group consists of secondary qualities which are "really nothing but the powers to produce various sensations in us by their primary qualities." Locke argues that the impressions our senses perceive from the objects (i.e. taste, sounds, colors, etc.) are not natural properties of the object itself, but things they induce in us by means of the "size, shape, texture, and motion of their imperceptible parts." The bodies send insensible particles to our senses which let us perceive the object through different faculties; what we perceive is based on the object's composition. With these qualities, people can achieve the object through bringing "co-existing powers and sensible qualities to a common ground for explanation". Locke supposes that one wants to know what "binds these qualities" into an object, and argues that a "substratum" or "substance" has this effect, defining "substance" as follows:

[T]he idea of ours to which we give the general name substance, being nothing but the supposed but unknown support of those qualities we find existing and which we imagine can't exist sine re substante — that is, without some thing to support them — we call that support substantia; which, according to the true meaning of the word, is in plain English standing under or upholding.

— John Locke, An Essay Concerning Human Understanding; book 2, chapter 23

This substratum is a construct of the mind in an attempt to bind all the qualities seen together; it is only "a supposition of an unknown support of qualities that are able to cause simple ideas in us." Without making a substratum, people would be at a loss as to how different qualities relate. Locke does, however, mention that this substratum is an unknown, relating it to the story of the world on the turtle's back and how the believers eventually had to concede that the turtle just rested on "something he knew not what". This is how the mind perceives all things and from which it can make ideas about them; it is entirely relative, but it does provide a "regularity and consistency to our ideas". Substance, overall, has two sets of qualities — those that define it, and those related to how we perceive it. These qualities rush to our minds, which must organize them. As a result, our mind creates a substratum (or substance) for these objects, into which it groups related qualities.

== Criticism of soul as substance ==
Kant observed that the assertion of a spiritual soul as substance could be a synthetic proposition which, however, was unproved and completely arbitrary. Introspection does not reveal any diachronic substrate remaining unchanged throughout life. The temporal structure of consciousness is retentive-perceptive-prognostic. The selfhood arises as result of several informative flows: (1) signals from our own body; (2) retrieved memories and forecasts; (3) the affective load: dispositions and aversions; (4) reflections in other minds. Mental acts have the feature of appropriation: they are always attached to some pre-reflective consciousness. As visual perception is only possible from a definite point of view, so inner experience is given together with self-consciousness. The latter is not an autonomous mental act, but a formal way how the first person has their experience. From the pre-reflective consciousness, the person gains conviction of their existence. This conviction is immune to false reference. The concept of person is prior to the concepts of subject and body. The reflective self-consciousness is a conceptual and elaborate cognition. Selfhood is a self-constituting effigy, a task to be accomplished. Humans are incapable of comprising all their experience within the current state of consciousness; overlapping memories are critical for personal integrity. Appropriated experience can be recollected. At stage B, we remember the experience of stage A; at stage C, we may be aware of the mental acts of stage B. The idea of self-identity is enforced by the relatively slow changes of our body and social situation. Personal identity may be explained without accepting a spiritual agent as subject of mental activity. Associative connection between life episodes is necessary and sufficient for the maintenance of a united selfhood. Personal character and memories can persist after radical mutation of the body.

== Irreducible concepts ==
Two irreducible concepts encountered in substance theory are the bare particular and inherence.

=== Bare particular ===
In substance theory, a bare particular of an object is the element without which the object would not exist, that is, its substance, which exists independently from its properties, even if it is impossible for it to lack properties entirely. It is "bare" because it is considered without its properties and "particular" because it is not abstract. The properties that the substance has are said to inhere in the substance.

=== Inherence ===
Another primitive concept in substance theory is the inherence of properties within a substance. For example, in the sentence, "The apple is red" substance theory says that red inheres in the apple. Substance theory takes the meaning of an apple having the property of redness to be understood, and likewise that of a property's inherence in substance, which is similar to, but not identical with, being part of the substance.

The inverse relation is participation. Thus in the example above, just as red inheres in the apple, so the apple participates in red.

== Arguments supporting the theory ==
Two common arguments supporting substance theory are the argument from grammar and the argument from conception.

=== Argument from grammar ===
The argument from grammar uses traditional grammar to support substance theory. For example, the sentence "Snow is white" contains a grammatical subject "snow" and the predicate "is white", thereby asserting snow is white. The argument holds that it makes no grammatical sense to speak of "whiteness" disembodied, without asserting that snow or something else is white. Meaningful assertions are formed by virtue of a grammatical subject, of which properties may be predicated, and in substance theory, such assertions are made with regard to a substance.

Bundle theory rejects the argument from grammar on the basis that a grammatical subject does not necessarily refer to a metaphysical subject. Bundle theory, for example, maintains that the grammatical subject of a statement refers to its properties. For example, a bundle theorist understands the grammatical subject of the sentence, "Snow is white", to be a bundle of properties such as white. Accordingly, one can make meaningful statements about bodies without referring to substances.

=== Argument from conception ===
Another argument for the substance theory is the argument from conception. The argument claims that in order to conceive of an object's properties, like the redness of an apple, one must conceive of the object that has those properties. According to the argument, one cannot conceive of redness, or any other property, distinct from the substance that has that property.

== Criticism ==
The idea of substance was famously critiqued by David Hume, who held that since substance cannot be perceived, it should not be assumed to independently exist.

Friedrich Nietzsche, and after him Martin Heidegger, Michel Foucault and Gilles Deleuze also rejected the notion of "substance", and in the same movement the concept of subject –seeing both concepts as holdovers from Platonic idealism. For this reason, Althusser's "anti-humanism" and Foucault's statements were criticized, by Jürgen Habermas and others, for misunderstanding that this led to a fatalist conception of social determinism. For Habermas, only a subjective form of liberty could be conceived, to the contrary of Deleuze who talks about "a life", as an impersonal and immanent form of liberty.

For Heidegger, Descartes means by "substance" that by which "we can understand nothing else than an entity which is in such a way that it need no other entity in order to be." Therefore, only God is a substance as Ens perfectissimus (most perfect being). Heidegger showed the inextricable relationship between the concept of substance and of subject, which explains why, instead of talking about "man" or "humankind", he speaks about the Dasein, which is not a simple subject, nor a substance.

Alfred North Whitehead has argued that the concept of substance has only a limited applicability in everyday life and that metaphysics should rely upon the concept of process.

Roman Catholic theologian Karl Rahner, as part of his critique of transubstantiation, rejected substance theory and instead proposed the doctrine of transfinalization, which he felt was more attuned to modern philosophy. However, this doctrine was rejected by Pope Paul VI in his encyclical Mysterium fidei.

== Bundle theory ==
In direct opposition to substance theory is bundle theory, whose most basic premise is that all concrete particulars are merely constructions or 'bundles' of attributes or qualitative properties:

Necessarily, for any concrete entity, $a$, if for any entity, $b$, $b$ is a constituent of $a$, then $b$ is an attribute.

The bundle theorist's principal objections to substance theory concern the bare particulars of a substance, which substance theory considers independently of the substance's properties. The bundle theorist objects to the notion of a thing with no properties, claiming that such a thing is inconceivable and citing John Locke, who described a substance as "a something, I know not what." To the bundle theorist, as soon as one has any notion of a substance in mind, a property accompanies that notion.

=== Identity of indiscernibles counterargument ===
The indiscernibility argument from the substance theorist targets those bundle theorists who are also metaphysical realists. Metaphysical realism uses the identity of universals to compare and identify particulars. Substance theorists say that bundle theory is incompatible with metaphysical realism due to the identity of indiscernibles: particulars may differ from one another only with respect to their attributes or relations.

The substance theorist's indiscernibility argument against the metaphysically realistic bundle theorist states that numerically different concrete particulars are discernible from the self-same concrete particular only by virtue of qualitatively different attributes.

Necessarily, for any complex objects, $a$ and $b$, if for any entity, $c$, $c$ is a constituent of $a$ if and only if $c$ is a constituent of $b$, then $a$ is numerically identical with $b$.

The indiscernibility argument points out that if bundle theory and discernible concrete particulars theory explain the relationship between attributes, then the identity of indiscernibles theory must also be true:

Necessarily, for any concrete objects, $a$ and $b$, if for any attribute, Φ, Φ is an attribute of $a$ if and only if Φ is an attribute of $b$, then $a$ is numerically identical with $b$.

The indiscernibles argument then asserts that the identity of indiscernibles is violated, for example, by identical sheets of paper. All of their qualitative properties are the same (e.g. white, rectangular, 9 x 11 inches...) and thus, the argument claims, bundle theory and metaphysical realism cannot both be correct.

However, bundle theory combined with trope theory (as opposed to metaphysical realism) avoids the indiscernibles argument because each attribute is a trope if can only be held by only one concrete particular.

The argument does not consider whether "position" should be considered an attribute or relation. It is after all through the differing positions that we in practice differentiate between otherwise identical pieces of paper.

== Religious philosophy ==
=== Christianity ===
The Christian writers of antiquity adhered to the Aristotelian conception of substance. Their peculiarity was the use of this idea for the discernment of theological nuances. Clement of Alexandria considered both material and spiritual substances: blood and milk; mind and soul, respectively. Origen may be the first theologian expressing Christ's similarity with the Father as consubstantiality. Tertullian professed the same view in the West. The ecclesiastics of the Cappadocian group (Basil of Caesarea, Gregory of Nazianzus, Gregory of Nyssa) taught that the Trinity had a single substance in three hypostases individualized by the relations among them. In later ages, the meaning of "substance" became more important because of the dogma of the Eucharist. Hildebert of Lavardin, archbishop of Tours, introduced the term transubstantiation about 1080; its use spread after the Fourth Council of the Lateran in 1215.

According to Thomas Aquinas, beings may possess substance in three different modes. Together with other Medieval philosophers, he interpreted God's epithet "El Shaddai" (Genesis 17:1) as self-sufficient and concluded that God's essence was identical with existence. Aquinas also deemed the substance of spiritual creatures identical with their essence (or form); therefore he considered each angel to belong to its own distinct species. In Aquinas' view, composite substances consist of form and matter. Human substantial form, i.e. soul, receives its individuality from body.

=== Buddhism ===
Buddhism rejects the concept of substance. Complex structures are comprehended as an aggregate of components without any essence. Just as the junction of parts is called cart, so the collections of elements are called things. All formations are unstable (aniccā) and lacking any constant core or "self" (anattā). Physical objects have no metaphysical substrate. Arising entities hang on previous ones conditionally: in the notable teaching on interdependent origination, effects arise not as caused by agents but conditioned by former situations. Our senses, perception, feelings, wishes and consciousness are flowing, the view satkāya-dṛṣṭi of their permanent carrier is rejected as fallacious. The school of Madhyamaka, namely Nāgārjuna, introduced the idea of the ontological void (śūnyatā). The Buddhist metaphysics Abhidharma presumes particular forces which determine the origin, persistence, aging and decay of everything in the world. Vasubandhu added a special force making a human, called "aprāpti" or "pṛthagjanatvam". Because of the absence of a substantial soul, the belief in personal immortality loses foundation. Instead of deceased beings, new ones emerge whose fate is destined by the karmic law. The Buddha admitted the empirical identity of persons testified by their birth, name, and age. He approved the authorship of deeds and responsibility of performers. The disciplinary practice in the Sangha including reproaches, confession and expiation of transgressions, requires continuing personalities as its justification.

== See also ==
- History of chemistry
- History of molecular theory
- Hypokeimenon
- Inherence
- Materialism
- Sortal
- Transcendentals
