= Apriorism =

Philosophical position

Apriorism (sometimes a priorism or a-priorism) in modern times, refers to epistemological positions that assume that certain knowledge can be justified without reference to experience, or, in a narrower sense, that knowledge is entirely possible without any experience. The truth of statements is to be proven by logical deduction from true premises. Only those presuppositions come into question that can be regarded as necessities of reason independent of any experience. Critics accuse apriorism of committing a “petitio principii”, i.e. proving something that is already assumed to be true. Johann August Heinrich Ulrich – a contemporary of Immanuel Kant and professor of philosophy in Jena – criticized Kant's a priorism in this sense. Kant maintained that his philosophy was firmly based on a priori categories and concepts.

== Characteristics of apriorism ==
The apriorism of modern times stands in the tradition of rationalism. Only eternal truths and their consequences, which have their sufficient reason in evident axioms or other a priori valid statements and thus find an ultimate justification, come into question as true statements. In addition to Euclidean geometry, Immanuel Kant's Critique of Pure Reason provided the model for this view. The latter is seen by many as a response to David Hume's criticism of apriorism.

Among other things, Hume considered causality to be a questionable idea. Causality cannot be observed, he said. It is an assumption that people make out of habit. It could not be decided philosophically whether causal relationships were true. Kant attempted to save the principle of causality through an a priori justification. Causality – he replied – was an a priori, i.e. unquestionable category of human thought that people spontaneously applied in order to recognize causal relationships. Among other things, Kant was guided by Newtonian physics, for which causality was considered a priori in his time. Since then, physics has repeatedly changed its theories so that Kant's conviction is no longer supported in this way by the state and development of the natural sciences.

== Ancient and medieval apriorism ==
Plato's theory of ideas was a priori. He assumed that human knowledge presupposes objective ideas that are spontaneously recalled and thus enable true knowledge. Historians of philosophy refer to this as the theory of Anamnesis. According to Plato, objective ideas produce true knowledge through man's participation (μέθεξις) in the absolute.

The late antique church father Augustine introduced the term abditum mentis (“hiding place of the mind” or “the hiddenness of the mind”). He used this term to describe an area in the depths of the human mind, the content of which is supposed to be an a priori knowledge that is considered the basis of thought and all knowledge. According to Augustine's theory, the “hidden depth of our memory” is the place where people find content that does not come from their stored memories, but which they think for the first time. In thinking, an insight appears that comes from an insight that was already in the memory before, but was hidden there.

According to Thomas Aquinas, the human mind is connected to the divine spirit. This is how humans gain knowledge about the order of the world (including the laws of nature) that goes beyond experience.

== Aprioristic positions ==
At the beginning of the modern era, René Descartes pursued a priori philosophizing. His demand to start thinking from “clear and definite observations” works if people can start from “clear and definite ideas”. This results in true knowledge. Another indication of apriorism is the mathematical-geometric character of his thinking. For Descartes, everything that can be deduced from other things that are known with certainty must necessarily be true. Gottfried Wilhelm Leibniz mentioned the “original beginnings of various concepts and theorems which external objects awaken in the soul only on occasion”. He called them “intelligible contents of the mind”. He agreed with Plato that these universal concepts or eternal entities have a higher reality than the individual things that can be perceived by the senses. Everything was completely true if interpreted correctly.Georg Wilhelm Friedrich Hegel postulated the absolute world spirit and objective logic. They unfold dialectically. Both are a priori given. The world spirit philosophizes through Hegel. Hegel is convinced of this.Herbert Spencer advocated an apriorism of the idea of progress and sociocultural evolution. His a priori truths and values describe generic experiences. They are the motor for the constant further and higher development of man and thus guarantee progress. This can be seen in the development of culture and civilization.

Apriorism was represented in a more or less explicit form by Neo-Kantianism and by Jakob Friedrich Fries through to Husserl, whereby Kant's position, which itself fluctuated in detail between metatheory and psychology, was in part strongly reformulated or weakened.

Marxists accept a relative apriorism. The bodily preconditions – senses and organs – are the result of a long historical process. Every human being experiences them as something given, in this sense they are a priori. This is also relatively a priori: People grow into a world in which there is already knowledge that the individual has not made himself. This also applies to scientific theories in a similar way. They are found and applied a priori, as it were.

In economics, Ludwig von Mises emerged as the representative of an economic theory which, as an a priori science, was on the same level as logic and mathematics. Friedrich August von Hayek, on the other hand, considers empirical statements about knowing and acting individuals to be essential in economics alongside the “pure logic of voting”, which only permit ideal-typical causal explanations.

== Criticism of aprioristic positions ==
Ernst Cassirer, like Karl Popper later on, takes account of the criticism of a priorism by reinterpreting the principle of causality as a postulate of methodology: the search for regularities (without intending a corresponding metaphysical assertion). Finally, Hans Albert calls for epistemology to be freed from apriorism by interpreting the theory of cognition as metaphysical and empirical hypotheses.

Friedrich Engels introduced the “Philosophy” section of the Anti-Dühring with the chapter “Apriorism”. The “aprioristic method” is criticized, "not to recognize the properties of an object from the object itself, but to derive them from the concept of the object as evidence. First you make the concept of the object out of the object; then you turn the tables and measure the object by its image, the concept. It is not the concept that should now be based on the object, but the object that should be based on the concept."

Max Weber criticized Rudolf Stammler for bending the materialist view of history to an apriorism in which “natural laws and logical norms swim into one another,” a scholasticism that fell far behind Kant.

Hans Albert cites anthropological studies such as those by Arnold Gehlen as an argument against the “strange view” that human action can be captured and analyzed by an a priori theory without the aid of empirical knowledge.

Karl Popper stated that representatives of a priorism – Kant and Fries – are unable to show how (in relation to the justification of the principle of induction) a non-aprioristic standpoint differs from an a prioristic one. No conclusive proof is provided. Rather, they start from the “dogmatic presupposition” that there is an “a priori valid principle of induction”. This petitio principii is concealed by the derivation of “certain a priori principles”, in which the assumption of the a priori valid principle of induction is already contained. Neither Kant's claim that these a priori presuppositions are “intersubjectively” verifiable, nor Fries' assertion that they can be grasped through “intellectual intuition” (intellektuelle Anschauung) is suitable to provide corresponding proof.

For fallibilism, the main objection is that this type of justification strategy, in order to justify the absolute truth of statements in accordance with its objective, chooses the weakest tested or testable basis of all.

== Literature ==
- Edmund Abb: Kritik des Kantschen Apriorismus vom Standpunkte des reinen Empirismus aus: unter besonderer Berṳcksichtigung von J. St. Mill und Mach. Leipzig 1906. Digitalisiert Princeton University 2008.
- Werner Trautner: Der Apriorismus der Wissensformen: eine Studie zur Wissenssoziologie Max Schelers. München 1969.
- Grigoriĭ Iosifovich Patent, Gottfried Handel, Wilfried Lehrke: Marxismus und Apriorismus. Studien zur Erkenntnistheorie. Berlin 1977.
- Johann Christoph Gottsched: Ausgewählte Werke: Kleinere Schriften, Erster Teil, Band 10;Band 12. Berlin 1980.
- Universität Bremen. Zentrum Philosophische Grundlagen der Wissenschaften: Zum Problem des Apriorismus in den Wissenschaften: eine Ringvorlesung. Pressestelle Uni Bremen, 1986.
- Hans Albert: Kritik der reinen Erkenntnislehre. Mohr: Tübingen 1987. ISBN 3-16-945229-0
- Renate Wahsner: Erkenntnistheoretischer Apriorismus und neuzeitliche Physik. Deutsche Zeitschrift für Philosophie 40/1992, S. 23–35.
- Karl R. Popper: Die beiden Grundprobleme der Erkenntnistheorie. Aufgrund von Manuskripten aus den Jahren 1930–1933. Tübingen 2. verbess. Auflage 1994
- Ernst Cassirer: Determinismus und Indeterminismus in der modernen Physik. Historische und systematische Studien zum Kausalproblem. [Göteborg 1937], Neuausgabe: Gesammelte Werke, Band 19, Meiner, Hamburg 2004, ISBN 978-3-7873-1419-5
- Moritz Schlick: Erkenntnistheorie und moderne Physik. In: Johannes Friedl & Heiner Rutte: Moritz Schlick. Die Wiener Zeit: Aufsätze, Beiträge, Rezensionen 1926–1936. New York/Wien 2008, S. 157–174.
- Emil Sigall: Der Leibniz-Kantische Apriorismus und die neuere Philosophie. Charleston/United States (NABU-Press, Books On Demand) 2011.
- Benedikt Bärwolf: Die „angeborenen Ideen“ bei Platon und Leibniz. Hamburg 2012.
