= Géraud de Cordemoy =

French philosopher

Géraud de Cordemoy (French: [ʒeʁo də kɔʁdəmwa]; 6 October 1626 – 15 October 1684) was a French philosopher, historian and lawyer. He is mainly known for his works in metaphysics and for his theory of language.

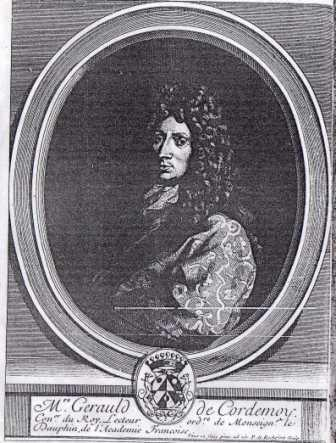
Portrait of Géraud de Cordemoy in the 1704 edition of the complete works

== Biography ==
Géraud de Cordemoy was a member of a family of ancient nobility originating from Auvergne (from the town of Royat), but was born and died in Paris. He was the third of four children. His father was a master in arts at the University of Paris named Géraud de Cordemoy who died when he was nine years old. His mother was named Nicole de Cordemoy. As for Géraud, he was a private tutor and a linguist and practised as a lawyer.

Géraud de Cordemoy used to haunt the philosophical circles of the capital; he made acquaintance with Emmanuel Maignan and Jacques Rohault. A friend and a protégé of Bossuet who admired Descartes too, Géraud de Cordemoy was appointed lecteur (tutor) to the Dauphin (son of King Louis XIV), at the same time as Fléchier. He was elected a member of Académie Française in 1675.

== Works ==
Cordemoy is known primarily for having rethought the Cartesian theory of causality, introducing the notion of "occasional cause" within a system of thought which remains essentially Cartesian. He was, alongside Arnold Geulincx and Louis de La Forge, the founder of what is called "occasionalism". Body and soul are distinct by essence, their combination is occasional, and it is God who allows that the will to move my arm, for example, is translated into a movement. My will is an occasional cause of the movement of my arm, God is the real cause of it. What is true for the body – an individual constituted by the distinct combination of body and soul – is true for every body in the universe. God is the real and universal cause of every movement.

By body, Cordemoy means the ultimate components of matter. Using a judicial figure of speech, he shows that the body, in law a person, in physics an ultimate component of matter, is indivisible. Never mentioning atomism, with that theory he comes close to the followers of Gassendi and to the free thinkers, the so-called Libertines. In his work "Le discernement du corps et de l’âme" (Discrimination between body and soul) he develops such thoughts which were criticized at that time by the followers of Descartes.

In his work Discours physique de la parole (Physical Discourse on Speech), he asks himself the following question: "How can I, as a thinking being, be certain that the human beings who surround me are also thinking beings, and not simple automatons? The problem is considered at the end of the sixth speech on discrimination between body and soul. It is the word as a vehicle of the thought which will enable me to know the existence of other individuals who are endowed with a soul like me." In a more original way, in his work "Traité physique de la parole" (physical treatise of the word) – a variation of the previous title – he develops the notion that no motivated relation between the material sign and the expressed idea exists, as much as no real relation exists between body and soul. The word represents the opportunity for sign and meaning to meet, so far as if the soul hadn't the use of the articulated body to produce sign, it would communicate in a much more immediate way from soul to soul, without having to go through the institution of the sign.

The language used by human beings is therefore too complex to be explained by purely mechanical causes; I can deduce from it that the bodies I can see are also endowed with a soul. Animals may utter sounds and parrots may reproduce words, only human beings are able to communicate ideas, and that shows the presence of a rational soul. This rational soul is able to communicate directly with angels without going through the physical articulation of the sign. Le Discours, from which Molière drew the scene of the spelling lesson in Le Bourgeois gentilhomme, remains the most successful work of Cordemoy. American linguists such as George Boas and Noam Chomsky rediscovered him during the sixties.

Cordemoy is also known for his Histoire de France on which he worked for 18 years without ever seeing the end, so major were the contradictions he came up against while consulting the works of his predecessors. The work was finally finished by his elder son, Louis-Géraud de Cordemoy, and published after his death. Voltaire said of the work of Cordemoy as a historian : "He was the first to be able to disentangle the chaos of the two first races of the kings of France; thanks to the duke of Montausier who charged Cordemoy with the writing of the history of Charlemagne in view of the education of Monseigneur [the Dauphin], that useful work was achieved. He found in ancient authors nothing but absurdities and contradictions. That very difficulty encouraged him, and enabled him to disentangle the two first races".

== Publications ==
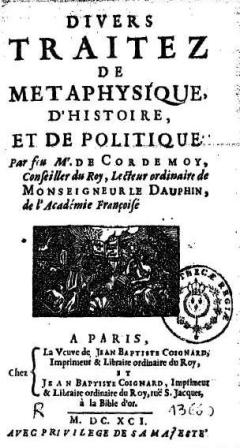
1691 edition of the political and historical works of Géraud de Cordemoy

- Discours de l’action des corps (1664)
- Traité de l'esprit de l'homme et de ses facultez et fonctions, et de son union avec le corps. Suivant les principes de René Descartes (1666)
- Le discernement du corps et de l'âme, en six discours, pour servir à l'éclaircissement de la physique (1666). Online text
- Discours physique de la parole (1668). Online text
- Copie d'une lettre écrite à un sçavant religieux de la Compagnie de Jésus, pour montrer : I, que le système de M. Descartes et son opinion touchant les bestes n'ont rien de dangereux; II, et que tout ce qu'il en a écrit semble estre tiré du premier chapitre de la Genèse (1668). Online text
- Lettre d'un philosophe à un cartesien de ses amis (1672)
- Discours sur la pureté de l'esprit et du corps et par occasion de la vie innocente et juste des premiers Chrétiens (1677)
- Histoire de France, depuis le temps des Gaulois et le commencement de la monarchie, jusqu'en 987 (2 volumes, 1687–89). Complétée et publiée par son fils, Louis-Géraud de Cordemoy.
- Dissertations physiques sur le discernement du corps et de l'âme, sur la parole, et sur le système de M. Descartes (1689–90)
- Divers traitez de métaphysique, d'histoire et de politique (1691). Online text
- Geraud de Cordemoy, A Philosophical Discourse Concerning Speech, London, 1668. Facsimile ed., with A Discourse Written to a Learned Frier (1670), introd. by Barbara Ross, 1972, Scholars' Facsimiles & Reprints, ISBN 978-0-8201-1106-3.
- Les Œuvres de feu monsieur de Cordemoy (1704). Publiées par son fils, Louis-Géraud de Cordemoy. Contiennent : Six discours sur la distinction et l'union des corps; Discours physique sur la Parole; Lettre sur la conformité du système de Descartes avec le premier chapitre de la Genèse; Deux petits traités de métaphysique; Divers petits traités sur l'histoire et sur la métaphysique; Divers petits traités sur l'histoire et sur la politique.
- Pierre Clair et François Girbal (eds.), Gérauld de Cordemoy (1626-1684). Œuvres philosophiques. Avec une étude bio-bibliographique, Presses Universitaires de France, Paris, 1968
