= Phenomenalism =

Metaphysical view that physical objects only exist as sensory stimuli

In metaphysics, phenomenalism is the view that physical objects cannot justifiably be said to exist as "things-in-themselves", but only as perceptual phenomena or sensory stimuli (e.g. redness, hardness, softness, sweetness, etc.) situated in time and in space. In particular, some forms of phenomenalism reduce all talk about physical objects in the external world to talk about bundles of sense data.

== History ==
Phenomenalism is a radical form of empiricism. Its roots as an ontological view of the nature of existence can be traced back to George Berkeley and his subjective idealism, upon which David Hume further elaborated. John Stuart Mill had a theory of perception which is commonly referred to as classical phenomenalism. This differs from Berkeley's idealism in its account of how objects continue to exist when no one is perceiving them. Berkeley claimed that an omniscient God perceived all objects and that this was what kept them in existence, whereas Mill claimed that permanent possibilities of experience were sufficient for an object's existence. These permanent possibilities could be analysed into counterfactual conditionals, such as "if I were to have y-type sensations, then I would also have x-type sensations".

As an epistemological theory about the possibility of knowledge of objects in the external world, however, the most accessible formulation of phenomenalism is perhaps to be found in the transcendental idealism of Immanuel Kant. According to Kant, space and time, which are the a priori forms and preconditions of all sensory experience, "refer to objects only to the extent that these are considered as phenomena, but do not represent the things in themselves". While Kant insisted that knowledge is limited to phenomena, he never denied or excluded the existence of objects which were not knowable by way of experience, the things-in-themselves or noumena, though his proof of noumena had many problems and is one of the most controversial aspects of his Critiques.

Kant's "epistemological phenomenalism", as it has been called, is therefore quite distinct from Berkeley's earlier ontological version. In Berkeley's view, the so-called "things-in-themselves" do not exist except as subjectively perceived bundles of sensations which are guaranteed consistency and permanence because they are constantly perceived by the mind of God. Hence, while Berkeley holds that objects are merely bundles of sensations (see bundle theory), Kant holds (unlike other bundle theorists) that objects do not cease to exist when they are no longer perceived by some merely human subject or mind.

In the late 19th century, an even more extreme form of phenomenalism was formulated by Ernst Mach, later developed and refined by Russell, Ayer and the logical positivists. Mach rejected the existence of God and also denied that phenomena were data experienced by the mind or consciousness of subjects. Instead, Mach held sensory phenomena to be "pure data" whose existence was to be considered anterior to any arbitrary distinction between mental and physical categories of phenomena. In this way, it was Mach who formulated the key thesis of phenomenalism, which separates it from bundle theories of objects: objects are logical constructions out of sense-data or ideas; whereas according to bundle theories, objects are made up of sets, or bundles, of actual ideas or perceptions.

That is, according to bundle theory, to say that the pear before me exists is simply to say that certain properties (greenness, hardness, etc.) are being perceived at this moment. When these characteristics are no longer perceived or experienced by anyone, then the object (pear, in this case) no longer exists. Phenomenalism as formulated by Mach, in contrast, is the view that objects are logical constructions out of perceptual properties. On this view, to say there is a table in the other room when there is no one in that room to perceive it, is to say that if there were someone in that room, then that person would perceive the table. It is not the actual perception that counts, but the conditional possibility of perceiving.

Logical positivism, a movement begun as a small circle which grew around the philosopher Moritz Schlick in Vienna, inspired many philosophers in the English speaking world from the 1930s through the 1950s. Important influences on their brand of empiricism included Ernst Mach — himself holding the Chair of Inductive Sciences at the University of Vienna, a position Schlick would later hold — and the Cambridge philosopher Bertrand Russell. The idea of some logical positivists, such as A. J. Ayer and Rudolf Carnap, was to apply phenomenalism in linguistic terms, enabling reliable discourse of physical objects, such as tables, in strict terms of either actual or possible sensory experiences.

20th century American philosopher Arthur Danto asserted that "a phenomenalist, believ[es] that whatever is finally meaningful can be expressed in terms of our own [sense] experience.". He claimed that "The phenomenalist really is committed to the most radical kind of empiricism: For him reference to objects is always finally a reference to sense-experience ... ."

Following George Berkeley's lead, the 20th century Australian philosopher Colin Murray Turbayne also argued in favor of a robust form of phenomenalism by developing a "language model" as an alternative to the commonly accepted "geometric model" which underlies both the modern theory of visual sensation in particular and the classical mechanical philosophy in general.

To the phenomenalist, objects of any kind must be related to experience. "John Stuart Mill once spoke of physical objects as but the 'permanent possibility of experience' and this, by and large, is what the phenomenalist exploits: All we can mean, in talking about physical objects — or nonphysical objects, if there are any — is what experiences we would have in dealing with them ... ." However, phenomenalism is based on mental operations. These operations, themselves, are not known from sense experience. Such non-empirical, non-sensual operations are the "...nonempirical matters of space, time, and continuity that empiricism in all its forms and despite its structures seems to require ... ."

== Criticisms ==
C. I. Lewis had previously suggested that the physical claim "There is a doorknob in front of me" necessarily entails the sensory conditional "If I should seem to see a doorknob and if I should seem to myself to be initiating a grasping motion, then in all probability the sensation of contacting a doorknob should follow".

Roderick Firth formulated another objection in 1950, stemming from perceptual relativity: White wallpaper looks white under white light and red under red light, etc. Any possible course of experience resulting from a possible course of action will apparently underdetermine our surroundings: it would determine, for example, that there is either white wallpaper under red light or red wallpaper under white light, and so on.

Another criticism of phenomenalism comes from truthmaker theory. Truthmaker theorists hold that the truth depends on reality. In the terms of truthmaker theory: a truthbearer (e.g. a proposition) is true because of the existence of its truthmaker (e.g. a fact). Phenomenalists have been accused of violating this principle and thereby engaging in "ontological cheating": of positing truths without being able to account for the truthmakers of these truths. The criticism is usually directed at the phenomenalist account of material objects. The phenomenalist faces the problem of how to account for the existence of unperceived material objects. A well-known solution to this problem comes from John Stuart Mill. He claimed that we can account for unperceived objects in terms of counterfactual conditionals: It is true that valuables locked in a safe remain in existence, despite being unperceived, because if someone were to look inside then this person would have a corresponding sensory impression. Truthmaker theorist may object that this still leaves open what the truthmaker for this counterfactual conditional is, considering it unclear how such a truthmaker could be found within the phenomenalist ontology.

== Notable proponents ==
- Johannes Nikolaus Tetens
- John Foster
- Colin Murray Turbayne

== See also ==
- Peripatetic axiom
- Phenomenalistic idealism
- Sensualism

== Bibliography ==
- Fenomenismo in L'Enciclopedia Garzanti di Filosofia (eds.) Gianni Vattimo and Gaetano Chiurazzi. Third Edition. Garzanti. Milan, 2004. ISBN 88-11-50515-1
- Berlin, Isaiah. The Refutation of Phenomenalism. The Isaiah Berlin Virtual Library. 2004.
- Bolender, John. Factual Phenomenalism: a Supervenience Theory, in SORITES Issue #09. April 1998. pp. 16–31.
