= Dhati in islamic philosophy =

Dhati (Persian:ذاتی) or essential affairs is a prevalent conception in Islamic philosophy essential or Dhati attributes are those properties which originated from the thing and its essence. This attributes could separate one thing from other things.

== Concept ==
Dhati or something which is essential for a thing, applied in Islamic philosophy in opposition to Accidental property. Those things which are Dhati are definite description for separation of one thing from other things. Dhati in Islamic philosophy has three uses:

- Dhati in opposition to Accidental or Aradhi
- existential phenomena in opposition to essential phenomena
- celestial phenomena versus sublunary phenomena

This term also used as description for apprehension, creation. essential attribute is such that the described thing is along with it and is not outside of substance.

== Dhati in philosophical usage ==
According to Avicenna, essential phenomena are to those predicates maintain their subjects. If the essential phenomena disappeared then the essence would be demolished. These phenomena are such a way that the subject is dependent to them in its existence. Sometimes Muslim philosophers used essential phenomena as requisites of quiddities. These requisites predicates on quiddities as such, not in respect to their existence.

== See also ==
- Accident (philosophy)
