= Participation (philosophy) =

In philosophy, participation is the inverse of inherence.

== Overview ==
Accidents are said to inhere in substance. Substances, in turn, participate in their accidents. For example, the color red is said to inhere in the red apple. Conversely, the red apple participates in the color red.

Participation also is predicated by analogy to a dependence relations between accidents. Thus an act may be said to participate in time in the sense that every act must occur at some time. In a similar way, color may be said to inhere in space, meaning that a color occurs only on the surface of a body—and thus only in space.

Inherence, on the other hand, would not normally be predicated analogously of accidents.

== See also ==
- Substance theory
- Methexis
