= Hypokeimenon =

Term in metaphysics

Hypokeimenon (Greek: ὑποκείμενον), later often material substratum, is a term in metaphysics which literally means the "underlying thing" (Latin: subiectum).

To search for the hypokeimenon is to search for that substance that persists in a thing going through change—its basic essence.

== Overview ==
Aristotle defined a hypokeimenon in narrowly and purely grammatical terms, as something which cannot be a predicate of other things, but which can carry other things as its predicates.

The existence of a material substratum was posited by John Locke, with conceptual similarities to Baruch Spinoza's substance and Immanuel Kant's concept of the noumenon (in The Critique of Pure Reason).

Locke theorised that when all sensible properties were abstracted away from an object, such as its colour, weight, density or taste, there would still be something left to which the properties had adhered—something which allowed the object to exist independently of the sensible properties that it manifested in the beholder. Locke saw this ontological ingredient as necessary if one is to be able to consider objects as existing independently of one's own mind. The material substratum proved a difficult idea for Locke as by its very nature its existence could not be directly proven in the manner endorsed by empiricists (i.e., proof by exhibition in experience). Nevertheless, he believed that the philosophical reasons for it were strong enough for its existence to be considered proven.

The existence of the substratum was denied by Berkeley. In his Three Dialogues Between Hylas and Philonous, Berkeley maintained that an object consists of nothing more than those sensible properties (or possible sensible properties) that the object manifests, and that those sensible properties only exist so long as the act of perceiving them does.

== See also ==
- Bundle theory
- Haecceity
- Hypostasis (philosophy and religion)
- Noumenon
- Principle of individuation
- Quiddity
- Substance theory
- Thing-in-itself
