= Bundle theory =

Philosophical theory by David Hume

Bundle theory, originated by the 18th century Scottish philosopher David Hume, is the ontological theory about objecthood in which an object comprises a collection (bundle) of properties, relations or tropes.

According to bundle theory, an object consists of its properties and nothing more; thus, there cannot be an object without properties and one cannot conceive of such an object. For example, the thought of an apple brings to mind its properties: redness, roundness, being a type of fruit, etc. There is nothing above and beyond these properties; the apple is nothing more than the collection of its properties. In particular, there is no substance in which the properties are inherent.

Bundle theory has been contrasted with the ego theory of the self, which views the egoic self as a soul-like substance existing in the same manner as the corporeal self.

== Arguments in favor ==
The difficulty in conceiving and or describing an object without also conceiving and or describing its properties is a common justification for bundle theory, especially among current philosophers in the Anglo-American tradition.

The inability to comprehend any aspect of the thing other than its properties implies, this argument maintains, that one cannot conceive of a bare particular (a substance without properties), an implication that directly opposes substance theory. The conceptual difficulty of bare particulars was illustrated by John Locke when he described a substance by itself, apart from its properties as "something, I know not what. [...] The idea then we have, to which we give the general name substance, being nothing but the supposed, but unknown, support of those qualities we find existing, which we imagine cannot subsist sine re substante, without something to support them, we call that support substantia; which, according to the true import of the word, is, in plain English, standing under or upholding."

Whether a relation of an object is one of its properties may complicate such an argument. However, the argument concludes that the conceptual challenge of bare particulars leaves a bundle of properties and nothing more as the only possible conception of an object, thus justifying bundle theory.

== Objections ==
Bundle theory maintains that properties are bundled together in a collection without describing how they are tied together. For example, bundle theory regards an apple as red, four inches (100 mm) wide, and juicy but lacking an underlying substance. The apple is said to be a bundle of properties including redness, being four inches (100 mm) wide, and juiciness. Hume used the term "bundle" in this sense, also referring to the personal identity, in his main work: "I may venture to affirm of the rest of mankind, that they are nothing but a bundle or collection of different perceptions, which succeed each other with inconceivable rapidity, and are in a perpetual flux and movement".

Critics question how bundle theory accounts for the properties' compresence (the togetherness relation between those properties) without an underlying substance. Critics also question how any two given properties are determined to be properties of the same object if there is no substance in which they both inhere. This argument is done away with if one considers spatio-temporal location to be a property as well.

Traditional bundle theory explains the compresence of properties by defining an object as a collection of properties bound together. Thus, different combinations of properties and relations produce different objects. Redness and juiciness, for example, may be found together on top of the table because they are part of a bundle of properties located on the table, one of which is the "looks like an apple" property.

By contrast, substance theory explains the compresence of properties by asserting that the properties are found together because it is the substance that has those properties. In substance theory, a substance is the thing in which properties inhere. For example, redness and juiciness are found on top of the table because redness and juiciness inhere in an apple, making the apple red and juicy.

The bundle theory of substance explains compresence. Specifically, it maintains that properties' compresence itself engenders a substance. Thus, it determines substancehood empirically by the togetherness of properties rather than by a bare particular or by any other non-empirical underlying strata. The bundle theory of substance thus rejects the substance theories of Aristotle, Descartes, Leibniz, and more recently, J. P. Moreland, Jia Hou, Joseph Bridgman, Quentin Smith, and others.

== Buddhism ==
The Indian Madhyamaka philosopher, Chandrakirti, used the aggregate nature of objects to demonstrate the lack of essence in what is known as the sevenfold reasoning. In his work, Guide to the Middle Way (Sanskrit: Madhyamakāvatāra), he says:

[The self] is like a cart, which is not other than its parts, not non-other, and does not possess them. It is not within its parts, and its parts are not within it. It is not the mere collection, and it is not the shape.

He goes on to explain what is meant by each of these seven assertions, but briefly in a subsequent commentary he explains that the conventions of the world do not exist essentially when closely analyzed, but exist only through being taken for granted, without being subject to scrutiny that searches for an essence within them.

Another view of the Buddhist theory of the self, especially in early Buddhism, is that the Buddhist theory is essentially an eliminativist theory. According to this understanding, the self can not be reduced to a bundle because there is nothing that answers to the concept of a self. Consequently, the idea of a self must be eliminated.

== See also ==
- Humeanism § Bundle theory of the self
- Platonic realism
- Substance theory
