= Inherence =

Philosophical concept

Inherence refers to Empedocles' idea that the qualities of matter come from the relative proportions of each of the four elements entering into a thing. The idea was further developed by Plato and Aristotle.

== Overview ==
That Plato accepted (or at least did not reject) Empedocles' claim can be seen in the Timaeus. However, Plato also applied it to cover the presence of form in matter. The form is an active principle. Matter, on the other hand is passive, being a mere possibility that the forms bring to life.

Aristotle clearly accepted Empedocles' claim, but he rejected Plato's idea of the forms. According to Aristotle, the accidents of a substance are incorporeal beings which are present in it.

A closely related term is participation. If an attribute inheres in a subject, then the subject is said to participate in the attribute. For example, if the attribute in Athens inheres in Socrates, then Socrates is said to participate in the attribute, in Athens.

== See also ==
- Substance theory
