= Stewart Goetz =

American philosopher and writer

Stewart Goetz is an American philosopher and writer.

Goetz obtained a PhD in philosophy from the University of Notre Dame. He a professor in Philosophy and Religion at Ursinus College. He has defended substance dualism. Goetz is a member of the Board of Advisors for the Center on Culture and Civil Society at the Independent Institute. He has debated physicalist Andrew Melnyk on consciousness and free will at Internet Infidels.

== Selected publications ==
- Substance Dualism In The Ashgate Research Companion to Theological Anthropology (1991)
- Freedom, Teleology, and Evil (2008)
- Naturalism (with Charles Taliaferro, 2008)
- A Brief History of the Soul (with Charles Taliaferro, 2011)
- The Soul Hypothesis (with Mark Baker, 2011)
- The Routledge Companion to Theism (with Charles Taliaferro and Victoria Harrison, 2012)
- The Purpose of Life: A Theistic Perspective (2012)
- Free Will and Substance Dualism. In The Routledge Companion to Free Will (2016)
- Against Animalism In The Blackwell Companion to Substance Dualism (2018)
- C.S. Lewis (2018)
