= Howard Robinson =

- Born: 2 October 1945 (age 81)

Education
- Education: University of Oxford; University of Nottingham

Philosophical work
- Region: Western philosophy
- School: Analytic
- Main interests: Early modern philosophy; Philosophy of mind; Philosophy of perception

Howard Robinson (born 2 October 1945) is a British philosopher, specialising in various areas of philosophy of mind and metaphysics, best known for his work in the philosophy of perception. His contributions to philosophy include a defense of sense-datum theories of perception and a variety of arguments against physicalism about the mind. He published an alternative version of the popular knowledge argument in his book Matter and Sense independently and in the same year as Frank Jackson, but Robinson's thought experiment involves sounds rather than colors. He is Professor of Philosophy at Central European University and recurring visiting professor at Rutgers University.

== Education and qualifications ==
Robinson received his early education at the Manchester Grammar School (1957–1964), going up to the University of Oxford to read P.P.E. at Corpus Christi College (where he earned an Exhibition), graduating in 1967. He read for a research M.Phil. at the University of Nottingham (1968–1968), and continued postgraduate research at Corpus Christi College (1968–1970). In 2000, he was awarded a Ph.D. by the University of Liverpool for his published work (a "Staff Doctorate").

== Positions held ==
After four years at Oriel College, Oxford as full-time stipendiary lecturer in philosophy (1970–1974), he took up a lectureship at the University of Liverpool. He stayed at Liverpool for twenty-six years, becoming first Senior Lecturer then reader, apart from a period as Soros Professor of Philosophy at Eötvös Loránd University, Budapest, Hungary (1994–1996). In 2000, he was appointed Professor of Philosophy at the Central European University in Hungary. In autumn 2012, he was Professor of Philosophy at Rutgers University, New Brunswick. He is currently Professor of Philosophy at Central European University in Vienna and Budapest and recurring visiting professor at Rutgers University. He teaches graduate seminars on philosophy of mind and philosophy of perception at both institutions.

Since 1996, he has been a member of the East European committee of the European Society for Analytic Philosophy (ESAP), since 1999 a member of the Steering Committee of ESAP, and since 2002 a member of the Senate of the Central European University.

== Philosophy of mind ==
Robinson advocated philosophical dualism in his book From the Knowledge Argument to Mental Substance: Resurrecting the Mind, published in 2016. He is the editor of Contemporary Dualism: A Defense.

In 2022, he defended a type of idealism in his book Perception and Idealism.

== Bibliography ==
=== Books ===
- 1982: Matter and Sense: a Critique of Contemporary Materialism, Cambridge Studies in Philosophy (Cambridge: Cambridge University Press)
- 1994: Perception (London: Routledge) [paperback 2001]
- 2016: From the Knowledge Argument to Mental Substance: Resurrecting the Mind (Cambridge: Cambridge University Press)
- 2022: Perception and Idealism, (Oxford: Oxford University Press)

Edited collections

- 1985: Essays on Berkeley: a Tercentennial Celebration, co-edited with John Foster (Oxford: Clarendon Press) [paperback 1988]
- 1991: The Pursuit of Mind, co-edited with Raymond Tallis (Manchester: Carcanet Press)
- 1991: Aristotle and the Later Tradition (Oxford Studies in Ancient Philosophy, Supp. Vol. 2), co-edited with Henry Blumenthal (Oxford: Clarendon Press)
- 1993: Objections to Physicalism (Oxford: Clarendon Press) [paperback 1996]
- 1996: Berkeley's Principles and Three Dialogues (Oxford: Oxford University Press)

=== Articles ===
- Robinson, Howard (January 2020). "Semantic Direct Realism". American Philosophical Quarterly. 57 (1): 51–64. doi:10.2307/48570645. JSTOR 48570645.
- Robinson, Howard (January 2021). "Reply to Timothy Hinton on Gareth Moore's Philosophy of God". New Blackfriars. 102 (1097): 22–29. doi:10.1111/nbfr.12626.
