= Res extensa =

Cartesian metaphysical concept

Res extensa is one of the two substances described by René Descartes in his Cartesian ontology (often referred to as "radical dualism"), alongside res cogitans. Translated from Latin, "res extensa" means "extended thing" while the latter is described as "a thinking and unextended thing". Descartes often translated res extensa as "corporeal substance" but it is something that only God can create.

== Res extensa vs. res cogitans ==
Res extensa and res cogitans are mutually exclusive and this makes it possible to conceptualize the complete intellectual independence from the body. Res cogitans is also referred to as the soul and is related by thinkers such as Aristotle in his De Anima to the indefinite realm of potentiality. On the other hand, res extensa, are entities described by the principles of logic and are considered in terms of definiteness. Due to the polarity of these two concepts, the natural science focused on res extensa.

In the Cartesian view, the distinction between these two concepts is a methodological necessity driven by a distrust of the senses and the res extensa as it represents the entire material world. The categorical separation of these two, however, caused a problem, which can be demonstrated in this question: How can a wish (a mental event), cause an arm movement (a physical event)? Descartes has not provided any answer to this but Gottfried Leibniz proposed that it can be addressed by endowing each geometrical point in the res extensa with mind. Each of these points is within res extensa but they are also dimensionless, making them unextended.

In Descartes' substance–attribute–mode ontology, extension is the primary attribute of corporeal substance. He describes a piece of wax in the Second Meditation (see Wax argument). A solid piece of wax has certain sensory qualities. However, when the wax is melted, it loses every single apparent quality it had in its solid form. Still, Descartes recognizes in the melted substance the idea of wax.

== See also ==
- Mind-body dualism
