= John Foster (philosopher) =

English idealist philosopher (1941–2009)

- Born: John Andrew Foster; 5 May 1941; London, England
- Died: 1 January 2009 (aged 67); London, England

Education
- Education: Lincoln College, Oxford
- Doctoral advisor: A. J. Ayer

Philosophical work
- Era: Contemporary philosophy
- Region: Western philosophy
- School: Analytic philosophy
- Institutions: Brasenose College, Oxford
- Main interests: Metaphysics
- Notable ideas: Phenomenalistic idealism

John Andrew Foster (5 May 1941 – 1 January 2009) was a British philosopher and tutorial Fellow of Brasenose College, Oxford, from 1966 to 2005 (and then an Emeritus Fellow until his death in 2009). He authored several books, including The Case for Idealism (1982) and A World for Us: The Case for Phenomenalistic Idealism (2008). His A. J. Ayer (1985) was described by Anthony Quinton as "the only serious monograph" about Ayer's philosophy.

== Biography ==
Foster was born in North London on 5 May 1941 and grew up in Southgate. He studied at Mercers' School, but had to transfer to the City of London School to do A-levels after Mercers' closure (about which he wrote a letter to The Times in protest). He started studying classics at Lincoln College, Oxford, but transferred to psychology, philosophy and physiology after discovering a distaste for studying ancient history. Foster stayed a further year at Lincoln, after obtaining a First in 1964, and began a D.Phil. The support of his doctoral supervisor, A. J. Ayer, ensured Foster’s election to a Stone-Platt Junior Research Fellowship at New College in 1965 and, a year later, to his tutorial Fellowship at Brasenose. He retained this position until ill health finally forced his early retirement, as a "Mr" in 2005. (As Peter J. N. Sinclair notes, most Brasenose Arts tutors of Foster's generation, never completed a doctoral thesis).

Foster was a devoted Christian and an outspoken pro-life campaigner. Foster met his wife-to-be Helen in 1963 and the two married in Royal Tunbridge Wells in 1967. He joined the Church of England. In 1989 both John and Helen converted from Anglicanism to Roman Catholicism.

Foster died on 1 January 2009.

== Philosophical work ==
Foster's book The Case for Idealism has been described as a "leading assault on the reality of the physical world by a respected analytic philosopher". He argued against analytic reductionism.

In his book The Immaterial Self: A Defence of Cartesian Dualist Conception of the Mind, Foster defended Cartesian dualist arguments but ended supporting an idealistic conception of the mind, similar to George Berkeley's view. Charles Taliaferro has commented that "some idealists, such as the late, great Berkeleyan John Foster, have defended Cartesian dualism as a kind of provisional or conditional position: given that there are mind-independent physical objects and processes, Foster argued that we have good reason for not identifying the mental and the physical".

His 2002 paper A Defense of Dualism defined dualism as "the thesis that the mind and its contents are radically nonphysical". Under this definition, he argued that dualism is compatible with idealism.

In his 2008 book A World for Us: The Case for Phenomenalistic Idealism, he put forward a thesis called phenomenalistic idealism, which combines phenomenalism and idealism. The book is dedicated to George Berkeley. Foster's arguments against physical realism for Berkleyan idealism influenced Howard Robinson.

== Works ==
=== Books authored ===
- (1982) The Case for Idealism. Routledge & Kegan Paul, London. ISBN 0-7100-9019-6.
- (1985) A. J. Ayer. Routledge & Kegan Paul, Boston. ISBN 0415203899.
- (1991) The Immaterial Self: A Defence of the Cartesian Dualist Conception of Mind. Routledge, New York. ISBN 9780415156332.
- (2000) The Nature of Perception. Oxford University Press, Oxford. ISBN 978-0198237693.
- (2004) The Divine Lawmaker: Lectures on Induction, Laws of Nature, and the Existence of God. Oxford University Press, Oxford. ISBN 978-0199250592.
- (2008) A World for Us: The Case for Phenomenalistic Idealism. Oxford University Press, Oxford. ISBN 0-19-929713-4

=== Select papers/chapters ===
- (1976) "Meaning and Truth Theory" in: Gareth Evans, John McDowell (eds.) Truth and Meaning: Essays in Semantics Oxford
- (1985) "Berkeley on the physical world" In John Foster & Howard Robinson (eds.), Essays on Berkeley: A Tercentennial Celebration. Oxford University Press.
- (1985) "Personhood and the Ethics of Abortion" in: (ed.). J. H. Channer, Abortion and the Sanctity of Human Life, Paternoster Press,
- (1992) "The Construction of the Physical World." In L. E. Hahn (ed.), The Philosophy of A J Ayer. Open Court.
- (1993) "The Succinct Case for Idealism." In Howard Robinson (ed.), Objections to Physicalism. Clarendon Press. pp. 293–313.
