= Open Theology =

- Discipline: Religious studies
- Language: English
- Edited by: Charles Taliaferro

Publication details
- History: 2015–present
- Publisher: Walter de Gruyter

Standard abbreviations
- ISO 4: Open Theol.

Indexing
- ISSN: 2300-6579
- OCLC no.: 953386618

Links
- Journal homepage

Open Theology is a peer-reviewed open access academic journal published by De Gruyter since 2015. It covers theology and religious studies. The editor-in-chief is Charles Taliaferro (St. Olaf College).

== Abstracting and indexing ==
The journal is abstracted and indexed in EBSCO databases, Emerging Sources Citation Index, ERIH PLUS, and Scopus.
