= Genetically modified sperm =

Genetically modified sperm (GM sperm) is sperm that has undergone genetic modification for biomedical purposes, including the elimination of genetic diseases or infertility. Although the procedure has been tested on animals such as fish, pigs, and rabbits, it remains relatively untested on humans. In the case of pigs, the goal of research is to inexpensively produce organs and supplement the shortage of donated human organs. Although GM sperm has the potential to detect and treat genetic diseases, it will likely take many years for successful use in patients.

== Process ==
In genetic modification, genes are inserted into living cells in order to change how proteins are created. A viral vector is often used to deliver the gene of interest to the chromosomes in the cell nucleus. Every daughter cell will reflect the genetic modification.

== Applications ==
GM sperm is not frequently used in humans but has been extensively tested and studied in animals. This type of modification of the sperm, eggs, or early embryos is known as an Inheritable Genetic Modification. Because the genetic changes are passed onto future generations, Inheritable Genetic Modification is far more consequential than somatic cell modifications.

== Regulations ==
Genetic modification of sperm cells, as a type of germline gene transfer, is subject to federal regulation in the United States under the Recombinant DNA Advisory Committee of the National Institutes of Health, as well as the Food and Drug Administration. Regulation in the United States currently prohibits the application or research use of such technologies in humans, but does allow for research and commercial use, prior to approval, in animals.

== Controversy ==
Genetic modification in humans is a contested issue due to the variety of social and ethical issues it raises. One such controversy is the ability to modify the genes of future offspring to decrease the likelihood for certain diseases or modify the expression of chosen traits. In a recent case, an American teenager successfully sued a sperm bank, because she had been born with fragile X syndrome. Some also cite the promotion of eugenics through certain applications of genetic modification, justifying the moratorium on research and funding in human trials in many countries.
