= Charles Taliaferro =

American philosopher

- Born: August 25, 1952 (age 74); New York City

Philosophical work
- Era: 21st-century philosophy
- Region: Western Philosophy
- Main interests: Philosophy of religion, aesthetics, religion, philosophy of mind, ideal observer theory

Charles Taliaferro (born August 25, 1952) is an American philosopher specializing in theology and philosophy of religion.

== Biography ==
Taliaferro received his Ph.D. and M.A. from Brown University, his M.T.S. at Harvard University, a M.A. at University of Rhode Island, and a B.A. from Goddard College.

He is an emeritus professor of philosophy at St. Olaf College, a senior research fellow at the Institute for Faithful Research, and a member of the Royal Institute of Philosophy. He is the author, co-author, editor, or co-editor of twenty books, most recently The Image in Mind; Theism, Naturalism and the Imagination, co-authored with the American artist Jil Evans. He has been a visiting scholar or guest lecturer at a large number of universities, including Brown, Cambridge, Notre Dame, Oxford, Princeton, and the University of Chicago. Since 2013 Taliaferro is editor-in-chief of the journal Open Theology.

Taliaferro has defended substance dualism.

== Selected publications ==
- Image in Mind: Theism, Naturalism, and the Imagination (Continuum Studies In Philosophy Of Religion). London: Bloomsbury Academic, 2013. With Jil Evans.
- The Golden Cord: A Short Book on the Secular and the Sacred. Notre Dame, IN: Notre Dame University Press, 2012.
- The Routledge Companion to Theism. New York: Routledge, 2012. Edited, with Victoria Harrison and Stewart Goetz.
- A Brief History of the Soul. Hoboken, NJ: Wiley-Blackwell, 2011. With Stewart Goetz.
- Turning Images in Philosophy, Science and Religion: A New Book of Nature. New York: Oxford University Press, 2011. With Jil Evans.
- Aesthetics: A Beginner's Guide. London: Oneworld Publications, 2011.
- A Dictionary of Philosophy of Religion. London: Bloomsbury Academic, 2010. Editor, with Elsa Marty.
- A Companion to Philosophy of Religion, 2nd Edition. Hoboken, NJ: Wiley-Blackwell, 2010. Editor, with Paul Draper and Philip Quinn.
- The Cambridge Companion to Christian Philosophical Theology. New York: Cambridge University Press, 2009. Editor, with Chad Meister.
- Dialogues about God (New Dialogues in Philosophy). Lanham, MD: Rowman & Littlefield Publishers, 2009.
- Philosophy of Religion: A Beginner's Guide. London: Oneworld Publications, 2009.
- Naturalism (Interventions). Grand Rapids, MI: Eerdmans, 2008. With Steart Goetz.
- Is God Real? (RZIM Critical Questions Discussion Guides). Downers Grove, IL: InterVarsity Press, 2007. With William Lane Craig.
- Love, Love, Love: And Other Essays. Lanham, MD: Cowley Publications, 2006.
- Evidence and Faith: Philosophy and Religion since the Seventeenth Century. (The Evolution of Modern Philosophy). New York: Cambridge University Press, 2005.
- Cambridge Platonist Spirituality. (Classics of Western Spirituality). Mahwah, NJ: Paulist Press, 2004. With Alison Tepley and Jaroslav Pelikan.
- Praying with C.S. Lewis (Companions for the Journey). Frederick, MN: Word Among Us Press, 2004.
- Philosophy of Religion: An Anthology. Lanham, MD: Rowman & Littlefield, 2003. Editor, with Paul Griffiths.
- Contemporary Philosophy of Religion: An Introduction. (Contemporary Philosophy) Hoboken, NJ: Wiley-Blackwell, 1998.
- Consciousness and the Mind of God. New York: Cambridge University Press, 1994.
