= Methexis =

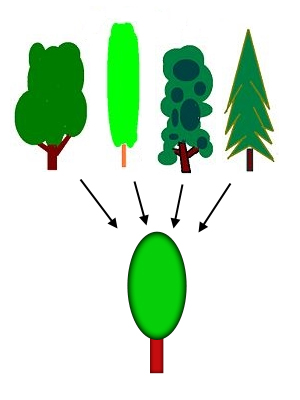
A diagram illustrating graphically the generalization process, using trees

In theatre, methexis (Ancient Greek: μέθεξις; also methectics), is "group sharing". Originating from Greek theatre, the audience participates, creates and improvises the action of the ritual.

In philosophy, methexis is the relation between a particular and a Form (in Plato's sense); e.g., a beautiful object is said to partake of, or participate in, the Form of Beauty.

Methexis is sometimes contrasted with mimesis. The latter "connotes emphasis on the solo performer (the hero) separate from the audience," in direct contrast to the communal methectic theatrical experience which has "little or no 'fourth wall'".
