= Louis de La Forge =

French physician and philosopher

Louis de La Forge (French: [lwi də la fɔʁʒ]; 24 November 1632 – 1666) was a French physician and philosopher who in his Tractatus de mente humana (Traité de l'esprit de l'homme, 1664; in English: "Treatise on the Human Mind") expounded the doctrine of occasionalism.

He was born in La Flèche and died in Saumur. He was a friend of Descartes, and one of the most able interpreters of Cartesianism.

== Bibliography ==
- 1664, Traité de l’esprit de l’homme et de ses facultés ou fonctions et de son union avec le corps, Amsterdam.
  - ed. Abraham Wolfgang, Hildesheim; New York, Georg Olms Verlag, 1984 ISBN 978-3-487-07476-4
- Jacques Isolle, « Un Disciple de Descartes : Louis de La Forge », 1971, XVII siècle n° 92, pp. 98–131
