= Essence =

That which makes or defines an entity

Essence (Latin: essentia) has various meanings and uses for different thinkers and in different contexts. It is used in philosophy and theology as a designation for the property or set of properties or attributes that make an entity the entity it is or, expressed negatively, without which it would lose its identity. Essence is contrasted with accident, which is a property or attribute the entity has accidentally or contingently, but upon which its identity does not depend.

== Etymology ==
The English word essence comes from Latin essentia, via French essence. The original Latin word was created purposefully, by Ancient Roman philosophers, in order to provide an adequate Latin translation for the Greek term ousia.

The concept originates as a precise technical term with Aristotle, who used the Greek expression to ti ên einai literally meaning "the what it was to be." This also corresponds to the scholastic term quiddity or sometimes the shorter phrase to ti esti literally meaning "the what it is" and corresponding to the scholastic term haecceity (thisness) for the same idea. This phrase presented such difficulties for its Latin translators that they coined the word essentia to represent the whole expression. For Aristotle and his scholastic followers, the notion of essence is closely linked to that of definition (horismos).

Stoic philosopher Seneca (d. 65 AD) attributed creation of the word to Cicero (d. 43 BC), while rhetor Quintilian (d. 100 AD) claimed that the word was created by the Stoic philosopher Sergius Plautus (d. 62 AD).

Early use of the term is also attested in works of Apuleius (d. 170 AD) and Tertullian (d. 240 AD). During Late Antiquity, the term was often used in Christian theology, and through the works of Augustine (d. 430), Boethius (d. 524) and later theologians, who wrote in Medieval Latin, it became the basis for consequent creation of derived terms in many languages.

Thomas Aquinas, in his commentary on De hebdomadibus (Book II) by Boethius, states that in this work the distinction between essence (id quod est, what the thing is) and Being (esse) was introduced for the first time. Whereas the Being participated in entities is infinite and infinitely perfect, the essence — and not the matter — delimits the perfection of the Being in entities and makes them finite.

== Philosophy ==
=== Ontological status ===
In his dialogues Plato suggests that concrete beings acquire their essence through their relations to "forms"—abstract universals logically or ontologically separate from the objects of sense perception. These forms are often put forth as the models or paradigms of which sensible things are "copies". Sensible bodies are in constant flux and imperfect and hence, by Plato's reckoning, less real than the forms which are eternal, unchanging, and complete. Typical examples of forms given by Plato are largeness, smallness, equality, unity, goodness, beauty, and justice.

According to nominalists such as William of Ockham, universals are not concrete entities, just names (i.e., labels); there are only individuals. Universals are words that can call to several individuals; for example, the word "homo". Therefore, a universal is reduced to a spoken sound (according to Roscelin), or the (mental) concept to which it corresponds (as Ockham had it)—rather than a substantial, actual "thing" that exists outside of these contexts.

John Locke distinguished between "real essences" and "nominal essences". Real essences are the thing(s) that makes a thing a thing, whereas nominal essences are our conception of what makes a thing a thing.

According to Edmund Husserl, essence is ideal. However, ideal means that essence is an intentional object of consciousness. Essence is interpreted as sense.

=== Existentialism ===
Existentialism is often summed up by Jean-Paul Sartre's statement that for human beings "existence precedes essence", which he understood as a repudiation of the philosophical system that had come before him. Instead of "is-ness" generating "actuality," he argued that existence and actuality come first, and the essence is derived afterward.

In this respect he breaks with Søren Kierkegaard, who, although often described as a proto-existentialist, identified essence as "nature." For him, there is no such thing as "human nature" that determines how a human will behave or what a human will be. First, he or she exists, and then comes property. Jean-Paul Sartre's more materialist and skeptical existentialism furthered this existentialist tenet by flatly refuting any metaphysical essence, any soul, and arguing instead that there is merely existence, with attributes as essence.

Thus, in existentialist discourse, essence can refer to:

- a physical aspect or property;
- the ongoing being of a person (the character or internally determined goals); or
- the infinite inbound within the human (which can be lost, can atrophy, or can be developed into an equal part with the finite), depending upon the type of existentialist discourse.

== Religion ==
=== Buddhism ===
Within the Madhyamaka school of Mahayana Buddhism, Candrakirti identifies the self as "an essence of things that does not depend on others; it is an intrinsic nature. The non-existence of that is selflessness." Buddhapālita adds, while commenting on Nagārjuna's Mūlamadhyamakakārikā, "What is the reality of things just as it is? It is the absence of essence. Unskilled persons whose eye of intelligence is obscured by the darkness of delusion conceive of an essence of things and then generate attachment and hostility with regard to them."

For the Madhyamaka Buddhists, 'Emptiness' (also known as Anatta or Anatman) is the strong assertion that:

- all phenomena are empty of any essence;
- anti-essentialism lies at the root of Buddhist praxis; and
- it is the innate belief in essence that is considered to be an afflictive obscuration which serves as the root of all suffering.

However, the Madhyamaka also rejects the tenets of idealism, materialism or nihilism; instead, the ideas of truth or existence, along with any assertions that depend upon them, are limited to their function within the contexts and conventions that assert them, possibly somewhat akin to relativism or pragmatism. For the Madhyamaka, replacement paradoxes such as Ship of Theseus are answered by stating that the Ship of Theseus remains so (within the conventions that assert it) until it ceases to function as the Ship of Theseus.

In Nagarjuna's Mulamadhyamakakarika Chapter XV examines essence itself.

=== Christianity ===
Essence, nature, or substance in Christianity means what something is in itself and is distinguished from something's accidents (appearance). For example, according to transubstantiation, the eucharistic bread and wine appear to be bread and wine, but are in essence - Jesus' body and blood. Another example is Jesus' teaching "Stop judging by appearances, but judge justly." A third example is the Beatific Vision: the angels and saints in Heaven see God's essence.

=== Hinduism ===
In understanding any individual personality, a distinction is made between one's Swadharma (essence) and Swabhava (mental habits and conditionings of ego personality). Svabhava is the nature of a person, which is a result of his or her samskaras (impressions created in the mind due to one's interaction with the external world). These samskaras create habits and mental models and those become our nature. While there is another kind of svabhava that is a pure internal quality – smarana – we are here focusing only on the svabhava that was created due to samskaras (because to discover the pure, internal svabhava and smarana, one should become aware of one's samskaras and take control over them). Dharma is derived from the root dhr "to hold." It is that which holds an entity together. That is, Dharma is that which gives integrity to an entity and holds the core quality and identity (essence), form and function of that entity. Dharma is also defined as righteousness and duty. To do one's dharma is to be righteous, to do one's dharma is to do one's duty (express one's essence).

== See also ==
- Avicenna
- Essentialism
- Hypokeimenon
- Modal logic
- Phenomenon
- Physical ontology
- Smarana
- Theory of forms
- Transubstantiation

== Sources ==
- Athanasopoulos, Constantinos; Schneider, Christoph, eds. (2013). Divine Essence and Divine Energies: Ecumenical Reflections on the Presence of God. Cambridge, UK: James Clarke & Co. ISBN 9780227900086.
- Aveling, Francis (1909). "Essence and Existence". The Catholic Encyclopedia. Vol. 5. New York: Robert Appleton Company.
- Brown, Stephen F. (1996). "Theology and Philosophy". Medieval Latin: An Introduction and Bibliographical Guide. Washington, D.C.: CUA Press. pp. 267–287. ISBN 9780813208428.
- Weedman, Mark (2007). The Trinitarian Theology of Hilary of Poitiers. Leiden-Boston: Brill. ISBN 978-9004162242.
