= Accident (philosophy) =

Philosophical attribute

An accident (Greek συμβεβηκός), in metaphysics and philosophy, is a property that the entity or substance has contingently, without which the substance can still retain its identity. An accident does not affect its essence, according to many philosophers. It does not mean an "accident" as used in common speech, a chance incident, normally harmful. Examples of accidents are color, taste, movement, and stagnation. Accident is contrasted with essence: a designation for the property or set of properties that make an entity or substance what it fundamentally is, and which it has by necessity, and without which it loses its identity.

Aristotle made a distinction between the essential and accidental properties of a thing. Thomas Aquinas and other Catholic theologians have employed the Aristotelian concepts of substance and accident in articulating the theology of the Eucharist, particularly the transubstantiation of bread and wine into body and blood.

In modern philosophy, an accident (or accidental property) is the union of two concepts: property and contingency. Non-essentialism argues that every property is an accident. Modal necessitarianism argues that all properties are essential and no property is an accident.

== Aristotle ==
Aristotle made a distinction between the essential and accidental properties of a thing. For example, a chair can be made of wood or metal, but this is accidental to its being a chair: that is, it is still a chair regardless of the material from which it is made. To put this in technical terms, an accident is a property which has no necessary connection to the essence of the thing being described.

To take another example, all bachelors are unmarried: this is the necessary or essential property of what it means to be a bachelor. A particular bachelor may have brown hair, but this would be a property particular to that individual, and with respect to his bachelorhood it would be an accidental property. And this distinction is independent of experimental verification: even if for some reason all the unmarried men with non-brown hair were killed, and every single existent bachelor had brown hair, the property of having brown hair would still be accidental since it would still be logically possible for a bachelor to have hair of another color.

The nine kinds of accidents, according to Aristotle, are quantity, quality, relation, habitus, time, location, situation (or position), action, and passion ("being acted on"). Together with "substance", these nine kinds of accidents constitute the ten fundamental categories of Aristotle's ontology.

== Theological application ==
Catholic theologians such as Thomas Aquinas have employed the Aristotelian concepts of substance and accident in articulating the theology of the Eucharist, particularly the transubstantiation of bread and wine into body and blood. According to this tradition, the accidents (or species) of the appearance of bread and wine do not change, but the substance changes from bread and wine to the Body and Blood of Christ.

== Modern philosophy ==
In modern philosophy, an accident (or accidental property) is the union of two concepts: property and contingency. In relation to the first, an accidental property (Greek symbebekos) is at its most basic level a property. The color "yellow", "high value", "Atomic Number 79" are all properties, and are therefore candidates for being accidental. On the other hand, "gold", "platinum", and "electrum" are not properties, and are therefore not classified as accidents.

There are two opposed philosophical positions that also impact the meaning of this term:

- Anti-essentialism (associated with Willard Van Orman Quine) argues that there are no essential properties at all, and therefore every property is an accident.
- Modal necessitarianism (associated with Saul Kripke), argues for the veracity of the modal system "Triv" (If P is true, then P must be true). The consequence of this theory is that all properties are essential (and no property is an accident).

== See also ==
- Potentiality and actuality
  - Actualism – Philosophical view that everything there is is actual
- Essence
- Hypostasis (philosophy and religion)
- Indeterminism
- Modal logic
- Ousia
- Qualia
- Randomness
  - Coincidence and synchronicity, in which accident may seem (to human cognition) to defy mere randomness alone (although whether it truly does is a philosophical challenge)
- Romance copula § Spanish: ser versus estar
- Stochastics
- Substance theory
