= Versuch einer Metaphysik der inneren Natur =

1834 book by Heinrich Schmid

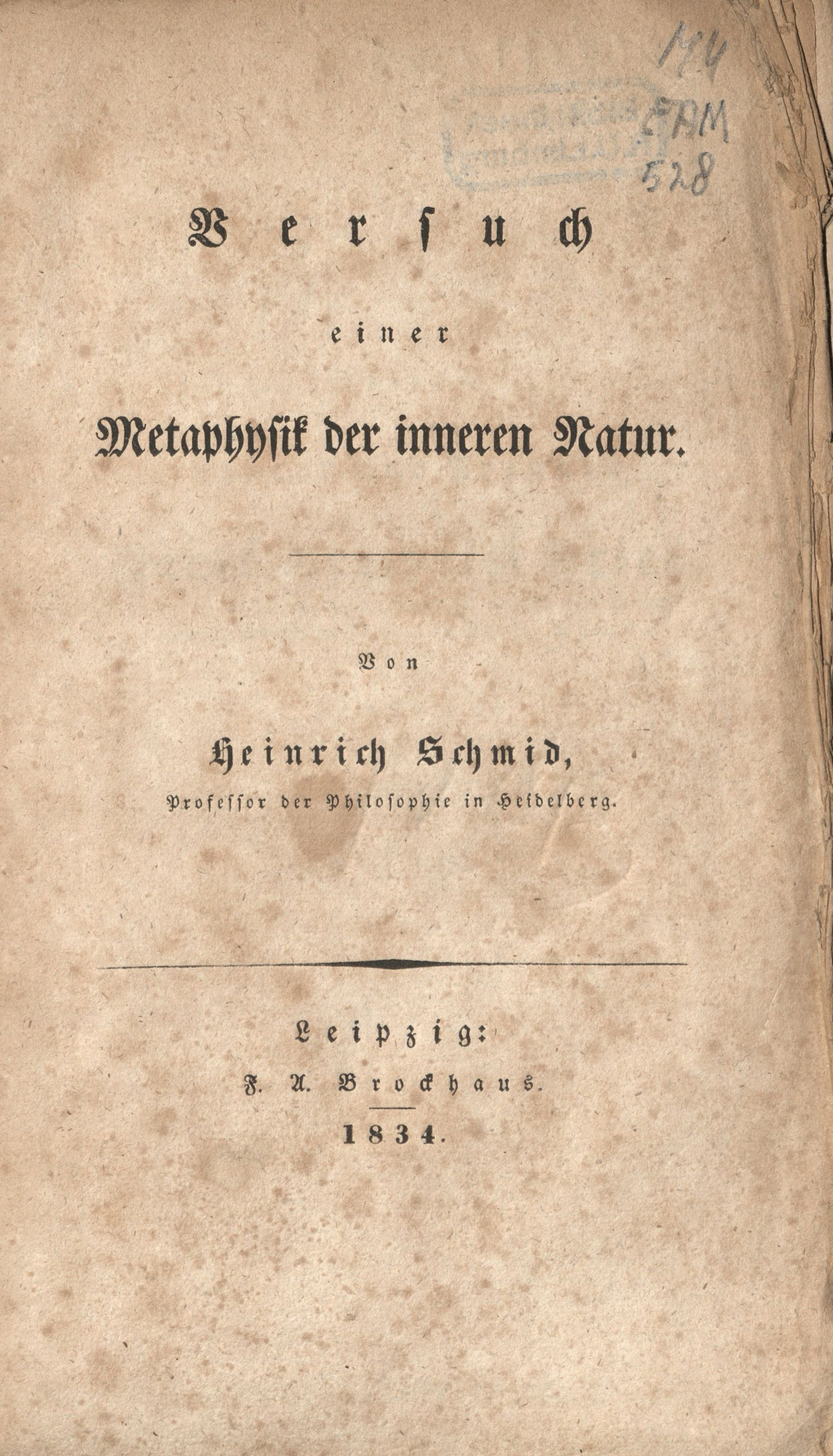
- Title page of the book
- Author: Heinrich Schmid
- Language: German
- Publisher: Brockhaus Leipzig
- Publication date: 1834
- Pages: 343

Versuch einer Metaphysik der inneren Natur (English: Attempt at a metaphysics of inner nature) is a book written by German author Heinrich Schmid (1799–1836). It was published by Brockhaus Leipzig in 1834. In this book, Schmid attempts to develop a metaphysical account of humans' inner nature, the soul, in terms of general laws. These laws, Schmid proposes, should be based on empirically gathered knowledge about inner nature. He argues, that with the formulation of such laws, psychology, the science of the human soul, should become a natural science like physics. Schmid's ideas build heavily on the philosophy of Immanuel Kant, for which he was criticized. He belonged to the philosophical school surrounding Jakob Friedrich Fries, whose ideas are associated with Neo-Kantianism. Schmid's theories, especially concerning memory, were adopted by Sir William Hamilton, whose philosophy was discussed by John Stuart Mill at the end of the 19th century. Wilhelm Wundt and his contemporaries still used methods similar to Schmid's structured introspection once psychology was founded as an independent discipline in 1879.

== Context ==
Schmid studied philosophy, history, and theology in Jena. During his time in Jena and Göttingen as well as later as a professor of philosophy in Heidelberg he published in literary magazines, where he critically evaluated religious and philosophical ideas. In 1824 he started to publish the journal Für Theologie und Philosophie: eine Oppositionsschrift (English: For Theology and Philosophy: an opposition paper) together with his friend and Neo-kantian philosopher Jakob Friedrich Fries. Schmid belonged to the early Friesian school, and his ideas were greatly influenced by Fries' philosophy which, as part of the Neo-Kantian movement, built on the concepts developed by Kant. Fries defined psychology as an independent empirical science, which distanced him from the prevailing German idealist movement. Schmid published his Versuch einer Metaphysik der inneren Natur in response to Fries' 1824 metaphysical account System der Metaphysik (English: System of Metaphysics). In his book, Schmid described the foundations of Fries' psychology while going into detail on the fundamental principles, where he claims to be unprecedented. Versuch einer Metaphysik der inneren Natur is dedicated to Fries.

Versuch einer Metaphysik der inneren Natur was written at a time when psychology was not yet established as an independent discipline. The study of the soul has always been a central part of philosophy. In the 18th century, there had been a rising interest in finding scientific explanations for human behavior due to the rise of the mechanistic worldview and the founding of empiricism. The increased interest of philosophers in psychological topics is evident in the number of publications and courses that covered the study of the human soul. The ideas Schmid put forth in his book build on several important 18th-century philosophers in addition to Fries. Among those philosophers was Immanuel Kant, who explored the human mind and soul in his Kritik der reinen Vernunft (1781) (English: Critique of pure reason), which is still studied in the 21st century. Topics and postulates developed by Kant, such as the existence of a priori categories as well as unconscious darkened representations were later taken up in Schmid's Versuch einer Metaphysik der inneren Natur. Another philosopher that pondered psychological topics was Christian Wolff. Wolff distinguished between rational and empirical psychology. Even though the ideas Schmid introduces in his book show similarities to Wolff's rational psychology, Schmid explicitly distances himself from Wolff's concept. Schmid's theory of self-activity of the mind was adapted from Gottfried Wilhelm Leibniz.

== Content ==
Versuch einer Metaphysik der Inneren Natur is divided into sixteen chapters where the soul is systematically discussed from a philosophical-psychological perspective. In the introduction, Schmid describes his goal of discovering general laws that describe the activities of the soul. Further, he explains the distinction between ghost, soul, and mind; the religious and psychological study of the soul; as well as human and animal souls. Schmid declares that religious ideas should not be part of psychology.

The first chapter further elaborates on his idea of general laws for inner nature. Chapters two through nine discuss the soul by Kant's categories of quality, quantity, and relation. The concept of relation is further divided into essence, cause, and interaction. The tenth and eleventh chapters discuss the laws of the lower life unit which includes memory and imagination. The twelfth chapter discusses the laws of the higher life unit which is constituted by self-control and reason. The thirteenth chapter elaborates on the difference between self-control and self-activity of the soul, the former being the force of will steering inner activity, the latter being the soul's ability to be active in itself. Chapters fourteen and fifteen further investigate parts of the higher life unit. The last chapter describes the developmental stages of the soul. The first stage is the sensual stage, where the soul's activity is determined alone by sensual excitation. The second stage is the lower life unit, where habit, customs, memory, and imagination influence the soul's activity by the association of ideas. The third and highest stage is the higher life unit. Here the soul determines its activity through reason. It has achieved inner freedom.

== Reception ==
Versuch einer Metaphysik der inneren Natur is mentioned by the literary magazine Blätter für literarische Unterhaltung (English: Pamphlets for literary conversation) from September 1834, the contents of the book are summarized and commented on. The book is criticized for producing too few new ideas due to building on Kant's concept of categories. The review concludes that real insights are left to be discovered by empirical psychology. In 1836 the literary magazine Allgemeine Literatur Zeitung (English: General literary magazine) included Heinrich Schmid's Versuch einer Metaphysik der inneren Natur in an overview over the literature of speculative philosophy from 1830 to 1834. This magazine gives a review of the book, criticizing the misuse of the word metaphysics in the Kantian sense. It further condemns the use of a subjective instead of a scientific investigation of the metaphysical problems discussed in the book. Overall, the book is judged to be a "very unsatisfying account of subjective idealism". However, Schmid's philosophy was opposed to idealism. Ferdinand Rieck mentions Schmid's book in his book Diesseits und jenseits (1860) and describes it as a valuable philosophical work that excited at the time, which rejected both idealism and realism but did not lead to insights about inner nature. Schmid's work was cited by his contemporaries. Multiple books mention him in relation to Johann Friedrich Herbart who also belonged to the Neo-Kantian school and whose ideas built on Leibniz.

The 19th-century metaphysician Sir William Hamilton adopted Schmid's ideas about the self-activity of the soul as well as his theory of memory and quoted him extensively. John Stuart Mill was influenced by Hamilton's ideas and also examined the theories that built on Schmid's philosophy. He judged Schmid's notion of the impossibility of extinguishing memories or desires to be unworthy of Hamilton. Mill describes Schmid as belonging to "a school of German metaphysicians who have remained several centuries behind the progress of philosophical enquiry, having never yet felt the influence of the Baconian reform". Hamilton's ideas, some of which are built on Schmid's philosophy, were mentioned by William James in his The Principles of Psychology (1890). James builds his discussion of Hamilton's ideas on Mill's book An examination of Sir William Hamilton's philosophy (1865). Like Mill, James criticizes Hamilton's idea of revivable memories, which James explicitly mentions as belonging to "German writer Schmid".

Schmid's book was an extension of Fries' previously published System der Methaphysik (1824). Three years after the publication of Versuch einer Metaphysik der inneren Natur, Fries published Handbuch der psychologischen Antrophologie oder der Lehre von der Natur des Geistes (English: Textbook for psychological anthropohology or the study of the nature of the mind) where Fries, in turn, builds on Schmid's modifications of Fries' initial psychological ideas.

After the publication of the book, Schmid continued his professorship of philosophy in Heidelberg and started another book: Vorlesungen über das Wesen der Philosophie und ihre Bedeutung für Wissenschaft und Leben (English: Lectures about the essence of philosophy and its importance for science and life). In this book he summarized his philosophy, again taking up issues of psychology that he discussed in his Versuch einer Metaphysik der inneren Natur, now situated in a greater philosophical picture. He died before completing the book, it was published in its unfinished state in 1836. An obituary states that Schmid's works, especially Versuch einer Metaphysik der inneren Natur made him well known and valued.

Versuch einer Metaphysik der inneren Natur was published 45 years before psychology was founded as an independent science with the establishment of the first experimental psychological laboratory by Wilhelm Wundt in 1879. At the time when Schmid wrote Versuch einer Metaphysik der inneren Natur, the subjective and speculative approach to the study of the human soul taken by Schmid was common for philosophers. He describes structured introspection as the principal method to gain insight into the activities of the soul. The method of psychological introspection, which is more structured and objective than other forms of introspection, religious or leisurely, was used later as a method by Wundt and his contemporaries together with more empirical approaches. Many philosophical issues from Schmid's book are still relevant in the 21st century. These include the relationship between psychology and religion, whether knowledge about the essence of the soul can be gathered, as well as the interaction problem between mind and matter.
