= Noogony =

Epistemological term

Noogony (from Ancient Greek roots νόος (nóos, “mind”) + γόνος (gónos, “creation”), nous + -gony) is a general term for any theory of knowledge that attempts to explain the origin of concepts in the human mind by considering sense or a posteriori data as solely relevant.

== Overview ==
The word was used, famously, by Kant in his Critique of Pure Reason to refer to what he understood to be Locke's account of the origin of concepts. While Kant himself maintained that some concepts, e.g. cause and effect, did not arise from experience, he took Locke to be suggesting that all concepts came from experience.

Historically, Kant presents a caricature of Locke's position, not a completely accurate account of Locke's epistemology. Locke's actual theory of knowledge was more subtle than Kant seems to render it in his Critique. As Guyer/Wood note in their edition of the Critique:

Presumably Kant here has in mind Locke's claim that sensation and reflection are the two sources of all our ideas, and is understanding Locke's reflection to be reflection on sensation only. This would be a misunderstanding of Locke, since Locke says that we get simple ideas from reflection on the "operations of our own Mind," a doctrine which is actually a precursor to Kant's view that the laws of our own intuition and thinking furnish the forms of knowledge to be added to the empirical contents furnished by sensation, although of course Locke did not go very far in developing this doctrine; in particular, he did not see that mathematics and logic could be used as sources of information about the operations of the mind.

== See also ==
- Noology
