= Francis Haywood =

British merchant and translator (1796–1858)

- Born: 1796; Liverpool
- Died: 1858 (aged 61–62); Feckenham in Worcestershire
- Occupation: Merchant

Francis Haywood (/ˈheɪwʊd/; 1796–1858) was an English merchant and translator, the first person to translate Kant's Critique of Pure Reason into English.

== Life ==
Born in Liverpool, Haywood lived there for most of his life. In 1828 (describing himself as a 'layman of the Church of England', though he was in fact active in Liverpool Unitarian circles) he translated a reply by the theological rationalist Karl Gottlieb Bretschneider to Hugh James Rose's essay on the state of Protestantism in Germany. In an 1829 Foreign Review article Haywood called for an English translation of Kant's Critique of Pure Reason. Arthur Schopenhauer wrote to him on the matter, but was offended when Haywood suggested they should collaborate on a translation. Haywood's translation of the first Critique appeared anonymously in 1838.

Haywood died on 29 May 1858 at Feckenham in Worcestershire, and was buried in the churchyard of St John the Baptist in Feckenham.

Haywood's daughter Lucy Franklin published an anonymous memoir of her father in the Cornhill Magazine. There are some papers relating to him at Duke University library.

== Works ==
- (tr.) Reply to the Rev. Hugh J. Rose's work on the State of Protestantism in Germany by Karl Gottlieb Bretschneider. G. B. Whittaker: London, 1828
- (tr.) Critick of pure reason by Immanuel Kant, W. Pickering: London, 1838. Revised translation, 1848.
- An analysis of Kant's Critick of pure reason, W. Pickering: London, 1844.
- (tr.) Researches into the History of the Roman Constitution, with an appendix upon the Roman Knights by William Ihne. London, 1853.
