= Vorstellung =

German philosophy term

Vorstellung is a key term in German philosophy, most commonly translated into English as 'representation'. It denotes the mental content or object presented to or before the mind of a cognizing subject. Vorstellung includes sensations, perceptions, intuitions, concepts, and other forms of conscious mental phenomena.

Vorstellung is central to discussions regarding epistemology and human cognition, particularly after Immanuel Kant's Critique of Pure Reason.

== Etymology ==
Vorstellung derives from the German verb vorstellen, literally meaning to "put in front of" or "to present". In German philosophy, it primarily denotes the act or result of mentally presenting something to consciousness.

== In Kantian philosophy ==
Vorstellung is a foundational concept in Kant's transcendental idealism. He discussed the concept in detail in his book Critique of Pure Reason. He defines it thus: "The genus is representation in general (repraesentatio). Under it stands the representation with consciousness (perceptio)."

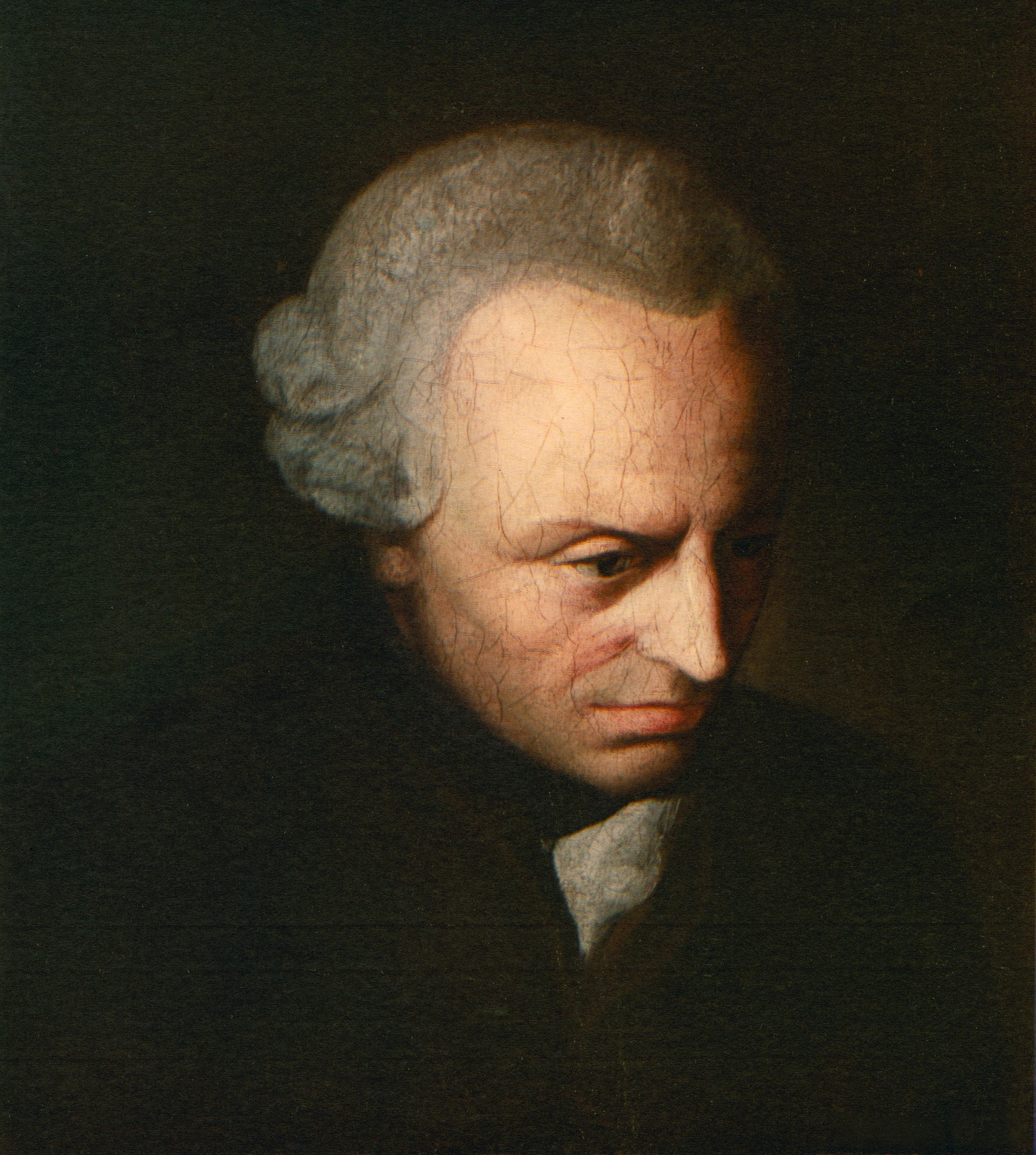
Immanuel Kant portrait c1790

Some scholars argue that Kant's usage of Vorstellung does not necessarily align with modern notions of semantic representational content. Instead, it often functions as mental forms of unity grounded in the mind's faculties (sensibility and understanding), which unify multiplicities in distinct ways.

== Hegel's philosophy ==
In Hegel's philosophy, Vorstellung refers to an intermediate stage between immediate sensation and fully conceptual, speculative thinking. It involves images, symbols, and representations that remain tied to sensuous particularity and spatio-temporal forms, requiring Aufhebung to reach pure conceptual grasp.

== Arthur Schopenhauer ==
Schopenhauer's principal work Die Welt als Wille und Vorstellung is built entirely on Kant's Vorstellung. He begins the book with the assertion, "Die Welt ist meine Vorstellung" (the world is my representation). He goes on to argue that the entire world of objects in space and time, governed by causality, exists only as representation for a knowing subject.

He retains Kant's phenomenon/noumenon distinction but identifies the thing-in-itself as Wille (will). The world as Vorstellung constitutes the objectification or appearance of this will.

== See also ==
- Transcendental idealism
- noumenon
- Thing-in-itself
- German idealism
