= Theory of categories =

In ontology, the highest kinds or genera of entities

In ontology, the theory of categories concerns itself with the categories of being: the highest genera or kinds of entities. To investigate the categories of being, or simply categories, is to determine the most fundamental and the broadest classes of entities. A distinction between such categories, in making the categories or applying them, is called an ontological distinction. Various systems of classification have been proposed; these often include categories for substances, properties, relations, states of affairs, or events. A representative question within the theory of categories might be, for example, that which asks: "Are universals prior to particulars?"

== Early development ==
Early Greek thinkers adopted the concept of a category (the Greek word κατηγορία originally denoted an "accusation", an "assertion" or a "predication") for philosophical classification. The process of abstraction required to discover the number and names of the categories of being has been undertaken by many philosophers since and including Aristotle, and involves the careful inspection of each concept to ensure that there is no higher category or categories which could subsume that concept. The scholars of the twelfth and thirteenth centuries developed Aristotle's ideas. For example, Gilbert of Poitiers divides Aristotle's ten categories into two sets, primary and secondary, according to whether they inhere in the subject or not:

- Primary categories: Substance, Relation, Quantity and Quality
- Secondary categories: Place, Time, Situation, Condition, Action, Passion

Furthermore, following the Neoplatonist Porphyry's likening of the classificatory hierarchy to a tree, they concluded that the major classes could be subdivided to form subclasses; for example: Substance could be divided into Genus and Species, and Quality could be subdivided into Property and Accident, depending on whether the property was necessary or contingent.

An alternative line of development was taken by the second-century Neoplatonic philosopher Plotinus (d. 270 CE), who, by a process of repeated abstraction, reduced Aristotle's list of ten categories to five: Substance, Relation, Quantity, Motion and Quality. Plotinus further suggested that the latter three categories of his list—namely, Quantity, Motion, and Quality—correspond to three different kinds of relation and that these three categories could therefore be subsumed under the category of Relation. This was to lead to the supposition that there were only two categories at the top of the hierarchical tree: Substance and Relation. Many supposed that relations only exist in the mind. Substance and Relation, then, are closely commutative with Matter and Mind—this is expressed most clearly in the dualism of René Descartes.

=== Vaisheshika ===
Padārtha is a Sanskrit word for "categories" in Vaisheshika and Nyaya schools of Indian philosophy.

=== Stoic ===
The Stoics held that all beings (ὄντα)—although not all things (τινά)—are material. Besides the existing beings, they admitted four incorporeals (asomata): time, place, void, and sayable. They were held to be just 'subsisting' while such a status was denied to universals. Thus, they accepted Anaxagoras's idea (as did Aristotle) that if an object is hot, it is because some part of a universal heat body had entered the object. But, unlike Aristotle, they extended the idea to cover all chance incidents. Thus, if an object is red, it would be because some part of a universal red body had entered the object.

They held that there were four categories:

1. Substance (ὑποκείμενον): The primary matter, formless substance, (ousia) that things are made of
2. Quality (ποιόν): The way matter is organized to form an individual object; in Stoic physics, a physical ingredient (pneuma: air or breath), which informs the matter
3. Somehow disposed (πως ἔχον): Particular characteristics, not present within the object, such as size, shape, action, and posture
4. Somehow disposed in relation to something (πρός τί πως ἔχον): Characteristics related to other phenomena, such as the position of an object within time and space relative to other objects

A simple example of the Stoic categories in use is provided by Jacques Brunschwig:

I am a certain lump of matter, and thereby a substance, an existent something (and thus far that is all); I am a man, and this individual man that I am, and thereby qualified by a common quality and a peculiar one; I am sitting or standing, disposed in a certain way; I am the father of my children, the fellow citizen of my fellow citizens, disposed in a certain way in relation to something else.

=== Aristotle ===
One of Aristotle’s early interests lay in the classification of the natural world: how, for example, the genus "animal" could be first divided into "two-footed animal" and then into "wingless, two-footed animal". He realized that the distinctions were being made according to the qualities the animal possesses, the quantity of its parts, and the kind of motion that it exhibits. Aristotle stated, in his work on the Categories, that—to fully complete, e.g., the proposition "this animal is ..."—there were ten kinds of predicate where:

"... each signifies either substance or quantity or quality or relation or where or when or being-in-a-position or having or acting or being acted upon".

He realized that predicates could be simple or complex. The simple kinds consist of a subject and a predicate linked together by the "categorical" or inherent type of relation. For Aristotle, the more complex kinds were limited to propositions wherein the predicate is compounded of two of the above categories; for example, "this is a horse running". More complex kinds of proposition were only discovered after Aristotle by the Stoic philosopher Chrysippus, who developed the "hypothetical" and "disjunctive" types of syllogism; these were terms that were to be developed through the Middle Ages, and which would reappear in Kant's system of categories.

Category came into use with Aristotle's essay Categories, in which he discussed univocal and equivocal terms, predication, and ten categories:

- Substance, essence (ousia) – examples of primary substance: this man, this horse; secondary substance (species, genera): man, horse
- Quantity (poson, how much), discrete or continuous – examples: two cubits long, number, space, (length of) time.
- Quality (poion, of what kind or description) – examples: white, black, grammatical, hot, sweet, curved, straight.
- Relation (pros ti, toward something) – examples: double, half, large, master, knowledge.
- Place (pou, where) – examples: in a marketplace, in the Lyceum
- Time (pote, when) – examples: yesterday, last year
- Position, posture, attitude (keisthai, to lie) – examples: sitting, lying, standing
- State, condition (echein, to have or be) – examples: shod, armed
- Action (poiein, to make or do) – examples: to lance, to heat, to cool (something)
- Affection, passion (paschein, to suffer or undergo) – examples: to be lanced, to be heated, to be cooled

=== Plotinus ===
Plotinus, in writing his Enneads around AD 250, recorded that "Philosophy at a very early age investigated the number and character of the existents ... some found ten, others less ... to some the genera were the first principles, to others only a generic classification of existents." He realized that some categories were reducible to others, writing: "Why are not Beauty, Goodness and the virtues, Knowledge and Intelligence included among the primary genera?" He concluded that such transcendental categories, and even the categories of Aristotle, were in some way posterior to the three Eleatic categories first recorded in Plato's dialogue Parmenides, which comprised the following three coupled terms:

- Unity/Plurality
- Motion/Stability
- Identity/Difference

Plotinus called these "the hearth of reality", deriving from them not only the three categories of Quantity, Motion, and Quality, but also what came to be known as "the three moments of the Neoplatonic world process":

- First, there existed the "One", and "the origin of things is a contemplation" of this "One";
- The Second "is certainly an activity ... a secondary phase ... life streaming from life ... energy running through the universe";
- The Third is some kind of Intelligence, concerning which he wrote: "Activity is prior to Intellection ... and self-knowledge."

Plotinus likened the three to the center, the radii, and the circumference of a circle, and clearly thought that the principles underlying the categories were the first principles of creation: "From a single root all being multiplies." Similar ideas were introduced into Early Christian thought by, for example, Gregory of Nazianzus (d. 390), who summed the process up saying "Therefore, Unity, having from all eternity arrived by motion at duality, came to rest in Trinity."

== Modern development ==
Kant and Hegel accused the Aristotelian table of categories of being 'rhapsodic', derived arbitrarily and in bulk from experience, without any systematic necessity.

The early modern dualism, which has been described above, of Mind and Matter or Subject and Relation, as reflected in the writings of Descartes underwent a substantial revision in the late 18th century. The first objections to this stance were formulated in the eighteenth century by Immanuel Kant who realised that we can say nothing about Substance except through the relation of the subject to other things.

For example: in the sentence "this is a house", the substantive subject "house" only gains meaning in relation to human use patterns or to other similar houses. The category of Substance disappears from Kant's tables, and under the heading of Relation, Kant lists inter alia the three relationship types of Disjunction, Causality and Inherence. The three older concepts of Quantity, Motion and Quality, as Peirce discovered, could be subsumed under these three broader headings in that Quantity relates to the subject through the relation of Disjunction; Motion relates to the subject through the relation of Causality; and Quality relates to the subject through the relation of Inherence. Sets of three continued to play an important part in the nineteenth century development of the categories, most notably in G.W.F. Hegel's extensive tabulation of categories, and in C.S. Peirce's categories set out in his work on the logic of relations. One of Peirce's contributions was to call the three primary categories Firstness, Secondness and Thirdness which both emphasizes their general nature, and avoids the confusion of having the same name for both the category itself and for a concept within that category.

In a separate development, and building on the notion of primary and secondary categories introduced by the Scholastics, Kant introduced the idea that secondary or "derivative" categories could be derived from the primary categories through the combination of one primary category with another. This would result in the formation of three secondary categories: the first, "Community" was an example that Kant gave of such a derivative category; the second, "Modality", introduced by Kant, was a term which Hegel, in developing Kant's dialectical method, showed could also be seen as a derivative category; and the third, "Spirit" or "Will" were terms that Hegel and Schopenhauer were developing separately for use in their own systems. Karl Jaspers in the twentieth century, in his development of existential categories, brought the three together, allowing for differences in terminology, as Substantiality, Communication and Will. This pattern of three primary and three secondary categories was used most notably in the nineteenth century by Peter Mark Roget to form the six headings of his Thesaurus of English Words and Phrases. The headings used were the three objective categories of Abstract Relation, Space (including Motion) and Matter and the three subjective categories of Intellect, Feeling and Volition, and he found that under these six headings all the words of the English language, and hence any possible predicate, could be assembled.

=== Kant ===
In the Critique of Pure Reason (1781), Immanuel Kant argued that the categories are part of our own mental structure and consist of a set of a priori concepts through which we interpret the world around us. These concepts correspond to twelve logical functions of the understanding which we use to make judgements and there are therefore two tables given in the Critique, one of the Judgements and a corresponding one for the Categories. To give an example, the logical function behind our reasoning from ground to consequence (based on the Hypothetical relation) underlies our understanding of the world in terms of cause and effect (the Causal relation). In each table the number twelve arises from, firstly, an initial division into two: the Mathematical and the Dynamical; a second division of each of these headings into a further two: Quantity and Quality, and Relation and Modality respectively; and, thirdly, each of these then divides into a further three subheadings as follows.

Table of Judgements

Mathematical

- Quantity
  - Universal
  - Particular
  - Singular
- Quality
  - Affirmative
  - Negative
  - Infinite

Dynamical

- Relation
  - Categorical
  - Hypothetical
  - Disjunctive
- Modality
  - Problematic
  - Assertoric
  - Apodictic

Table of Categories

Mathematical

- Quantity
  - Unity
  - Plurality
  - Totality
- Quality
  - Reality
  - Negation
  - Limitation

Dynamical

- Relation
  - Inherence and Subsistence (substance and accident)
  - Causality and Dependence (cause and effect)
  - Community (reciprocity)
- Modality
  - Possibility
  - Existence
  - Necessity

Criticism of Kant's system followed, firstly, by Arthur Schopenhauer, who amongst other things was unhappy with the term "Community", and declared that the tables "do open violence to truth, treating it as nature was treated by old-fashioned gardeners", and secondly, by W.T.Stace who in his book The Philosophy of Hegel suggested that in order to make Kant's structure completely symmetrical a third category would need to be added to the Mathematical and the Dynamical. This, he said, Hegel was to do with his category of concept.

=== Hegel ===
G.W.F. Hegel in his Science of Logic (1812) attempted to provide a more comprehensive system of categories than Kant and developed a structure that was almost entirely triadic. So important were the categories to Hegel that he claimed the first principle of the world, which he called the "absolute", is "a system of categories ... the categories must be the reason of which the world is a consequent".

Using his own logical method of sublation, later called the Hegelian dialectic, reasoning from the abstract through the negative to the concrete, he arrived at a hierarchy of some 270 categories, as explained by W. T. Stace. The three very highest categories were "logic", "nature" and "spirit". The three highest categories of "logic", however, he called "being", "essence", and "notion" which he explained as follows:

- Being was differentiated from Nothing by containing with it the concept of the "other", an initial internal division that can be compared with Kant's category of disjunction. Stace called the category of Being the sphere of common sense containing concepts such as consciousness, sensation, quantity, quality and measure.
- Essence. The "other" separates itself from the "one" by a kind of motion, reflected in Hegel's first synthesis of "becoming". For Stace this category represented the sphere of science containing within it firstly, the thing, its form and properties; secondly, cause, effect and reciprocity, and thirdly, the principles of classification, identity and difference.
- Notion. Having passed over into the "Other" there is an almost Neoplatonic return into a higher unity that in embracing the "one" and the "other" enables them to be considered together through their inherent qualities. This according to Stace is the sphere of philosophy proper where we find not only the three types of logical proposition: disjunctive, hypothetical, and categorical but also the three transcendental concepts of beauty, goodness and truth.

Schopenhauer's category that corresponded with "notion" was that of "idea", which in his Four-Fold Root of Sufficient Reason he complemented with the category of the "will". The title of his major work was The World as Will and Idea. The two other complementary categories, reflecting one of Hegel's initial divisions, were those of Being and Becoming. At around the same time, Goethe was developing his colour theories in the Farbenlehre of 1810, and introduced similar principles of combination and complementation, symbolizing, for Goethe, "the primordial relations which belong both to nature and vision". Hegel in his Science of Logic accordingly asks us to see his system not as a tree but as a circle.

== Twentieth-century development ==
In the twentieth century the primacy of the division between the subjective and the objective, or between mind and matter, was disputed by, among others, Bertrand Russell and Gilbert Ryle. Philosophy began to move away from the metaphysics of categorization towards the linguistic problem of trying to differentiate between, and define, the words being used. Ludwig Wittgenstein’s conclusion was that there were no clear definitions which we can give to words and categories but only a "halo" or "corona" of related meanings radiating around each term. Gilbert Ryle thought the problem could be seen in terms of dealing with "a galaxy of ideas" rather than a single idea, and suggested that category mistakes are made when a concept (e.g. "university"), understood as falling under one category (e.g. abstract idea), is used as though it falls under another (e.g. physical object). With regard to the visual analogies being used, Peirce and Lewis, just like Plotinus earlier, likened the terms of propositions to points, and the relations between the terms to lines. Peirce, taking this further, talked of univalent, bivalent and trivalent relations linking predicates to their subject and it is just the number and types of relation linking subject and predicate that determine the category into which a predicate might fall. Primary categories contain concepts where there is one dominant kind of relation to the subject. Secondary categories contain concepts where there are two dominant kinds of relation. Examples of the latter were given by Heidegger in his two propositions "the house is on the creek" where the two dominant relations are spatial location (Disjunction) and cultural association (Inherence), and "the house is eighteenth century" where the two relations are temporal location (Causality) and cultural quality (Inherence). A third example may be inferred from Kant in the proposition "the house is impressive or sublime" where the two relations are spatial or mathematical disposition (Disjunction) and dynamic or motive power (Causality). Both Peirce and Wittgenstein introduced the analogy of color theory in order to illustrate the shades of meanings of words. Primary categories, like primary colors, are analytical representing the furthest we can go in terms of analysis and abstraction and include Quantity, Motion and Quality. Secondary categories, like secondary colors, are synthetic and include concepts such as Substance, Community and Spirit.

Apart from these, the categorial scheme of Alfred North Whitehead and his Process Philosophy, alongside Nicolai Hartmann and his Critical Realism, remain one of the most detailed and advanced systems in categorial research in metaphysics.

=== Peirce ===
Charles Sanders Peirce, who had read Kant and Hegel closely, and who also had some knowledge of Aristotle, proposed a system of merely three phenomenological categories: Firstness, Secondness, and Thirdness, which he repeatedly invoked in his subsequent writings. Like Hegel, C.S. Peirce attempted to develop a system of categories from a single indisputable principle, in Peirce's case the notion that in the first instance he could only be aware of his own ideas. "It seems that the true categories of consciousness are first, feeling ... second, a sense of resistance ... and third, synthetic consciousness, or thought". Elsewhere he called the three primary categories: Quality, Reaction and Meaning, and even Firstness, Secondness and Thirdness, saying, "perhaps it is not right to call these categories conceptions, they are so intangible that they are rather tones or tints upon conceptions":

- Firstness (Quality): "The first is predominant in feeling ... we must think of a quality without parts, e.g. the colour of magenta ... When I say it is a quality I do not mean that it "inheres" in a subject ... The whole content of consciousness is made up of qualities of feeling, as truly as the whole of space is made up of points, or the whole of time by instants".
- Secondness (Reaction): "This is present even in such a rudimentary fragment of experience as a simple feeling ... an action and reaction between our soul and the stimulus ... The idea of second is predominant in the ideas of causation and of statical force ... the real is active; we acknowledge it by calling it the actual".
- Thirdness (Meaning): "Thirdness is essentially of a general nature ... ideas in which thirdness predominate [include] the idea of a sign or representation ... Every genuine triadic relation involves meaning ... the idea of meaning is irreducible to those of quality and reaction ... synthetical consciousness is the consciousness of a third or medium".

Although Peirce's three categories correspond to the three concepts of relation given in Kant's tables, the sequence is now reversed and follows that given by Hegel, and indeed before Hegel of the three moments of the world-process given by Plotinus. Later, Peirce gave a mathematical reason for there being three categories in that although monadic, dyadic and triadic nodes are irreducible, every node of a higher valency is reducible to a "compound of triadic relations". Ferdinand de Saussure, who was developing "semiology" in France just as Peirce was developing "semiotics" in the US, likened each term of a proposition to "the centre of a constellation, the point where other coordinate terms, the sum of which is indefinite, converge".

=== Others ===
Edmund Husserl (1962, 2000) wrote extensively about categorial systems as part of his phenomenology.

For Gilbert Ryle (1949), a category (in particular a "category mistake") is an important semantic concept, but one having only loose affinities to an ontological category.

Contemporary systems of categories have been proposed by John G. Bennett (The Dramatic Universe, 4 vols., 1956–65), Wilfrid Sellars (1974), Reinhardt Grossmann (1983, 1992), Johansson (1989), Hoffman and Rosenkrantz (1994), Roderick Chisholm (1996), Barry Smith (ontologist) (2003), and Jonathan Lowe (2006).

== See also ==
- Categories (Aristotle)
- Categories (Peirce)
- Categories (Stoic)
- Category (Kant)
- Metaphysics
- Modal logic
- Ontology
- Schema (Kant)
- Similarity (philosophy)

== Selected bibliography ==
- Aristotle, 1953. Metaphysics. Ross, W. D., trans. Oxford University Press.
- --------, 2004. Categories, Edghill, E. M., trans. Uni. of Adelaide library.
- John G. Bennett, 1956–1965. The Dramatic Universe. London, Hodder & Stoughton.
- Gustav Bergmann, 1992. New Foundations of Ontology. Madison: Uni. of Wisconsin Press.
- Browning, Douglas, 1990. Ontology and the Practical Arena. Pennsylvania State Uni.
- Butchvarov, Panayot, 1979. Being qua Being: A Theory of Identity, Existence, and Predication. Indiana Uni. Press.
- Roderick Chisholm, 1996. A Realistic Theory of Categories. Cambridge Uni. Press.
- Feibleman, James Kern, 1951. Ontology. The Johns Hopkins Press (reprinted 1968, Greenwood Press, Publishers, New York).
- Grossmann, Reinhardt, 1983. The Categorial Structure of the World. Indiana Uni. Press.
- Grossmann, Reinhardt, 1992. The Existence of the World: An Introduction to Ontology. Routledge.
- Haaparanta, Leila and Koskinen, Heikki J., 2012. Categories of Being: Essays on Metaphysics and Logic. New York: Oxford University Press.
- Hoffman, J., and Rosenkrantz, G. S.,1994. Substance among other Categories. Cambridge Uni. Press.
- Edmund Husserl, 1962. Ideas: General Introduction to Pure Phenomenology. Boyce Gibson, W. R., trans. Collier.
- ------, 2000. Logical Investigations, 2nd ed. Findlay, J. N., trans. Routledge.
- Johansson, Ingvar, 1989. Ontological Investigations. Routledge, 2nd ed. Ontos Verlag 2004.
- Kahn, Charles H., 2009. Essays on Being, Oxford University Press.
- Immanuel Kant, 1998. Critique of Pure Reason. Guyer, Paul, and Wood, A. W., trans. Cambridge Uni. Press.
- Charles Sanders Peirce, 1992, 1998. The Essential Peirce, vols. 1,2. Houser, Nathan et al., eds. Indiana Uni. Press.
- Gilbert Ryle, 1949. The Concept of Mind. Uni. of Chicago Press.
- Wilfrid Sellars, 1974, "Toward a Theory of the Categories" in Essays in Philosophy and Its History. Reidel.
- Barry Smith, 2003. "Ontology" in Blackwell Guide to the Philosophy of Computing and Information. Blackwell.
