= Category (Kant) =

Pure concept of the understanding in Kantian philosophy

In the philosophy of Immanuel Kant, a category (Template:Lang-de; in Kant's original 18th-century spelling: Categorie) is a pure concept of the understanding (reiner Verstandesbegriff) that operates a priori within human cognition. Following the classical philosophical tradition of Aristotle, Kant adopted the term "category" to designate the most fundamental concepts that apply to objects of intuition in general prior to any specific empirical experience.

Kant defines the categories as "concepts of an object in general, by means of which its intuition is regarded as determined with regard to one of the logical functions for judgments." Rather than being empirical properties abstracted from sensory experience, Kantian categories are active, structural rules of synthesis contributed by the faculty of understanding (Verstand). Their function is to organize, unite, and transform the chaotic manifold of raw sensory intuitions into a coherent, objective world of experience. Without categories, sensory perceptions would remain disjointed, blind, and meaningless, as expressed in Kant's famous epistemological dictum:

Thoughts without content are empty, intuitions without concepts are blind.

— Immanuel Kant, Critique of Pure Reason (A 51 / B 75)

Consequently, the categories serve as the necessary conditions of possibility (Bedingungen der Möglichkeit) for any object of empirical experience whatsoever. Kant establishes twelve distinct categories, systematically arranged into four classes: Quantity, Quality, Relation, and Modality. The first two classes (Quantity and Quality) are classified as "mathematical categories" because they apply directly to the objects of intuition themselves; the latter two classes (Relation and Modality) are termed "dynamical categories" because they govern the existence of objects either in relation to one another or in relation to the knowing subject.

== Etymology and historical background ==
The term "category" derives from the Ancient Greek κατηγορία (katēgoria), originally signifying a public accusation or legal charge in an assembly, and later broadened in logic to mean "predication"—that which can be affirmed or asserted of a subject. In traditional metaphysics, categories denote the highest genera (summa genera) or ultimate predicates under which all entities and properties can be classified. Kant described categories as "ontological predicates" (ontologische Prädikate) that articulate the fundamental conceptual framework through which thinking about objects is possible.

=== Comparison with Aristotle ===
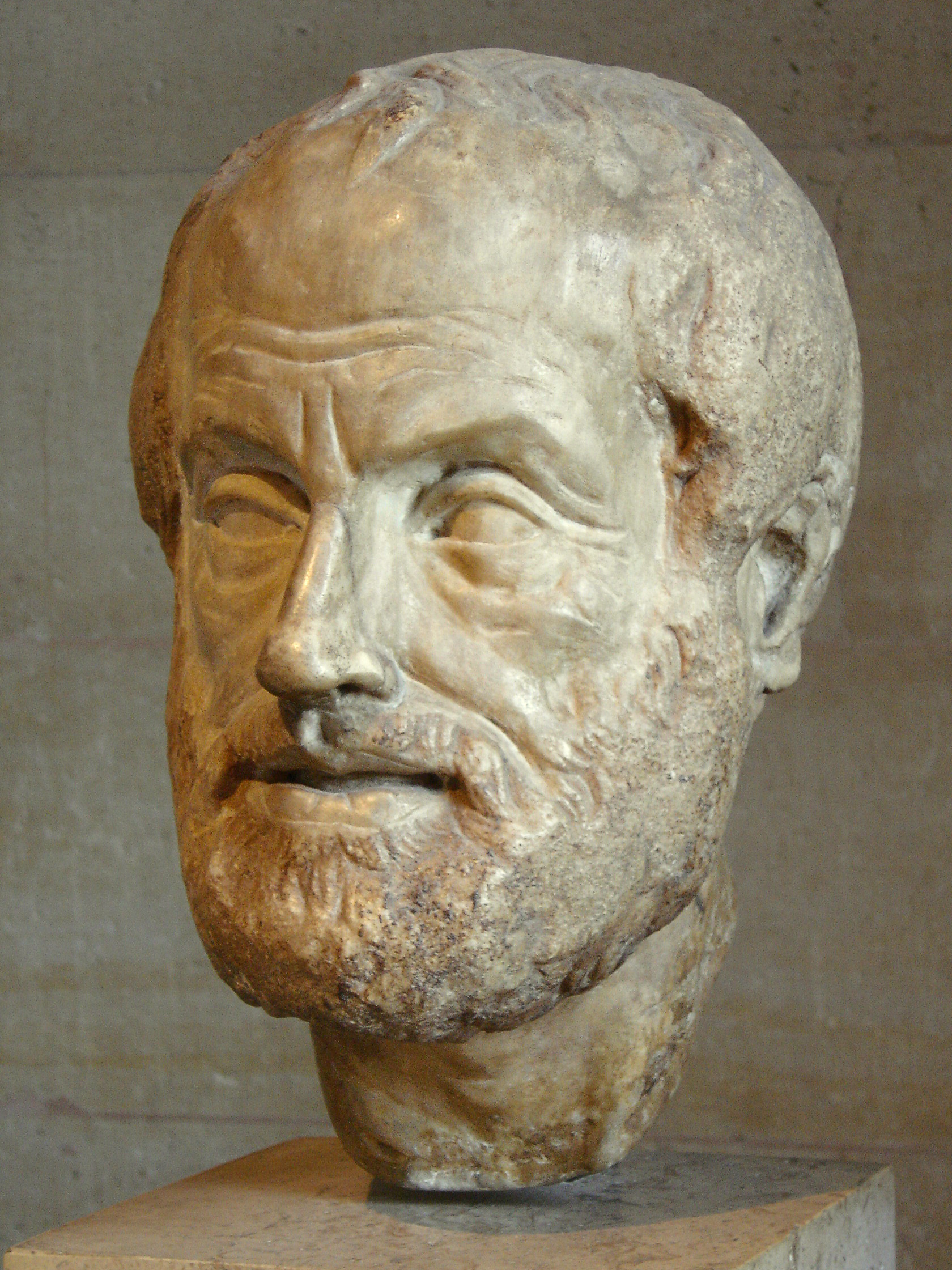
Ancient Greek philosopher Aristotle (384–322 BC), pioneer of the classical doctrine of ten categories of being.

In his treatise Categories (Categoriae), Aristotle identified ten supreme predicates that can be affirmed of any being: substance (ousia), quantity (poson), quality (poion), relation (pros ti), place (pou), time (pote), position (keisthai), state (echein), action (poiein), and affection or passivity (paschein). Aristotle regarded categories ontologically, as an objective classification of real beings and their modes of existence in the world.

While acknowledging Aristotle's pioneering initiative, Kant launched a sharp methodological critique against his predecessor. According to Kant, Aristotle compiled his list haphazardly without any guiding principle (Leitfaden), merely "picking them up as they occurred to him" (da er keinen Leitfaden hatte, raffte er sie auf, wie sie ihm aufstießen). Kant argued that this lack of a systematic foundation led Aristotle to commit two major category mistakes:

1. Aristotle conflated pure concepts of the understanding (such as substance and relation) with pure forms of sensible intuition (such as space and time/place and date). In Kant's critical framework, space and time are not intellectual concepts, but a priori sensible forms investigated in the Transcendental Aesthetic.
2. Aristotle included empirical concepts (such as physical motion, position, and bodily posture) within a list intended to comprise fundamental, pure categories.

Instead of seeking categories through empirical induction or metaphysical speculation about things-in-themselves, Kant argued that pure concepts of the understanding must be systematically deduced from a single, unified cognitive faculty: the capacity of the human mind to make judgments (Urteilsvermögen).

== The guiding thread: Table of judgments ==
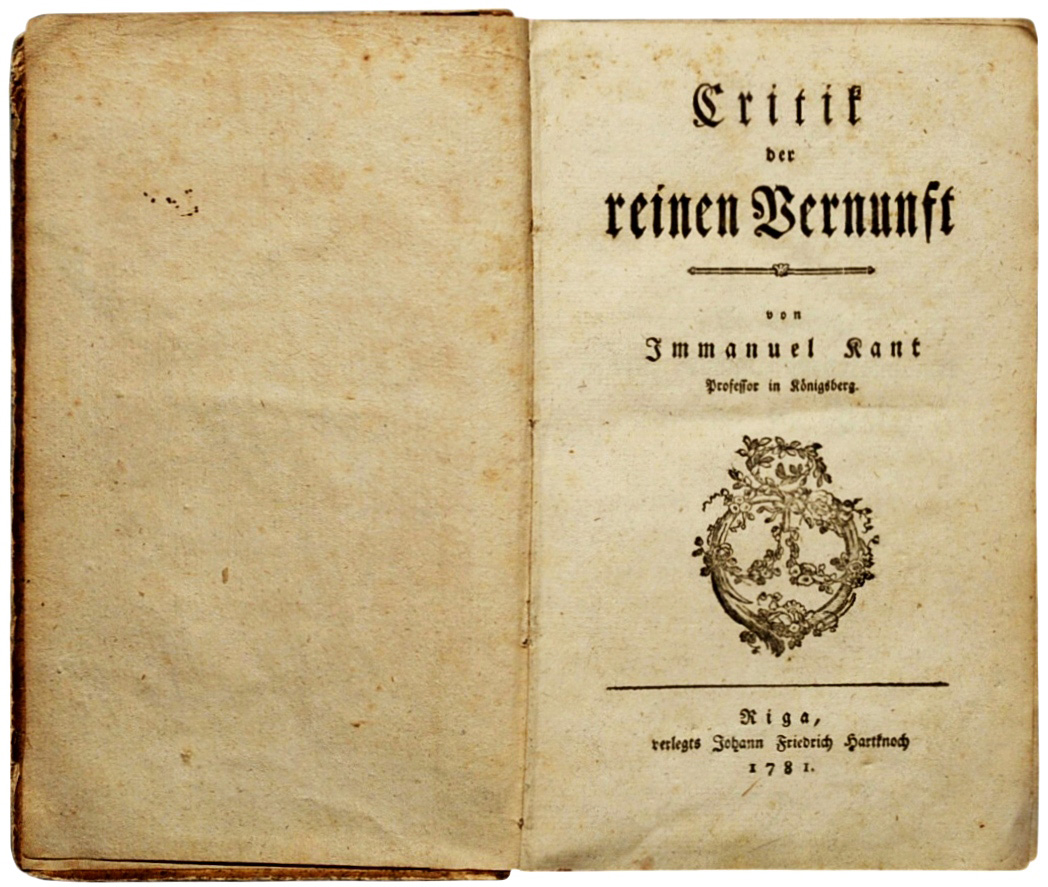
Title page of the first edition of the Critique of Pure Reason (Riga, 1781), in which Kant presented the tables of judgments and categories.

In the section titled "On the Clue to the Discovery of all Pure Concepts of the Understanding" (Von dem Leitfaden der Entdeckung aller reinen Verstandesbegriffe), Kant establishes a central epistemological thesis: to think is to judge (Denken ist Urteilen). The human understanding is a discursive faculty that cannot intuit objects directly; it can only think objects by bringing representations under concepts, and this unifying act is always executed through a logical judgment (Urteil).

Kant concluded that if all the fundamental logical functions of thought in judgments could be exhaustively cataloged, one would possess an exhaustive inventory of the pure concepts of the understanding. Drawing on the formal logic of his era, Kant organized the logical forms of judgment into four headings containing three moments each:

Table of Logical Functions of Judgment (Tafel der Urteile)
Quantity of Judgments (Quantität der Urteile)	Quality of Judgments (Qualität der Urteile)	Relation of Judgments (Relation der Urteile)	Modality of Judgments (Modalität der Urteile)
1. Universal (Allgemeine); All S are P	4. Affirmative (Bejahende); S is P	7. Categorical (Kategorische); S is P	10. Problematical (Problematische); S may be P
2. Particular (Besondere); Some S are P	5. Negative (Verneinende); S is not P	8. Hypothetical (Hypothetische); If S, then P	11. Assertoric (Assertorische); S is actually P
3. Singular (Einzelne); This S is P	6. Infinite (Unendliche); S is non-P	9. Disjunctive (Disjunktive); S is either P or Q	12. Apodictic (Apodiktische); S is necessarily P

Each logical function governs a specific aspect of propositional unity:

- In terms of Quantity, judgment determines the extension of the subject concept: whether the predicate applies to all instances (universal), some instances (particular), or a uniquely identified single subject (singular).
- In terms of Quality, judgment determines the propositional affirmation: asserting a relation (affirmative), denying a relation (negative), or placing a subject outside a class concept into an unbounded domain (infinite, e.g. "the human soul is non-mortal").
- In terms of Relation, judgment specifies the dependency between propositions: unconditional subject-predicate predication (categorical), conditional antecedent-consequent relation (hypothetical), or mutually exclusive and jointly exhaustive division of a logical sphere (disjunctive).
- In terms of Modality, judgment determines the cognitive status or epistemic assertion: expressing logical possibility (problematical), factual truth (assertoric), or unconditional rational necessity (apodictic).

== The table of categories ==
From the table of judgments, Kant derives the pure concepts of the understanding. The exact same mental function that gives unity to distinct representations within a formal logical judgment also imparts synthetic unity to the manifold of sensible intuition. This derivation constitutes Kant's Metaphysical Deduction (metaphysische Deduktion), yielding the Table of Categories (Tafel der Kategorien):

Table of the Pure Concepts of the Understanding (Tafel der Kategorien)
I. Of Quantity (der Quantität)	II. Of Quality (der Qualität)	III. Of Relation (der Relation)	IV. Of Modality (der Modalität)
1. Unity (Einheit); (Measure)	4. Reality (Realität); (Affirmative being)	7. Inherence and Subsistence; (Substance and Accident)	10. Possibility – Impossibility; (Möglichkeit – Unmöglichkeit)
2. Plurality (Vielheit); (Magnitude)	5. Negation (Negation); (Privation / Nothingness)	8. Causality and Dependence; (Cause and Effect)	11. Existence – Non-existence; (Dasein – Nichtsein)
3. Totality (Allheit / Totalität); (Wholeness)	6. Limitation (Limitation); (Bounded reality)	9. Community (Gemeinschaft); (Reciprocity / Interaction)	12. Necessity – Contingency; (Notwendigkeit – Zufälligkeit)

=== Architectonic structure ===
Kant highlights several systematic features of his categorical schema:

- Mathematical versus Dynamical Categories: The categories of Quantity and Quality are termed "mathematical" because they are concerned with objects of intuition (both pure and empirical), determining their spatial-temporal extension and intensive magnitude. In contrast, the categories of Relation and Modality are termed "dynamical" because they govern the existence (Dasein) of objects in relation to one another or to the cognitive faculty of the knowing subject.
- Triadic Dialectical Structure: In each of the four classes, the third category arises from the synthetic combination of the first and second categories:
  1. Totality is plurality regarded as a unified whole.
  2. Limitation is reality combined with and constrained by negation.
  3. Community (reciprocity) is the causality of substances determining one another simultaneously.
  4. Necessity is existence given through possibility itself.
  This triadic pattern exerted a profound influence on post-Kantian German idealism, anticipating the dialectical triad of thesis-antithesis-synthesis developed by Johann Gottlieb Fichte and G. W. F. Hegel.

== Primitive concepts (categories) and derivative concepts (predicables) ==
In the Critique of Pure Reason (A 81–82 / B 107–108), Kant clarifies that the twelve categories are strictly primitive concepts of the understanding (Stammbegriffe). Subordinated beneath these primary concepts are numerous derivative pure concepts, which he terms the Predicables of Pure Understanding (Prädikabilien des reinen Verstandes).

Predicables are generated by combining the primary categories with one another or by applying them to the pure forms of sensibility. Although Kant refrained from providing an exhaustive table of predicables in the Critique, he cited several representative examples:

- Under the category of Causality, are derived the predicables of "force" (Kraft), "action" (Handlung), and "passion" or "affection" (Leiden).
- Under the category of Community, are derived the predicables of "presence" or "coexistence" (Gegenwart) and "resistance" (Widerstand).
- Under the categories of Modality, are derived the predicables of "generation" or "coming-to-be" (Entstehen), "perishing" (Vergehen), and "alteration" (Veränderung).

This distinction allowed Kant to keep his primary categorical table compact and systematic, ensuring that derivative metaphysical concepts could be logically integrated without destabilizing the architectonic foundation of the understanding.

== Judgments of perception versus judgments of experience ==
In his introductory work, the Prolegomena to Any Future Metaphysics (1783, §§ 18–22), Kant provides a concrete epistemological illustration of how categories transform subjective sensory impressions into universally valid scientific knowledge. Kant draws a sharp distinction between two kinds of empirical judgments:

1. Judgments of Perception (Wahrnehmungsurteile)
  These judgments possess purely subjective validity, requiring only the associative connection of sensory impressions within a particular subject's consciousness at a given time. They do not presuppose pure concepts of the understanding and do not require the assent of other observers.
  - Example: "When the sun shines on the stone, it grows warm." This proposition merely records two sequential perceptions occurring together in a subjective state of consciousness, without asserting any necessary connection between them.
2. Judgments of Experience (Erfahrungsurteile)
  These judgments possess objective validity, claiming necessity and universal truth for all cognitive subjects at all times. A judgment of perception becomes a judgment of experience when sensory data are subsumed under a pure category of the understanding—in this case, the category of causality.
  - Example: "The sun warms the stone." Here, the intellect connects the sunshine as an objective cause (Ursache) and the warmth of the stone as its necessary effect (Wirkung).

This distinction demonstrates Kant's core contention against pure empiricism: scientific observation is never a passive reception of sensory impressions; rather, the understanding actively synthesizes perceptions by injecting a priori categorical rules that establish necessary, law-governed relationships.

== The transcendental deduction ==
Having mapped the twelve categories, Kant embarks on what he considered the most challenging and crucial task of the critical enterprise: demonstrating their objective validity with respect to objects of empirical experience. This demonstration is the Transcendental Deduction of the Categories (Transzendentale Deduktion der reinen Verstandesbegriffe).

Borrowing a distinction from contemporary Roman jurisprudence, Kant differentiates between two fundamental questions:

- Quid facti (the question of fact): How a concept is empirically or psychologically acquired through mental experience.
- Quid juris (the question of legal right): By what right or legitimate title human cognition applies concepts originating purely within the understanding to empirical objects given through external sensation.

The deduction was primarily intended to refute the radical skepticism of David Hume, who had argued that concepts such as cause and effect possess no rational necessity and are merely psychological fictions born of associative custom and habit.

=== The A Deduction (1781) versus the B Deduction (1787) ===
Kant formulated the Transcendental Deduction in two substantially different versions:

- The First Edition (A) Deduction: Kant pursues a transcendental-psychological investigation, analyzing the cognitive process through a threefold synthesis required for all possible knowledge:
  1. Synthesis of Apprehension in Intuition (Synthesis der Apprehension in der Anschauung): Ordering the temporal and spatial manifold of impressions into a unified perceptual image.
  2. Synthesis of Reproduction in Imagination (Synthesis der Reproduktion in der Einbildungskraft): Retaining and reproducing past impressions in consciousness so that they are not lost as new ones appear.
  3. Synthesis of Recognition in a Concept (Synthesis der Rekognition im Begriffe): Recognizing that what is currently represented is identical with what was previously perceived and reproduced, binding the manifold under a single conscious concept.
- The Second Edition (B) Deduction: Concerned that the A Deduction invited misinterpretation as an empirical psychological theory, Kant completely rewrote the chapter for the 1787 edition (B, §§ 15–27). The B Deduction centers entirely on the supreme principle of the Transcendental Unity of Apperception (the "I think" / Ich denke):
  1. All diverse sensory representations must be able to be accompanied by the single, identical self-consciousness: "The I think must be able to accompany all my representations."
  2. This synthetic unity cannot be passively provided by sensible intuition, but demands an active, unifying synthesis performed by the understanding.
  3. The rules governing this synthetic unification of the sensible manifold are precisely the twelve Categories of the Understanding.
  4. Therefore, without the categories, no unified self-consciousness, and consequently no coherent, objective experience of objects, would be possible. This establishes that the categories possess necessary, a priori objective validity for all possible appearances.

== Schematism: Bridging categories and sensibility ==
Although the Transcendental Deduction proves the objective validity of the categories, it leaves open a profound structural problem: how can purely abstract, non-sensible concepts of the understanding be applied to concrete, sensible appearances? Intellectual concepts and sensible intuitions are entirely heterogeneous.

Kant's solution is the doctrine of the Schematism of Pure Understanding (Der Schematismus der reinen Verstandesbegriffe). Kant argues that there must exist a mediating third term that is homogeneous with both the category and the appearance. This transcendental mediator is Time:

- Time is formal and a priori, making it homogeneous with the pure categories.
- Time is the universal form of inner sense that structures all empirical appearances, making it homogeneous with sensible phenomena.

The product of the productive imagination that determines time in accordance with a category is called a transcendental schema (transzendentales Schema). Through these temporal determinations, categories acquire their concrete empirical meaning:

- The schema of Substance is the permanence of the real in time (that which persists while accidental properties alter).
- The schema of Causality is the rule-governed succession of the manifold in time (event B always and irreversibly follows event A).
- The schema of Community (Reciprocity) is the coexistence or simultaneity of substances in time.
- The schema of Possibility is the harmony of a representation with the conditions of time in general.
- The schema of Actuality (Existence) is existence at a determinate, actual time.
- The schema of Necessity is the existence of an object throughout all time.

== System of principles of pure understanding ==
The culmination of the Transcendental Analytic is the System of All Principles of Pure Understanding (System aller Grundsätze des reinen Verstandes). These principles are the supreme synthetic a priori judgments that provide the foundational laws of pure natural science (reine Naturwissenschaft) and determine the general conditions of nature as phenomenal reality:

1. Axioms of Intuition (Axiome der Anschauung, based on Quantity)
  Principle: All intuitions are extensive magnitudes (extensive Größen). Every object appearing in space and time is necessarily experienced as a composite aggregate of parts, rendering geometry and mathematics universally applicable to nature.
2. Anticipations of Perception (Antizipationen der Wahrnehmung, based on Quality)
  Principle: In all appearances, sensation and the real that corresponds to it has intensive magnitude (intensive Größe), meaning a degree of reality between zero (complete void or absence) and any given intensity.
3. Analogies of Experience (Analogien der Erfahrung, based on Relation)
  Principle: Experience is possible only through the representation of a necessary connection of perceptions:
  - First Analogy (Permanence of Substance): In all change of appearances, substance is permanent, and its quantum in nature is neither increased nor diminished.
  - Second Analogy (Principle of Temporal Succession according to the Law of Causality): All alterations occur in accordance with the law of cause and effect.
  - Third Analogy (Principle of Simultaneity according to the Law of Reciprocity): All substances, insofar as they can be perceived in space as simultaneous, are in thoroughgoing interaction.
4. Postulates of Empirical Thinking in General (Postulate des empirischen Denkens überhaupt, based on Modality)
  Defines the operational criteria for empirical possibility, actuality, and necessity:
  - Possibility (Möglichkeit): That which agrees with the formal conditions of experience (intuition and concepts).
  - Actuality (Wirklichkeit): That which is connected with the material conditions of experience (sensation).
  - Necessity (Notwendigkeit): That whose connection with the actual is determined according to general conditions of experience (causal laws).

== Categories of freedom in practical reason ==
In the Critique of Practical Reason (1788), Kant extends his categorical theory into the domain of moral philosophy. Under the chapter "On the Concept of an Object of Pure Practical Reason", he outlines the Twelve Categories of Freedom relatively to the concepts of good and evil.

While the categories of theoretical reason determine physical nature deterministically according to laws of appearance, the categories of freedom function practically to determine the human will (Wille) in the realm of action. They govern how subjective maxims are brought into conformity with the universal moral law (categorical imperative). The categories of freedom are similarly arranged into four headings: Quantity (from subjective maxims to objective moral laws), Quality (practical rules of action, omission, and exception), Relation (duties to personality, to others, and reciprocal relations), and Modality (the permitted, duty, and perfect versus imperfect duty).

== Philosophical reception and criticisms ==
Kant's doctrine of the categories and their transcendental deduction has stood as one of the most vigorously debated topics in Western philosophy:

- Arthur Schopenhauer: In the appendix to The World as Will and Representation ("Criticism of the Kantian Philosophy", 1819), Schopenhauer praised Kant's distinction between appearances and things-in-themselves but launched a severe attack on the twelve categories. Schopenhauer argued that Kant's elaborate architectonic was a forced symmetrical construction ("a symmetrical architectural layout for its own sake"). He contended that eleven of the categories were artificial, redundant constructs, and that only one pure concept of the understanding actually exists: Causality. For Schopenhauer, causality—operating intrinsically in union with space and time—is entirely sufficient to generate the world of empirical representation.
- G. W. F. Hegel: Hegel applauded Kant for reviving the investigation of categories as central to metaphysics, but rejected Kant's dualistic separation between subjective mental categories and unknowable "things-in-themselves" (Dinge an sich). In the Science of Logic (1812), Hegel dynamicized the categories, transforming them from static forms of subjective human cognition into objective, dialectical stages through which the Absolute Idea unfolds itself in reality.
- P. F. Strawson: In his seminal work The Bounds of Sense (1966), British analytical philosopher P. F. Strawson reconstructed Kant's argument within contemporary philosophy of mind and language. Strawson discarded Kant's transcendental idealism and doctrine of noumena as unviable, while defending the core argument of the Transcendental Deduction: that any coherent, self-conscious experience of an objective world necessarily presupposes a unified spatiotemporal framework of re-identifiable particulars governed by basic concepts of objects and causality.
- Martin Heidegger: In Kant and the Problem of Metaphysics (1929), Heidegger argued that Kant's critical philosophy was not primarily an epistemology or philosophy of science, but a foundational laying of the ground for metaphysics (fundamental ontology). Heidegger identified the Transcendental Deduction and the Schematism—especially the central role of time and the transcendental imagination—as an implicit discovery of temporality as the fundamental horizon of Being.

== See also ==
- Categories (Aristotle)
- Categories (Stoic)
- Category of being
- Critique of Pure Reason
- Categorical imperative
- A priori and a posteriori
- Condition of possibility
- Transcendental idealism
- Intuition (philosophy)

== Bibliography ==
- Allison, Henry E. (2004). Kant's Transcendental Idealism: An Interpretation and Defense (revised and enlarged ed.). New Haven: Yale University Press. ISBN 978-0-300-10266-6.
- Guyer, Paul (2006). Kant. London & New York: Routledge. ISBN 978-0-415-28335-9.
- Heidegger, Martin (1997) [1929]. Kant and the Problem of Metaphysics. Translated by Richard Taft (5th enlarged ed.). Bloomington: Indiana University Press. ISBN 978-0-253-21067-8.
- Kant, Immanuel (1998) [1781]. Paul Guyer and Allen W. Wood (ed.). Critique of Pure Reason. Translated by Paul Guyer and Allen W. Wood. Cambridge: Cambridge University Press. ISBN 978-0-521-65729-7.
- Kant, Immanuel (2000) [1790]. Paul Guyer (ed.). Critique of the Power of Judgment. Translated by Paul Guyer and Eric Matthews. Cambridge: Cambridge University Press. ISBN 978-0-521-34892-8.
- Kant, Immanuel (2002) [1783]. Gary Hatfield (ed.). Prolegomena to Any Future Metaphysics That Will Be Able to Come Forward as Science. Translated by Gary Hatfield. Cambridge: Cambridge University Press. ISBN 978-0-521-82824-6.
- Kant, Immanuel (2015) [1788]. Mary Gregor (ed.). Critique of Practical Reason. Translated by Mary Gregor. Cambridge: Cambridge University Press. ISBN 978-1-107-46487-2.
- Longuenesse, Béatrice (1998). Kant and the Capacity to Judge: Sensibility and Discursivity in the Transcendental Analytic of the Critique of Pure Reason. Princeton: Princeton University Press. ISBN 978-0-691-01588-0.
- Mill, John Stuart (1882) [1843]. A System of Logic, Ratiocinative and Inductive (8 ed.). New York: Harper & Brothers.
- Palmquist, Stephen (1993). Kant's System of Perspectives: An Architectonic Interpretation of the Critical Philosophy. Lanham: University Press of America. ISBN 978-0-8191-8927-1.
- Schopenhauer, Arthur (1969) [1819]. The World as Will and Representation. Vol. 1. Translated by E. F. J. Payne. New York: Dover Publications. ISBN 978-0-486-21761-1.
- Strawson, P. F. (1966). The Bounds of Sense: An Essay on Kant's Critique of Pure Reason. London: Methuen & Co. pp. 72–85. ISBN 978-0-416-83560-1.
