= Hard problem of consciousness =

Philosophical problem about why neural processes give rise to inner experience at all

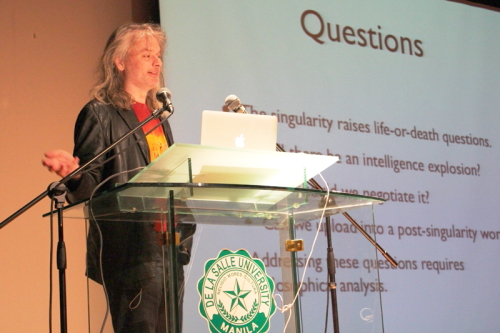
David Chalmers on stage for an Alan Turing Year event at De La Salle University, Manila, 27 March 2012

In philosophy of mind, the hard problem of consciousness (or simply the hard problem) is to explain how and why organisms have qualia, phenomenal consciousness, or subjective experience. It is contrasted with the "easy problems" of explaining why and how physical systems give rise to the ability to discriminate, to integrate information, and to perform behavioural functions such as watching, listening, speaking (including generating an utterance that appears to refer to personal behaviour or belief), and so forth. The easy problems are amenable to functional explanation—that is, explanations that are mechanistic or behavioural—since each physical system can be explained purely by reference to the "structure and dynamics" that underpin the phenomenon.

Proponents of the hard problem hold that it is categorically different from the easy problems since no mechanistic or behavioural explanation could explain the character of an experience, not even in principle. Even after all the relevant functional facts are explicated, they argue, there will still remain a further question: "Why is the performance of these functions accompanied by experience?" To bolster their case, proponents of the hard problem frequently turn to various philosophical thought experiments, involving philosophical zombies, or inverted qualia, or the ineffability of colour experiences, or the unknowability of foreign states of consciousness, such as the experience of being a bat.

The terms "hard problem" and "easy problems" were coined by the philosopher David Chalmers in a 1994 talk given at The Science of Consciousness conference held in Tucson, Arizona. The following year, the main talking points of Chalmers' talk were published in The Journal of Consciousness Studies. The publication gained significant attention from consciousness researchers and became the subject of a special volume of the journal, which was later published as a book. In 1996, Chalmers published The Conscious Mind, a book-length treatment of the hard problem, in which he elaborated on his core arguments and responded to counterarguments. His use of the word easy is "tongue-in-cheek". As the cognitive psychologist Steven Pinker puts it, they are about as easy as going to Mars or curing cancer. "That is, scientists more or less know what to look for, and with enough brainpower and funding, they would probably crack it in this century."

The existence of the hard problem is disputed. It has been accepted by some philosophers of mind such as Joseph Levine, Colin McGinn, and Ned Block and cognitive neuroscientists such as Francisco Varela, Giulio Tononi, and Christof Koch. On the other hand, its existence is rejected by other philosophers of mind, such as Daniel Dennett, Massimo Pigliucci, Thomas Metzinger, Patricia Churchland, and Keith Frankish, and by cognitive neuroscientists such as Stanislas Dehaene, Bernard Baars, Anil Seth, and Antonio Damasio. Clinical neurologist and sceptic Steven Novella has dismissed it as "the hard non-problem". According to a 2020 PhilPapers survey, a majority (62.4%) of the philosophers surveyed said they believed that the hard problem is a genuine problem, while 29.7% said that it does not exist.

There are a number of other potential philosophical problems that are related to the hard problem. Ned Block believes that there exists a "harder problem of consciousness", due to the possibility of different physical and functional neurological systems potentially having phenomenal overlap. Another potential philosophical problem which is closely related to Benj Hellie's vertiginous question, dubbed "The Even Harder Problem of Consciousness", refers to why a given individual has their own particular personal identity, as opposed to existing as someone else. Finally, proposals in the 2020s have been made to reconcile views from neuroscience and the philosophy of mind from a representationalist perspective. This holds in particular for a cognitively inspired form of representationalism, which is presumed to offer a favourable perspective for bridging gaps between different views in cognitive neuroscience and the philosophy of mind, relating to concepts such as intentionality, emergence, consciousness, and qualia.

== Overview ==
Cognitive scientist David Chalmers first formulated the hard problem in his 1995 paper, "Facing up to the problem of consciousness", and expanded upon it in The Conscious Mind (1996). His works provoked comment. Some, such as philosopher David Lewis and Steven Pinker, have praised Chalmers for his argumentative rigour and "impeccable clarity". In 2018, Pinker said: "In the end I still think that the hard problem is a meaningful conceptual problem, but agree with Dennett that it is not a meaningful scientific problem. No one will ever get a grant to study whether you are a zombie or whether the same Captain Kirk walks on the deck of the Enterprise and the surface of Zakdorn. And I agree with several other philosophers that it may be futile to hope for a solution at all, precisely because it is a conceptual problem, or, more accurately, a problem with our concepts." Daniel Dennett and Patricia Churchland, among others, believe that the hard problem is best seen as a collection of easy problems that will be solved through further analysis of the brain and behaviour. Consciousness is an ambiguous term. It can be used to mean self consciousness, awareness, the state of being awake, and so on. Chalmers uses Thomas Nagel's definition of consciousness as "the feeling of what it is like to be something". In this sense, consciousness is synonymous with experience.

=== Chalmers' formulation ===
. . .even when we have explained the performance of all the cognitive and behavioral functions in the vicinity of experience—perceptual discrimination, categorization, internal access, verbal report—there may still remain a further unanswered question: Why is the performance of these functions accompanied by experience?

— David Chalmers, Facing up to the problem of consciousness

The problems of consciousness, Chalmers argues, are of two kinds: the easy problems and the hard problem.

==== Easy problems ====
The easy problems are amenable to reductive enquiry. They are a logical consequence of lower-level facts about the world, similar to how a clock's ability to tell time is a logical consequence of its clockwork and structure, or a hurricane being a logical consequence of the structures and functions of certain weather patterns. A clock, a hurricane, and the easy problems, are all the sum of their parts (as are most things). The easy problems relevant to consciousness concern mechanistic analysis of the neural processes that accompany behaviour. Examples of these include how sensory systems work, how sensory data is processed in the brain, how that data influences behaviour or verbal reports, the neural basis of thought and emotion, and so on. They are problems that can be analysed through "structures and functions".

==== Hard problem ====
The hard problem, in contrast, is the problem of why and how those processes are accompanied by experience. It may further include the question of why these processes are accompanied by this or that particular experience, rather than some other kind of experience. In other words, the hard problem is the problem of explaining why certain mechanisms are accompanied by conscious experience. For example, why should neural processing in the brain lead to the felt sensations of, say, feelings of hunger? And why should those neural firings lead to feelings of hunger rather than some other feeling (such as, for example, feelings of thirst)? Chalmers argues that it is conceivable that the relevant behaviours associated with hunger, or any other feeling, could occur even in the absence of that feeling. This suggests that experience is irreducible to physical systems such as the brain. This is the topic of the next section.

==== How the easy and hard problems are related ====
Chalmers believes that the hard problem is irreducible to the easy problems: solving the easy problems will not lead to a solution to the hard problem. This is because the easy problems pertain to the causal structure of the world while the hard problem pertains to consciousness, and facts about consciousness include facts that go beyond mere causal or structural description.

For example, suppose someone were to stub their foot and yelp. In this scenario, the easy problems are mechanistic explanations that involve the activity of the nervous system and brain and its relation to the environment (such as the propagation of nerve signals from the toe to the brain, the processing of that information and how it leads to yelping, and so on). The hard problem is the question of why these mechanisms are accompanied by the feeling of pain, or why these feelings of pain feel the particular way that they do. Chalmers argues that facts about the neural mechanisms of pain, and pain behaviours, do not lead to facts about conscious experience. Facts about conscious experience are, instead, further facts, not derivable from facts about the brain.

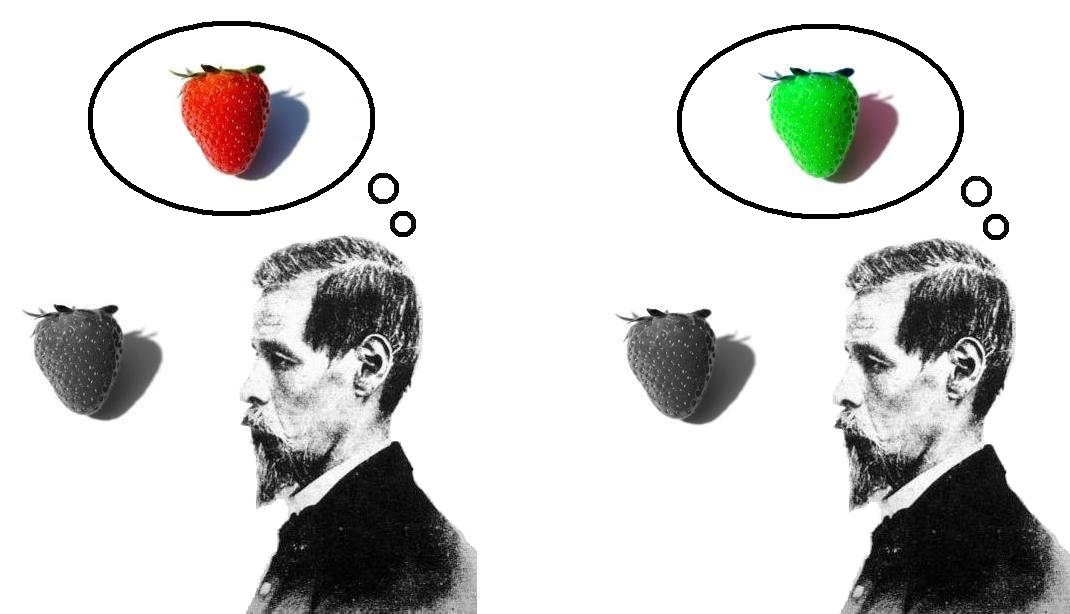
The hard problem is often illustrated by appealing to the logical possibility of inverted visible spectra. If there is no logical contradiction in supposing that one's colour vision could be inverted, it follows that mechanistic explanations of visual processing do not determine facts about what it is like to see colours.

An explanation for all of the relevant physical facts about neural processing would leave unexplained facts about what it is like to feel pain. This is in part because functions and physical structures of any sort could conceivably exist in the absence of experience. Alternatively, they could exist alongside a different set of experiences. For example, it is logically possible for a perfect replica of Chalmers to have no experience at all, or for it to have a different set of experiences (such as an inverted visible spectrum, so that the blue-yellow red-green axes of its visual field are flipped).

The same cannot be said about clocks, hurricanes, or other physical things. In those cases, a structural or functional description is a complete description. A perfect replica of a clock is a clock, a perfect replica of a hurricane is a hurricane, and so on. The difference is that physical things are nothing more than their physical constituents. For example, water is nothing more than H_{2}O molecules, and understanding everything about H_{2}O molecules is to understand everything there is to know about water. But consciousness is not like this. Knowing everything there is to know about the brain, or any physical system, is not to know everything there is to know about consciousness. Consciousness, then, must not be purely physical.

==== Implications for physicalism ====
A swarm of birds showing high order structure reducible to simpler physical constituents

Chalmers's idea contradicts physicalism, sometimes labelled materialism. This is the view that everything that exists is a physical or material thing, so everything can be reduced to microphysical things. For example, the rings of Saturn are a physical thing because they are nothing more than a complex arrangement of a large number of subatomic particles interacting in a certain way. According to physicalism, everything, including consciousness, can be explained by appeal to its microphysical constituents. Chalmers's hard problem presents a counterexample to this view, since it suggests that consciousness cannot be reductively explained by appealing to its physical constituents. Chalmers argues that if the hard problem is a genuine obstacle, it follows that physicalism must be false. Conversely, if physicalism is true, the hard problem cannot be a real problem.

Although Chalmers rejects physicalism, he is still a naturalist. He proposes that consciousness is a fundamental feature of the natural world, not something supernatural, and seeks a nonreductive explanation within a naturalistic framework.

Christian List argues that the existence of first-person perspectives and the inability for physicalism to answer Hellie's vertiginous question is evidence against physicalism, since first-personal facts cannot supervene on physical third-personal facts. List also claims that there exists a "quadrilemma" for metaphysical theories of consciousness, and that for the metaphysical claims of first-person realism, non-solipsism, non-fragmentation, and one-world, at least one of these must be false. List has proposed a model he calls the "many-worlds theory of consciousness" in order to reconcile the subjective nature of consciousness without lapsing into solipsism.

=== Historical precedents ===
The hard problem of consciousness has scholarly antecedents considerably earlier than Chalmers. Chalmers himself notes that "a number of thinkers in the recent and distant past" have "recognised the particular difficulties of explaining consciousness." He states that all his original 1996 paper contributed to the discussion was "a catchy name, a minor reformulation of philosophically familiar points". Among others, thinkers who have made arguments similar to Chalmers' formulation of the hard problem include Isaac Newton, John Locke, Gottfried Wilhelm Leibniz, John Stuart Mill, and Thomas Henry Huxley. Likewise, Asian philosophers like Dharmakirti and Guifeng Zongmi discussed the problem of how consciousness arises from unconscious matter. The Tattva Bodha, an eighth-century text attributed to Adi Shankara from the Advaita Vedanta school of Hinduism, describes consciousness being anubhati, or self-revealing, illuminating all objects of knowledge without itself being a material object.

=== Related concepts ===
==== Mind–body problem ====
The mind–body problem is the problem of how the mind and the body relate. The mind-body problem is more general than the hard problem of consciousness, since it is the problem of discovering how the mind and body relate in general, thereby implicating any theoretical framework that broaches the topic. The hard problem, in contrast, is often construed as a problem uniquely faced by physicalist or materialist theories of mind.

==== "What Is It Like to Be a Bat?" ====
The philosopher Thomas Nagel posited in his 1974 paper "What Is It Like to Be a Bat?" that experiences are essentially subjective (accessible only to the individual undergoing them—i.e., felt only by the one feeling them), while physical states are essentially objective (accessible to multiple individuals). So he argued we have no idea what it could mean to claim that an essentially subjective state just is an essentially non-subjective state (i.e., that a felt state is nothing but a functional state). In other words, we have no idea of what reductivism amounts to. He believes "every subjective phenomenon is essentially connected with a single point of view, and it seems inevitable that an objective, physical theory will abandon that point of view."

==== Explanatory gap ====
In 1983, the philosopher Joseph Levine proposed that there is an explanatory gap between our understanding of the physical world and our understanding of consciousness. Levine disputes that conscious states are reducible to neuronal or brain states. He uses the example of pain (as an example of a conscious state) and its reduction to the firing of c-fibers (a kind of nerve cell). The difficulty is as follows: even if consciousness is physical, it is not clear which physical states correspond to which conscious states. The bridges between the two levels of description will be contingent, rather than necessary. This is significant because in most contexts, relating two scientific levels of descriptions (such as physics and chemistry) is done with the assurance of necessary connections between the two theories (for example, chemistry follows with necessity from physics).

Levine illustrates this with a thought experiment: Suppose that humanity were to encounter an alien species, and suppose it is known that the aliens do not have any c-fiber. Even if one knows this, it is not obvious that the aliens do not feel pain: that would remain an open question. This is because the fact that aliens do not have c-fibers does not entail that they do not feel pain (in other words, feelings of pain do not follow with logical necessity from the firing of c-fibers). Levine thinks such thought experiments demonstrate an explanatory gap between consciousness and the physical world: even if consciousness is reducible to physical things, consciousness cannot be explained in terms of physical things, because the link between physical things and consciousness is a contingent link. Levine does not think that the explanatory gap means that consciousness is not physical; he is open to the idea that the explanatory gap is only an epistemological problem for physicalism. In contrast, Chalmers thinks that the hard problem of consciousness does show that consciousness is not physical.

==== Philosophical zombies ====
Philosophical zombies are a thought experiment commonly used in discussions of the hard problem. They are hypothetical beings physically identical to humans but that lack conscious experience. Philosophers such as Chalmers, Joseph Levine, and Saul Kripke take zombies as impossible within the bounds of nature but possible within the bounds of logic. This would imply that facts about experience are not logically entailed by the "physical" facts. Therefore, consciousness is irreducible. In Chalmers' words, "after God (hypothetically) created the world, he had more work to do." Daniel Dennett, a philosopher of mind, criticised the field's use of "the zombie hunch" which he deems an "embarrassment" that ought to "be dropped like a hot potato".

==== Knowledge argument ====
The knowledge argument, also known as Mary's Room, is another common thought experiment: A hypothetical neuroscientist named Mary has lived her whole life in a black-and-white room and has never seen colour before. She also happens to know everything there is to know about the brain and colour perception. Chalmers believes that when Mary sees the colour red for the first time, she gains new knowledge — the knowledge of "what red looks like" — which is distinct from, and irreducible to, her prior physical knowledge of the brain or visual system. A stronger form of the knowledge argument claims not merely that Mary would lack subjective knowledge of "what red looks like," but that she would lack knowledge of an objective fact about the world: namely, "what red looks like," a non-physical fact that can be learned only through direct experience (qualia). Others, such as Thomas Nagel, take a "physicalist" position, disagree with the argument in its stronger and/or weaker forms. For example, Nagel put forward a "speculative proposal" of devising a language that could "explain to a person blind from birth what it is like to see." The knowledge argument implies that such a language could not exist.

== Philosophical responses ==
A diagram showing the relationship between various views concerning the relationship between consciousness and the physical world

David Chalmers' formulation of the hard problem of consciousness provoked considerable debate within philosophy of mind, as well as scientific research. The hard problem is considered a problem primarily for physicalist views of the mind (the view that the mind is a physical object or process), since physical explanations tend to be functional, or structural. Because of this, some physicalists have responded to the hard problem by seeking to show that it dissolves upon analysis. Other researchers accept the problem as real and seek to develop a theory of consciousness' place in the world that can solve it, by either modifying physicalism or abandoning it in favour of an alternative ontology (such as panpsychism or dualism). A third response has been to accept the hard problem as real but deny human cognitive faculties can solve it.

PhilPapers is an organisation that archives academic philosophy papers and periodically surveys professional philosophers about their views. It can be used to gauge professional attitudes towards the hard problem. As of the 2020 survey results, it seems that the majority of philosophers (62.42%) agree that the hard problem is real, with a substantial minority that disagrees (29.76%).

Attitudes towards physicalism also differ among professionals. In the 2009 PhilPapers survey, 56.5% of philosophers surveyed subscribed to physicalism and 27.1% of philosophers surveyed rejected physicalism. 16.4% fell into the "other" category. In the 2020 PhilPapers survey, 51.93% of philosophers surveyed indicated that they "accept or lean towards" physicalism and 32.08% indicated that they reject physicalism. 6.23% were "agnostic" or "undecided". Different solutions have been proposed to the hard problem of consciousness. The sections below taxonomize the various responses to the hard problem. The shape of this taxonomy was first introduced by Chalmers in a 2003 literature review on the topic. The labelling convention of this taxonomy has been incorporated into the technical vocabulary of analytic philosophy, being used by philosophers such as Adrian Boutel, Raamy Majeed, Janet Levin, Pete Mandik & Josh Weisberg, Roberto Pereira, and Helen Yetter-Chappell.

=== Type-A materialism ===
Type-A materialism, also known as reductive materialism or a priori physicalism, is a view characterised by a commitment to physicalism and a full rejection of the hard problem. By this view, the hard problem either does not exist or is just another easy problem, because every fact about the mind is a fact about the performance of various functions or behaviours. As a result, once all the relevant functions and behaviours have been accounted for, there will not be any facts left over in need of explanation. Thinkers who subscribe to type-A materialism include Paul and Patricia Churchland, Daniel Dennett, Keith Frankish, and Thomas Metzinger. Some type-A materialists believe in the reality of phenomenal consciousness but believe it is nothing extra in addition to certain functions or behaviours. This view is sometimes referred to as strong reductionism. Other type-A materialists may reject the existence of phenomenal consciousness entirely. This view is referred to as eliminative materialism or illusionism.

==== Strong reductionism ====
Many philosophers have disputed that there is a hard problem of consciousness distinct from what Chalmers calls the easy problems of consciousness. Some among them, who are sometimes termed strong reductionists, hold that phenomenal consciousness (i.e., conscious experience) does exist but that it can be fully understood as reducible to the brain. Broadly, strong reductionists accept that conscious experience is real but argue it can be fully understood in functional terms as an emergent property of the material brain. In contrast to weak reductionists, strong reductionists reject ideas used to support the existence of a hard problem (that the same functional organization could exist without consciousness, or that a blind person who understood vision through a textbook would not know everything about sight) as simply mistaken intuitions.

A notable family of strong reductionist accounts are the higher-order theories of consciousness. In 2005, the philosopher Peter Carruthers wrote about "recognitional concepts of experience", that is, "a capacity to recognize [a] type of experience when it occurs in one's own mental life," and suggested that such a capacity could explain phenomenal consciousness without positing qualia. On the higher-order view, since consciousness is a representation, and representation is fully functionally analysable, there is no hard problem of consciousness.

The philosophers Glenn Carruthers and Elizabeth Schier said in 2012 that the main arguments for the existence of a hard problem—philosophical zombies, Mary's room, and Nagel's bats—are only persuasive if one already assumes that "consciousness must be independent of the structure and function of mental states, i.e. that there is a hard problem." Hence, the arguments beg the question. The authors suggest that "instead of letting our conclusions on the thought experiments guide our theories of consciousness, we should let our theories of consciousness guide our conclusions from the thought experiments." The philosopher Massimo Pigliucci argued in 2013 that the hard problem is misguided, resulting from a "category mistake". He said: "Of course an explanation isn't the same as an experience, but that's because the two are completely independent categories, like colors and triangles. It is obvious that I cannot experience what it is like to be you, but I can potentially have a complete explanation of how and why it is possible to be you."

In 2017, the philosopher Marco Stango, in a paper on John Dewey's approach to the problem of consciousness (which preceded Chalmers' formulation of the hard problem by over half a century), noted that Dewey's approach would see the hard problem as the consequence of an unjustified assumption that feelings and functional behaviours are not the same physical process: "For the Deweyan philosopher, the 'hard problem' of consciousness is a 'conceptual fact' only in the sense that it is a philosophical mistake: the mistake of failing to see that the physical can be had as an episode of immediate sentiency." The philosopher Thomas Metzinger likens the hard problem of consciousness to vitalism, a formerly widespread view in biology which was not so much solved as abandoned. Brian Jonathan Garrett has also argued that the hard problem suffers from flaws analogous to those of vitalism.

The philosopher Peter Hacker argues that the hard problem is misguided in that it asks how consciousness can emerge from matter, whereas in fact sentience emerges from the evolution of living organisms. He states: "The hard problem isn't a hard problem at all. The really hard problems are the problems the scientists are dealing with. ... The philosophical problem, like all philosophical problems, is a confusion in the conceptual scheme." Hacker's critique extends beyond Chalmers and the hard problem, being directed against contemporary philosophy of mind and neuroscience more broadly. Along with the neuroscientist Max Bennett, he has argued that most of contemporary neuroscience remains implicitly dualistic in its conceptualisations and is predicated on the mereological fallacy of ascribing psychological concepts to the brain that can properly be ascribed only to the person as a whole. Hacker further states that "consciousness studies", as it exists today, is "literally a total waste of time" and that "the conception of consciousness which they have is incoherent".

==== Eliminative materialism and illusionism ====
Eliminative materialism or eliminativism is the view that many or all of the mental states used in folk psychology (i.e., common-sense ways of discussing the mind) do not, upon scientific examination, correspond to real brain mechanisms. According the 2020 PhilPapers survey, 4.51% of philosophers surveyed subscribe to eliminativism. While Patricia Churchland and Paul Churchland have famously applied eliminative materialism to propositional attitudes, philosophers including Daniel Dennett, Georges Rey, and Keith Frankish have applied it to qualia or phenomenal consciousness (i.e., conscious experience). On their view, it is mistaken not only to believe there is a hard problem of consciousness, but to believe phenomenal consciousness exists at all.

In the 2010s, this stance took on the name of illusionism: the view that phenomenal consciousness is an illusion. The term was popularized by the philosopher Keith Frankish. Frankish argues that "illusionism" is preferable to "eliminativism" for labelling the view that phenomenal consciousness is an illusion. More substantively, Frankish argues that illusionism about phenomenal consciousness is preferable to realism about phenomenal consciousness. He states: "Theories of consciousness typically address the hard problem. They accept that phenomenal consciousness is real and aim to explain how it comes to exist. There is, however, another approach, which holds that phenomenal consciousness is an illusion and aims to explain why it seems to exist." Frankish concludes that illusionism "replaces the hard problem with the illusion problem—the problem of explaining how the illusion of phenomenality arises and why it is so powerful."

The philosopher Daniel Dennett was another prominent figure associated with illusionism. After Frankish published a paper in the Journal of Consciousness Studies titled Illusionism as a Theory of Consciousness, Dennett responded with his own paper humorously titled Illusionism as the Obvious Default Theory of Consciousness. Dennett had been arguing for the illusory status of consciousness since early on in his career. For example, in 1979 he published a paper titled On the Absence of Phenomenology (where he argues for the nonexistence of phenomenal consciousness). Similar ideas have been explicated in his 1991 book Consciousness Explained. Dennett argues that the so-called "hard problem" will be solved in the process of solving what Chalmers terms the "easy problems". He compares consciousness to stage magic and its capability to create extraordinary illusions out of ordinary things. To show how people might be commonly fooled into overstating the accuracy of their introspective abilities, he describes a phenomenon called change blindness, a visual process that involves failure to detect scenery changes in a series of alternating images. He accordingly argues that consciousness need not be what it seems to be based on introspection. To address the question of the hard problem, or how and why physical processes give rise to experience, Dennett states that the phenomenon of having experience is nothing more than the performance of functions or the production of behaviour, which can also be referred to as the easy problems of consciousness. Thus, Dennett argues that the hard problem of experience is included among—not separate from—the easy problems, and therefore they can only be explained together as a cohesive unit.

Eliminativists differ on the role they believe intuitive judgement plays in creating the apparent reality of consciousness. The philosopher Jacy Reese Anthis is of the position that this issue is born of an overreliance on intuition, calling philosophical discussions on the topic of consciousness a form of "intuition jousting". But when the issue is tackled with "formal argumentation" and "precise semantics" then the hard problem will dissolve. The philosopher Elizabeth Irvine, in contrast, can be read as having the opposite view, since she argues that phenomenal properties (that is, properties of consciousness) do not exist in our common-sense view of the world. She states that "the hard problem of consciousness may not be a genuine problem for non-philosophers (despite its overwhelming obviousness to philosophers)."

A complete illusionist theory of consciousness must include the description of a mechanism by which the illusion of subjective experience is had and reported by people. Various philosophers and scientists have proposed possible theories. For example, in his book Consciousness and the Social Brain neuroscientist Michael Graziano advocates what he calls attention schema theory, in which our perception of being conscious is merely an error in perception, held by brains which evolved to hold erroneous and incomplete models of their own internal workings, just as they hold erroneous and incomplete models of their own bodies and of the external world.

===== Criticisms =====
The main criticisms of eliminative materialism and illusionism hinge on the counterintuitive nature of the view. Arguments of this form are called Moorean Arguments. A Moorean argument seeks to undermine the conclusion of an argument by asserting that the negation of that conclusion is more certain than the premises of the argument. The roots of the Moorean Argument against illusionism extend back to Augustine of Hippo who stated that he could not be deceived regarding his own existence, since the very act of being deceived secures the existence of a being there to be the recipient of that deception. (Note: "But, without any delusive representations of images or phantasms, I am most certain that I am, and that I know and delight in this. In respect to these truths I am not at all afraid of the arguments of the Academians, who say, What if you are deceived? For if I am deceived, I am. For he who is not, cannot be deceived...") In the Early-Modern era, these arguments were repopularized by René Descartes, who coined the now famous phrase "Je pense, donc je suis" ("I think, therefore I am"). Descartes argued that even if he was maximally deceived (because, for example, an evil demon was manipulating all his senses) he would still know with certainty that his mind exists, because the state of being deceived requires a mind as a prerequisite.

This same general argumentative structure is still in use today. In 2002, David Chalmers published an explicitly Moorean argument against illusionism. The argument goes like this: The reality of consciousness is more certain than any theoretical commitments (to, for example, physicalism) that may be motivating the illusionist to deny the existence of consciousness. The reason for this is because we have direct "acquaintance" with consciousness, but we do not have direct acquaintance with anything else (including anything that could inform our beliefs in consciousness being an illusion). In other words: consciousness can be known directly, so the reality of consciousness is more certain than any philosophical or scientific theory that says otherwise. Chalmers concludes that "there is little doubt that something like the Moorean argument is the reason that most people reject illusionism and many find it crazy."

Eliminative materialism and illusionism have been the subject of criticism within the popular press. One highly cited example comes from the philosopher Galen Strawson who wrote an article in the New York Review of Books titled "The Consciousness Deniers". In it, Strawson describes illusionism as the "silliest claim ever made", next to which "every known religious belief is only a little less sensible than the belief that the grass is green." Another notable example comes from Christof Koch (a neuroscientist and one of the leading proponents of Integrated Information Theory) in his popular science book The Feeling of Life Itself. In the early pages of the book, Koch describes eliminativism as the "metaphysical counterpart to Cotard's syndrome, a psychiatric condition in which patients deny being alive." Koch takes the prevalence of eliminativism as evidence that "much of twentieth-century analytic philosophy has gone to the dogs".

Frankish has responded to such criticisms by asserting that "qualia realists" have to conceive of qualia as being either observational or theoretical in nature. If conceived of as observational, then realists cannot claim that illusionists are leaving anything out of their theories of consciousness, as such a claim would presuppose qualia as having certain theoretical components. If conceived of as theoretical, then illusionists are simply denying the theoretical components of qualia but not the mere fact that they exist, which is what they're attempting to explain in the first place.

=== Type-B materialism ===
Type-B materialism, also known as weak reductionism or a posteriori physicalism, is the view that the hard problem stems from human psychology, and is therefore not indicative of a genuine ontological gap between consciousness and the physical world. Like Type-A Materialists, Type-B Materialists are committed to physicalism. Unlike Type-A Materialists, however, Type-B Materialists do accept inconceivability arguments often cited in support of the hard problem, but with a key caveat: that inconceivability arguments give us insight only into how the human mind tends to conceptualize the relationship between mind and matter, but not into what the true nature of this relationship actually is. According to this view, there is a gap between two ways of knowing (introspection and neuroscience) that will not be resolved by understanding all the underlying neurobiology, but still believe that consciousness and neurobiology are one and the same in reality.

While Type-B Materialists all agree that intuitions about the hard problem are psychological rather than ontological in origin, they differ as to whether our intuitions about the hard problem are innate or culturally conditioned. This has been dubbed the "hard-wired/soft-wired distinction." In relation to Type-B Materialism, those who believe that our intuitions about the hard problem are innate (and therefore common to all humans) subscribe to the "hard-wired view". Those that believe our intuitions are culturally conditioned subscribe to the "soft-wired view". Unless otherwise specified, the term Type-B Materialism refers to the hard-wired view. Notable philosophers who subscribe to Type-B Materialism include David Papineau, Joseph Levine, and Janet Levine.

==== "Hard-wired view" ====
Joseph Levine (who formulated the notion of the explanatory gap) states: "The explanatory gap argument doesn't demonstrate a gap in nature, but a gap in our understanding of nature." He nevertheless contends that full scientific understanding will not close the gap, and that analogous gaps do not exist for other identities in nature, such as that between water and H_{2}O. The philosophers Ned Block and Robert Stalnaker agree that facts about what a conscious experience is like to the one experiencing it cannot be deduced from knowing all the facts about the underlying physiology, but by contrast argue that such gaps of knowledge are also present in many other cases in nature, such as the distinction between water and H_{2}O.

To explain why these two ways of knowing (i.e. third-person scientific observation and first-person introspection) yield such different understandings of consciousness, weak reductionists often invoke the phenomenal concepts strategy, which argues the difference stems from our inaccurate phenomenal concepts (i.e., how we think about consciousness), not from the nature of consciousness itself. By this view, the hard problem of consciousness stems from a dualism of concepts, not from a dualism of properties or substances.

==== "Soft-wired view" ====
Some consciousness researchers have argued that the hard problem is a cultural artifact, unique to contemporary Western culture. This is similar to Type-B Materialism, but it makes the further claim that the psychological facts that cause us to intuit the hard problem are not innate, but culturally conditioned. Notable researchers who hold this view include Anna Wierzbicka, Hakwan Lau and Matthias Michel. Wierzbicka (who is a linguist) argues that the vocabulary used by consciousness researchers (including words like experience and consciousness) are not universally translatable, and are "parochially English." Weirzbicka calls David Chalmers out by name for using these words, arguing that if philosophers "were to use panhuman concepts expressed in crosstranslatable words" (such as know, think, or feel) then the hard problem would dissolve. David Chalmers has responded to these criticisms by saying that he will not "apologise for using technical terms in an academic article . . . they play a key role in efficient communication in every discipline, including Wierzbicka's".

=== Type-C materialism ===
Type-C materialists acknowledge a distinction between knowledge and experience without asserting a more complete explanation for the experiential phenomenon. One taking this view would admit that there is an explanatory gap for which no answer to date may be satisfactory, but trust that inevitably the gap will be closed. This is described by analogy to progression in other areas of science, such as mass-energy equivalence which would have been unfathomable in ancient times, abiogenesis which was once considered paradoxical from an evolutionary framework, or a suspected future theory of everything combining relativity and quantum mechanics. Similarly, type-C materialism posits that the problem of consciousness is a consequence of our ignorance, but just as resolvable as any other question in neuroscience.

Because the explanatory question of consciousness is evaded, type-C materialism does not presuppose the descriptive question, for instance that there is any self-consciousness, wakefulness, or even sentience in a rock. Principally, the basis for the argument arises from the apparently high correlation of consciousness with living brain tissue, thereby rejecting panpsychism without explicitly formulating physical causation. More specifically this position denies the existence of philosophical zombies, for which there is an absence of data and no proposed method of testing. Whether via the inconceivability or actual nonexistence of zombies, a contradiction is exposed nullifying the premise of the consciousness problem's "hardness".

Type-C materialism is compatible with several cases and could collapse into one of these other metaphysical views depending on scientific discovery and its interpretation. With evidence of emergence, it resolves to strong reductionism under type A. With a different, possibly cultural paradigm for understanding consciousness, it resolves to type-B materialism. If consciousness is explained by the quantum mind, then it resolves to property dualism under type D. With characterisation of intrinsic properties in physics extending beyond structure and dynamics, it could resolve to type-F monism.

Richard Brown has defended an unorthodox form of type-C materialism which states that the hard problem cannot be decided a priori and the two major positions (physicalism and dualism) can only be vindicated empirically, i.e. through scientific advances. His version of type-C materialism is unorthodox because he claims that it does not collapse into the other positions. He uses "reverse zombie" and "reverse knowledge" thought experiments (anti-dualist versions of the standard anti-physicalist arguments) to show that a priori arguments beg the question and are only useful for revealing one's own intuitions, whether physicalist or dualist. The only reason why such thought experiments, both anti-physicalist and anti-dualist, seem intuitive is because they are prima facie conceivable but not ideally conceivable, where ideal conceivability involves knowledge of the completed science and thus the ability to deduce a priori the discovered identities, in the same way that "water is H₂O" was discovered empirically but the identity is deducible a priori.

=== Type-D and Type-E dualism ===
Dualism views consciousness as either a non-physical substance separate from the brain or a non-physical property of the physical brain. Dualism is the view that the mind is irreducible to the physical body. There are multiple dualist accounts of the causal relationship between the mental and the physical, of which interactionism and epiphenomenalism are the most common today. Interactionism posits that the mental and physical causally impact one another, and is associated with the thought of René Descartes (1596–1650). Epiphenomenalism holds the mental is causally dependent on the physical, but does not in turn causally impact it.

In contemporary philosophy, interactionism has been defended by philosophers including Martine Nida-Rümelin, while epiphenomenalism has been defended by philosophers including Frank Jackson, although Jackson later changed his stance to physicalism. Chalmers has also defended versions of both positions as plausible. Traditional dualists such as Descartes believed the mental and the physical to be two separate substances, or fundamental types of entities (hence "substance dualism"); however, 21st-century dualists accept only one substance (the physical) but state it has both mental and physical properties (hence "property dualism").

=== Type-F monism ===
Meanwhile, panpsychism and neutral monism, broadly speaking, view consciousness as intrinsic to matter. In its most basic form, panpsychism holds that all physical entities have minds (though its proponents take more qualified positions), while neutral monism, in at least some variations, holds that entities are composed of a substance with mental and physical aspects—and is thus sometimes described as a type of panpsychism.

Forms of panpsychism and neutral monism were defended in the early twentieth century by the psychologist William James, (Note: There has been debate over how best to characterize James' position. The Stanford Encyclopedia of Philosophy states: "James's commitment to panpsychism remains somewhat controversial, since he also advanced a cogent set of objections against a version of the view, which he labelled the 'mind dust' theory, in chapter six of The Principles of Psychology ([1890] 1981). These objections are the inspiration for the so-called 'combination problem', around which much of the twenty first century literature on panpsychism focuses.") the philosopher Alfred North Whitehead, the physicist Arthur Eddington, and the philosopher Bertrand Russell, and interest in these views has been revived in recent decades by philosophers including Thomas Nagel, Galen Strawson, Philip Goff, and David Chalmers. Chalmers describes his overall view as "naturalistic dualism", but he says panpsychism is in a sense a form of physicalism, as does Strawson. Proponents of panpsychism argue it solves the hard problem of consciousness parsimoniously by making consciousness a fundamental feature of reality.

==== Idealism and cosmopsychism ====
A traditional solution to the hard problem is idealism, according to which consciousness is fundamental and not simply an emergent property of matter. It is claimed that this avoids the hard problem entirely. Objective idealism and cosmopsychism consider mind or consciousness to be the fundamental substance of the universe. Proponents claim that this approach is immune to both the hard problem of consciousness and the combination problem that affects panpsychism. David Chalmers calls idealism one of "the handful of promising approaches to the mind–body problem."

From an idealist perspective, matter is a representation or image of mental processes. Supporters suggest that this avoids the problems associated with the materialist view of mind as an emergent property of a physical brain. Critics argue that this then leads to a decombination problem: how is it possible to split a single, universal conscious experience into multiple, distinct conscious experiences? In response, Bernardo Kastrup claims that nature hints at a mechanism for this in the condition dissociative identity disorder (previously known as Multiple Personality Disorder). Kastrup proposes dissociation as an example from nature showing that multiple minds with their own individual subjective experience could develop within a single universal mind.

Cognitive psychologist Donald D. Hoffman uses a mathematical model based around conscious agents, within a fundamentally conscious universe, to support conscious realism as a description of nature—one that falls within the objective idealism approaches to the hard problem: "The objective world, i.e., the world whose existence does not depend on the perceptions of a particular conscious agent, consists entirely of conscious agents."

=== New mysterianism ===
New mysterianism, most significantly associated with the philosopher Colin McGinn, proposes that the human mind, in its current form, will not be able to explain consciousness. McGinn draws on Noam Chomsky's distinction between problems, which are in principle solvable, and mysteries, which human cognitive faculties are unequipped to ever understand, and places the mind–body problem in the latter category. His position is that a naturalistic explanation does exist but that the human mind is cognitively closed to it due to its limited range of intellectual abilities. He cites Jerry Fodor's concept of the modularity of mind in support of cognitive closure.

While in McGinn's strong form, new mysterianism states that the relationship between consciousness and the material world can never be understood by the human mind, there are also weaker forms that argue it cannot be understood within existing paradigms but that advances in science or philosophy may open the way to other solutions. The ideas of Thomas Nagel and Joseph Levine fall into the second category. Steven Pinker has also endorsed this weaker version of the view, summarising it as follows:

And then there is the theory put forward by philosopher Colin McGinn that our vertigo when pondering the Hard Problem is itself a quirk of our brains. The brain is a product of evolution, and just as animal brains have their limitations, we have ours. Our brains can't hold a hundred numbers in memory, can't visualize seven-dimensional space and perhaps can't intuitively grasp why neural information processing observed from the outside should give rise to subjective experience on the inside. This is where I place my bet, though I admit that the theory could be demolished when an unborn genius—a Darwin or Einstein of consciousness—comes up with a flabbergasting new idea that suddenly makes it all clear to us.

=== Commentary on the problem's targets and assumptions ===
Philosopher Raamy Majeed argued in 2016 that the hard problem is associated with two "explanatory targets":

1. [PQ] Physical processing gives rise to experiences with a phenomenal character.
2. [Q] Our phenomenal qualities are thus-and-so.

The first fact concerns the relationship between the physical and the phenomenal (i.e., how and why are some physical states felt states), whereas the second concerns the very nature of the phenomenal itself (i.e., what does the felt state feel like?). Wolfgang Fasching argues that the hard problem is not about qualia, but about the what-it-is-like-ness of experience in Nagel's sense—about the givenness of phenomenal contents:

Today there is a strong tendency to simply equate consciousness with the qualia. Yet there is clearly something not quite right about this. The "itchiness of itches" and the "hurtfulness of pain" are qualities we are conscious of. So philosophy of mind tends to treat consciousness as if it consisted simply of the contents of consciousness (the phenomenal qualities), while it really is precisely consciousness of contents, the very givenness of whatever is subjectively given. And therefore the problem of consciousness does not pertain so much to some alleged "mysterious, nonpublic objects", i.e. objects that seem to be only "visible" to the respective subject, but rather to the nature of "seeing" itself (and in today's philosophy of mind astonishingly little is said about the latter).

Some papers in the 2020s have argued that the hard problem dissolves once its core conceptual assumption is challenged. Petko Binkov Dinev (2026) maintains that the problem rests on a false premise about the ontological primacy of physical structure, and Logan Ohm (2025) treats it as a philosophical artifact sustained by a linguistic framework that implicitly assumes dualism.

== Relationship to scientific frameworks ==
Most neuroscientists and cognitive scientists believe that Chalmers' alleged "hard problem" will be solved, or be shown to not be a real problem, in the course of the solution of the so-called "easy problems", although a significant minority disagrees.

=== Neural correlates of consciousness ===
Since 1990, researchers including the molecular biologist Francis Crick and the neuroscientist Christof Koch have made significant progress toward identifying which neurobiological events occur concurrently to the experience of subjective consciousness. These postulated events are referred to as neural correlates of consciousness or NCCs. However, this research arguably addresses the question of which neurobiological mechanisms are linked to consciousness but not the question of why they should give rise to consciousness at all, the latter being the hard problem of consciousness as Chalmers formulated it. In "On the Search for the Neural Correlate of Consciousness", Chalmers said he is confident that, granting the principle that something such as what he terms "global availability" can be used as an indicator of consciousness, the neural correlates will be discovered "in a century or two". Nevertheless, he stated regarding their relationship to the hard problem of consciousness:

One can always ask why these processes of availability should give rise to consciousness in the first place. As yet we cannot explain why they do so, and it may well be that full details about the processes of availability will still fail to answer this question. Certainly, nothing in the standard methodology I have outlined answers the question; that methodology assumes a relation between availability and consciousness, and therefore does nothing to explain it. ... So the hard problem remains. But who knows: Somewhere along the line we may be led to the relevant insights that show why the link is there, and the hard problem may then be solved.

The neuroscientist and Nobel laureate Eric Kandel wrote that locating the NCCs would not solve the hard problem, but rather one of the so-called easy problems to which the hard problem is contrasted. Kandel went on to note Crick and Koch's suggestion that once the binding problem—understanding what accounts for the unity of experience—is solved, it will be possible to solve the hard problem empirically. However, neuroscientist Anil Seth argued that emphasis on the so-called hard problem is a distraction from what he calls the "real problem": understanding the neurobiology underlying consciousness, namely the neural correlates of various conscious processes. This more modest goal is the focus of most scientists working on consciousness. Psychologist Susan Blackmore believes, by contrast, that the search for the neural correlates of consciousness is futile and itself predicated on an erroneous belief in the hard problem of consciousness.

=== Computational cognition ===
A functionalist view in cognitive science holds that the mind is an information processing system, and that cognition and consciousness together are a form of computation. Cognition, distinct from consciousness, is explained by neural computation in the computational theory of cognition. The computational theory of mind asserts that not only cognition, but also phenomenal consciousness or qualia, are computational. While the computation system is realised by neurons rather than electronics, in theory it would be possible for artificial intelligence to be conscious.

=== Integrated information theory ===
Integrated information theory (IIT), developed by the neuroscientist and psychiatrist Giulio Tononi in 2004 and more recently also advocated by Koch, is one of the most discussed models of consciousness in neuroscience and elsewhere. The theory proposes an identity between consciousness and integrated information, with the latter item (denoted as Φ) defined mathematically and thus in principle measurable. The hard problem of consciousness, write Tononi and Koch, may indeed be intractable when working from matter to consciousness. However, because IIT inverts this relationship and works from phenomenological axioms to matter, they say it could be able to solve the hard problem. In this vein, proponents have said the theory goes beyond identifying human neural correlates and can be extrapolated to all physical systems. Tononi wrote (along with two colleagues):

While identifying the "neural correlates of consciousness" is undoubtedly important, it is hard to see how it could ever lead to a satisfactory explanation of what consciousness is and how it comes about. As will be illustrated below, IIT offers a way to analyse systems of mechanisms to determine if they are properly structured to give rise to consciousness, how much of it, and of which kind.

As part of a broader critique of IIT, Michael Cerullo suggested that the theory's proposed explanation is in fact for what he dubs (following Scott Aaronson) the "Pretty Hard Problem" of methodically inferring which physical systems are conscious—but would not solve Chalmers' hard problem. He argues: "Even if IIT is correct, it does not explain why integrated information generates (or is) consciousness." Chalmers agrees that IIT, if correct, would solve the "Pretty Hard Problem" rather than the hard problem.

=== Global workspace theory ===
Global workspace theory (GWT) is a cognitive architecture and theory of consciousness proposed by the cognitive psychologist Bernard Baars in 1988. Baars explains the theory with the metaphor of a theatre, with conscious processes represented by an illuminated stage. This theatre integrates inputs from a variety of unconscious and otherwise autonomous networks in the brain and then broadcasts them to unconscious networks (represented in the metaphor by a broad, unlit "audience"). The theory has since been expanded upon by other scientists including cognitive neuroscientist Stanislas Dehaene.

In his original paper outlining the hard problem of consciousness, Chalmers discussed GWT as a theory that only targets one of the "easy problems" of consciousness. In particular, he said GWT provided a promising account of how information in the brain could become globally accessible, but argued that "now the question arises in a different form: why should global accessibility give rise to conscious experience? As always, this bridging question is unanswered." J. W. Dalton similarly criticised GWT on the grounds that it provides, at best, an account of the cognitive function of consciousness, and fails to explain its experiential aspect. By contrast, A. C. Elitzur argued: "While [GWT] does not address the 'hard problem', namely, the very nature of consciousness, it constrains any theory that attempts to do so and provides important insights into the relation between consciousness and cognition."

For his part, Baars writes (along with two colleagues) that there is no hard problem of explaining qualia over and above the problem of explaining causal functions, because qualia are entailed by neural activity and themselves causal. Dehaene, in his 2014 book Consciousness and the Brain, rejected the concept of qualia and argued that Chalmers' "easy problems" of consciousness are actually the hard problems. He further stated that the "hard problem" is based only upon ill-defined intuitions that are continually shifting as understanding evolves:

Once our intuitions are educated by cognitive neuroscience and computer simulations, Chalmers' hard problem will evaporate. The hypothetical concept of qualia, pure mental experience, detached from any information-processing role, will be viewed as a peculiar idea of the prescientific era, much like vitalism... [Just as science dispatched vitalism] the science of consciousness will keep eating away at the hard problem of consciousness until it vanishes.

=== Representationalism ===
Representationalism is the theory that our conscious perception of the world is mediated by mental representations rather than by direct encounter with reality. Representationalism has recently been defined within the framework of Neurorepresentationalism (see for an introduction Cyriel Pennartz) and as a unified theory of long-term memory that incorporates both explicit and implicit memory. Within neurorepresentationalism, it was argued that in particular theories of the formation of representations in explicit memory offered a way to reconcile philosophical concepts such as intentionality, emergence, and qualia with concepts from neuroscience. According to neurorepresentationalism, concepts from the philosophy of mind can be harmonized, in a non-reductionist way, with neurocognitive theories that define memory.

== Meta-problem ==
In 2018, Chalmers highlighted what he calls the "meta-problem of consciousness", another problem related to the hard problem of consciousness:

The meta-problem of consciousness is (to a first approximation) the problem of explaining why we think that there is a [hard] problem of consciousness.

In his "second approximation", he says it is the problem of explaining the behaviour of "phenomenal reports", and the behaviour of expressing a belief that there is a hard problem of consciousness. Explaining its significance, he says:

Although the meta-problem is strictly speaking an easy problem, it is deeply connected to the hard problem. We can reasonably hope that a solution to the meta-problem will shed significant light on the hard problem. A particularly strong line holds that a solution to the meta-problem will solve or dissolve the hard problem. A weaker line holds that it will not remove the hard problem, but it will constrain the form of a solution.

In other words, the "strong line" holds that the solution to the meta-problem would provide an explanation of our beliefs about consciousness that is independent of consciousness. That might debunk our beliefs about consciousness, in the same way that (Chalmers suggests) explaining beliefs about god in evolutionary terms may provide arguments against theism itself.

== In popular culture ==
Tom Stoppard's play The Hard Problem, first produced in 2015, is named after the hard problem of consciousness, which Stoppard defines as having "subjective First Person experiences".

== See also ==
- Animal consciousness
- Artificial consciousness
- Binding problem
- Blindsight
- Chinese room
- Cogito, ergo sum
- Cryonics
- Free will
- Ideasthesia
- Introspection
- Knowledge by acquaintance
- List of unsolved problems in biology
- Mind–body problem
- Phenomenalism
- Philosophy of self
- Primary–secondary quality distinction
- Problem of mental causation
- Problem of other minds
- Vertiginous question
- Consciousness causes collapse
