= Philosophical zombie =

Thought experiment in philosophy

In philosophy of mind, a philosophical zombie (or "p-zombie") is a being in a thought experiment that is physically identical to a normal human being but has no phenomenal experience. For example, if a philosophical zombie were poked with a sharp object, it would feel no pain, but would react just as a conscious human would. In other words, the being has full access consciousness but no phenomenal consciousness. The philosophical zombie is used in thought experiments about whether consciousness can be completely explained by facts about the brain and body.

Philosophical zombie arguments are used against forms of physicalism and in defense of the hard problem of consciousness, which is the problem of accounting in physical terms for subjective, intrinsic, first-person, what-it's-like-ness experiences. Proponents of philosophical zombie arguments, such as the philosopher David Chalmers, argue that since a philosophical zombie is by definition physically identical to a conscious person, even its logical possibility refutes physicalism. This is because it establishes the existence of conscious experience as a further fact. Philosopher Daniel Stoljar points out that zombies need not be utterly without subjective states, and that even a subtle psychological difference between two hypothetically physically identical people, such as how coffee tastes to them, is enough to refute physicalism. Such arguments have been criticized by many philosophers. Some physicalists, such as Daniel Dennett, argue that philosophical zombies are logically incoherent and thus impossible, or that all humans are philosophical zombies; others, such as Christopher Hill, argue that philosophical zombies are coherent but metaphysically impossible.

== History ==
Philosophical zombies are associated with David Chalmers, but it was philosopher Robert Kirk who first used the term "zombie" in this context, in 1974. Before that, Keith Campbell made a similar argument in his 1970 book Body and Mind, using the term "imitation man". Chalmers further developed and popularized the idea in his work.

There has been a lively debate over what the argument demonstrates. Critics who primarily argue that zombies are not conceivable include Daniel Dennett, Nigel J. T. Thomas, David Braddon-Mitchell, and Robert Kirk. Critics who assert mostly that conceivability does not entail possibility include Katalin Balog, Keith Frankish, Christopher Hill, and Stephen Yablo. Critics who question the argument's logical validity include George Bealer.

In his 2019 update to the article on philosophical zombies in the Stanford Encyclopedia of Philosophy, Kirk summed up the current state of the debate:

In spite of the fact that the arguments on both sides have become increasingly sophisticated—or perhaps because of it—they have not become more persuasive. The pull in each direction remains strong.

A 2013 survey of professional philosophers by Bourget and Chalmers found that 36% said p-zombies were conceivable but metaphysically impossible; 23% said they were metaphysically possible; 16% said they were inconceivable; and 25% responded "other". In 2020, the same survey yielded almost identical results: "conceivable but impossible" 37%, "metaphysically possible" 24%, "inconceivable" 16%, and "other" 23%.

== Types of zombies ==
Though philosophical zombies are widely used in thought experiments, the detailed articulation of the concept is not always the same. P-zombies were introduced primarily to argue against specific types of physicalism such as materialism and behaviorism, according to which mental states exist solely as behavior. Belief, desire, thought, consciousness, and so on, are conceptualized as behavior (whether external behavior or internal behavior) or tendencies towards behaviors. A p-zombie behaviorally indistinguishable from a normal human being but lacking conscious experiences is therefore not logically possible according to the behaviorist, so an appeal to the logical possibility of a p-zombie furnishes an argument that behaviorism is false. Proponents of zombie arguments generally accept that p-zombies are not physically possible, while opponents necessarily deny that they are metaphysically or, in some cases, even logically possible.

The unifying idea of the zombie is that of a human completely lacking conscious experience. It is possible to distinguish various zombie subtypes used in different thought experiments as follows:

- A behavioral zombie is behaviorally indistinguishable from a human.
- A neurological zombie has a human brain and is generally physiologically indistinguishable from a human.
- A soulless zombie lacks a soul.

Related concepts include:

- A zombie world, which is identical to our world in all physical ways, but no being in it has qualia.
- A philosophical vulcan, a being who is conscious but without valence; i.e., their consciousness is neither pleasant nor unpleasant.
- An inverse zombie, a being who behaves as if it lacks consciousness but is nonetheless conscious. Some comatose patients are inverse zombies.

== Zombie arguments ==
Zombie arguments often support lines of reasoning that aim to show that zombies are metaphysically possible in order to support some form of dualism—in this case the view that the world includes two kinds of substance (or perhaps two kinds of property): the mental and the physical.

In physicalism, material facts determine all other facts. Since any fact other than that of consciousness may be held to be the same for a p-zombie and for a normal conscious human, it follows that physicalism must hold that p-zombies are either not possible or are the same as normal humans.

The zombie argument is a version of general modal arguments against physicalism, such as that of Saul Kripke. Further such arguments were notably advanced in the 1970s by Thomas Nagel (1970; 1974) and Robert Kirk (1974), but the general argument was most famously developed in detail by David Chalmers in The Conscious Mind (1996).

According to Chalmers, one can coherently conceive of an entire zombie world, a world physically indistinguishable from this one but entirely lacking conscious experience. Chalmers writes: "Zombies are probably not naturally possible: they probably cannot exist in our world, with its laws of nature." The outline structure of Chalmers's version of the zombie argument is as follows:

1. According to physicalism, all that exists in our world (including consciousness) is physical.
2. Chalmers argues that we can conceive of a world physically indistinguishable from our world but in which there is no consciousness (a zombie world). From this it follows that such a world is metaphysically possible.
3. If a world is conceivable, then it is possible. If a physical world could exist without consciousness, then physical facts cannot entirely explain consciousness.
4. Therefore, physicalism is false. (The conclusion follows from 2. and 3. by modus tollens.)

The above is a strong formulation of the zombie argument. There are other formulations of zombie-type arguments that follow the same general form. The premises of the general zombie argument are implied by the premises of all the specific zombie arguments.

A general zombie argument is in part motivated by potential disagreements between various anti-physicalist views. For example, an anti-physicalist view can consistently assert that p-zombies are metaphysically impossible but that inverted qualia (such as inverted spectra) or absent qualia (partial zombiehood) are metaphysically possible. Premises regarding inverted qualia or partial zombiehood can replace premises regarding p-zombies to produce variations of the zombie argument.

The metaphysical possibility of a physically indistinguishable world with either inverted qualia or partial zombiehood implies that physical truths do not metaphysically necessitate phenomenal truths.

To construct the general form of the zombie argument, take the sentence P to be true if and only if the conjunct of all microphysical truths of our world obtain, and take the sentence Q to be true if some phenomenal truth that obtains in the actual world obtains. The general argument goes as follows.

1. It is conceivable that P is true and Q is not true.
2. If it is conceivable that P is true and Q is not true then it is metaphysically possible that P is true and Q not true.
3. If it is metaphysically possible that P is true and Q is not true then physicalism is false.
4. Therefore, physicalism is false.

Q can be false in a possible world if any of the following obtains: (1) there exists at least one invert relative to the actual world; (2) there is at least one absent quale relative to the actual world; (3) all actually conscious beings are p-zombies (all actual qualia are absent qualia).

Another way to construe the zombie hypothesis is epistemically—as a problem of causal explanation, rather than as a problem of logical or metaphysical possibility. The "explanatory gap"—also called the "hard problem of consciousness"—is the claim that (to date) no one has provided a convincing causal explanation of how and why we are conscious. It is a manifestation of the very same gap that (to date) no one has provided a convincing causal explanation of how and why we are not zombies.

The philosophical zombie argument can also be seen through the counterfeit bill example brought forth by Amy Kind. Kind's example centers around a counterfeit 20-dollar bill made to be exactly like an authentic 20-dollar bill. This is logically possible. Yet the counterfeit bill would not have the same value.

According to Kind, in her book Philosophy of Mind: The Basics, the zombie argument can be put in this standard form from a dualist point of view:

Zombies, creatures that are microphysically identical to conscious beings but that lack consciousness entirely, are conceivable. If zombies are conceivable then they are possible. Therefore, zombies are possible. If zombies are possible, then consciousness is non-physical. Therefore, consciousness is non-physical.

== Responses ==
Galen Strawson argues that it is impossible to establish the conceivability of zombies, so the argument, lacking its first premise, fails.

Chalmers has argued that zombies are conceivable, saying, "it certainly seems that a coherent situation is described; I can discern no contradiction in the description."

Many physicalist philosophers reject this argument. René Descartes argued that nonhuman animals are automata (mechanical robots) without conscious experience, whose behavior can be explained like that of any mechanism. According to physicalists, the world is wholly physical; therefore, physically identical beings must be equally conscious. Others have argued that our ability to imagine zombies does not entail their metaphysical possibility.

The zombie argument claims that one can tell by the power of reason that such a "zombie scenario" is metaphysically possible. Chalmers writes, "From the conceivability of zombies, proponents of the argument infer their metaphysical possibility" and argues that this inference, while not generally legitimate, is legitimate for phenomenal concepts such as consciousness since we must adhere to "Kripke's insight that for phenomenal concepts, there is no gap between reference-fixers and reference (or between primary and secondary intentions)."

That is, for phenomenal concepts, conceivability implies possibility. According to Chalmers, whatever is logically possible is also, in the sense relevant here, metaphysically possible.

Another response is the denial of the idea that qualia and related phenomenal notions of the mind are in the first place coherent concepts. Daniel Dennett and others argue that while consciousness and subjective experience exist in some sense, they are not as the zombie argument proponent claims. The experience of pain, for example, is not something that can be stripped off a person's mental life without bringing about any behavioral or physiological differences. Dennett believes that consciousness is a complex series of functions and ideas. If we all can have these experiences the idea of the p-zombie is meaningless.

Dennett argues that "when philosophers claim that zombies are conceivable, they invariably underestimate the task of conception (or imagination), and end up imagining something that violates their own definition". He coined the term "zimboes"—p-zombies that have second-order beliefs—to argue that the idea of a p-zombie is incoherent; "Zimboes think^{Z} they are conscious, think^{Z} they have qualia, think^{Z} they suffer pains—they are just 'wrong' (according to this lamentable tradition), in ways that neither they nor we could ever discover!"

Michael P. Lynch agrees with Dennett, arguing that the zombie conceivability argument forces us to either question whether we actually have consciousness or accept that zombies are not possible. If zombies falsely believe they are conscious, how can we be sure we are not zombies? We may believe we are experiencing conscious mental states when in fact we merely hold a false belief. Lynch thinks denying the possibility of zombies is more reasonable than questioning our own consciousness.

Furthermore, when the concept of self is deemed to correspond to physical reality alone (reductive physicalism), philosophical zombies are denied by definition. When a distinction is made in one's mind between a hypothetical zombie and oneself (assumed not to be a zombie), the hypothetical zombie, being a subset of the concept of oneself, must entail a deficit in observables (cognitive systems), a "seductive error" contradicting the original definition of a zombie.

Thomas Metzinger dismisses the zombie argument as no longer relevant to the consciousness community, calling it a weak argument that covertly relies on the difficulty of defining "consciousness" and an "ill-defined folk psychological umbrella term".

According to verificationism, for words to have meaning, their use must be open to public verification. Since it is assumed that we can talk about our qualia, the existence of zombies is impossible.

Artificial intelligence researcher Marvin Minsky saw the argument as circular. The proposition of the possibility of something physically identical to a human but without subjective experience assumes that the physical characteristics of humans are not what produces those experiences, which is exactly what the argument claims to prove.

Richard Brown agrees that the zombie argument is circular. To show this, he proposes two hypothetical beings: zoombies and shombies. Zoombies are creatures that are nonphysically identical to people in every way and lacking phenomenal consciousness. If zoombies existed, they would refute dualism because they would show that phenomenal consciousness escapes the net of a complete dualistic science (involving, say, a nonphysical substance called ectoplasm). Shombies are creatures that are physically identical to people in every way and have the same phenomenal consciousness as them. If shombies existed, they would refute dualism because they would show that phenomenal consciousness can be explained by a complete physicalist science. Paralleling the argument from Chalmers: It is conceivable that zoombies/shombies exist, so it is possible they exist, so dualism is false. Given the symmetry between the zombie and zoombie/shombie arguments, we cannot arbitrate the physicalism/dualism question a priori.

Similarly, Gualtiero Piccinini argues that the zombie conceivability argument is circular. Piccinini questions whether the possible worlds where zombies exist are accessible from our world. If physicalism is true in our world, then physicalism is one of the relevant facts about our world for determining whether a possible zombie world is accessible from our world. Therefore, asking whether zombies are metaphysically possible in our world is equivalent to asking whether physicalism is true in our world.

Stephen Yablo's (1998) response is to provide an error theory to account for the intuition that zombies are possible. Notions of what counts as physical and as physically possible change over time so conceptual analysis is not reliable here. Yablo says he is "braced for the information that is going to make zombies inconceivable, even though I have no real idea what form the information is going to take."

The zombie argument is difficult to assess because it brings to light fundamental disagreements about the method and scope of philosophy itself and the nature and abilities of conceptual analysis. Proponents of the zombie argument may think that conceptual analysis is a central part of (if not the only part of) philosophy and that it certainly can do a great deal of philosophical work. But others, such as Dennett, Paul Churchland and W. V. O. Quine, have fundamentally different views. For this reason, discussion of the zombie argument remains vigorous in philosophy.

Some accept modal reasoning in general but deny it in the zombie case. Christopher S. Hill and Brian P. McLaughlin suggest that the zombie thought experiment combines imagination of a "sympathetic" nature (putting oneself in a phenomenal state) and a "perceptual" nature (imagining becoming aware of something in the outside world). Each type of imagination may work on its own but not work when used at the same time. Hence Chalmers's argument need not go through.

Moreover, while Chalmers defuses criticisms of the view that conceivability can tell us about possibility, he provides no positive defense of the principle. As an analogy, the generalized continuum hypothesis has no known counterexamples, but this does not mean we must accept it. Indeed, according to Hill and McLaughlin, the fact that Chalmers concludes we have epiphenomenal mental states that do not cause our physical behavior seems to be a reason to reject his principle.

== Related thought experiments ==
Frank Jackson's knowledge argument is based around a hypothetical scientist, Mary, who is forced to view the world through a black-and-white television screen in a black and white room. Mary is a brilliant scientist who knows everything about the neurobiology of vision. Even though she knows everything about color and its perception (e.g. what combination of wavelengths makes the sky seem blue), she has never seen color. If Mary were released from this room and experienced color for the first time, would she learn anything new? Jackson initially believed this supported epiphenomenalism (mental phenomena are the effects, but not the causes, of physical phenomena) but later changed his view to physicalism, suggesting that Mary is simply discovering a new way for her brain to represent qualities that exist in the world.

Swampman is an imaginary character introduced by Donald Davidson. If Davidson goes hiking in a swamp and is struck and killed by a lightning bolt while nearby another lightning bolt spontaneously rearranges a bunch of molecules so that, entirely by coincidence, they take on exactly the same form that Davidson's body had at the moment of his untimely death, then this being, "Swampman", has a brain structurally identical to Davidson's and will thus presumably behave exactly like Davidson. He will return to Davidson's office and write the same essays he would have written, recognize all of his friends and family, and so forth.

John Searle's Chinese room argument deals with the nature of artificial intelligence: it imagines a room in which a conversation is held by means of written Chinese characters that the subject cannot actually read, but is able to manipulate meaningfully using a set of algorithms. Searle holds that a program cannot give a computer a "mind" or "understanding", regardless of how intelligently it may make it behave. Stevan Harnad argues that Searle's critique is really meant to target functionalism and computationalism, and to establish neuroscience as the only correct way to understand the mind.

Physicist Adam Brown has suggested constructing a type of philosophical zombie using counterfactual quantum computation, a technique in which a computer is placed into a superposition of running and not running. If the program being executed is a brain simulation, and if one makes the further assumption that brain simulations are conscious, then the simulation can have the same output as a conscious system, yet not be conscious.

== See also ==
- Artificial intelligence – Intelligence in machines
- Begging the question – Logic founded on unproven premises
- Blindsight – Visual response in some blind people
- Blindsight – 2006 novel by Peter Watts — a novel involving intelligent entities without consciousness
- Causality – How one process influences another
- Double-aspect theory – Theory in the philosophy of mind
- Ethics of uncertain sentience – Area of applied ethics
- Map–territory relation – Relationship between an object and a representation of that object
- Mind–body problem – Open question in philosophy of how abstract minds interact with physical bodies
- Neutral monism – Philosophical view that mind and matter come from one neutral underlying reality
- NPC (meme) – Insult implying a lack of critical thinking
- No true Scotsman – Logical fallacy
- Problem of other minds – Epistemological problem
- Quantum Night – 2016 Robert J. Sawyer novel
- Reverse engineering – Process of extracting design information from anything artificial
- Sentience – Ability to experience feelings and sensations
- Ship of Theseus – Thought experiment about identity over time
- Solipsism – Philosophical idea that only one's own mind is certain to exist
- Swampman – Philosophical thought experiment concerning personal identity
- Turing test – Test of a machine's ability to imitate human intelligence
- Vertiginous question – Philosophical question about personal identity
