= The Conscious Mind =

1996 philosophy book by David Chalmers

The Conscious Mind: In Search of a Fundamental Theory
- Cover
- Author: David Chalmers
- Language: English
- Subject: Philosophy of mind
- Publisher: Oxford University Press
- Publication date: 1996
- Publication place: United States
- Media type: Print (hardcover and paperback)
- Pages: 432
- ISBN: 978-0195117899

The Conscious Mind: In Search of a Fundamental Theory was published in 1996, and is the first book written by David Chalmers, an Australian philosopher specialising in philosophy of mind. Although the book has been greatly influential, Chalmers maintains that it is "far from perfect", as most of it was written as part of his PhD dissertation after "studying philosophy for only four years".

== Summary ==
=== Thesis ===
In The Conscious Mind, Chalmers argues that (1) the physical does not exhaust the actual, so materialism is false; (2) consciousness is a fundamental fact of nature; (3) science and philosophy should strive towards discovering a fundamental law of consciousness.

=== Definitions ===
- Psychological consciousness: publicly accessible descriptions of consciousness, such as its neurochemical correlates or role in influencing behaviour.
- Phenomenal consciousness: experience; something is phenomenologically conscious if it feels like something to be it. (Note: Chalmers pulls Thomas Nagel's famous essay What is it Like to be a Bat?. By Nagel's account, a bat is conscious if it feels like something to be a bat.)

Every mental state can be described in psychological terms, phenomenological terms, or both.

=== Further clarification ===
Psychological and phenomenal consciousness are often conflated. Thinkers may purport to have solved consciousness (in the phenomenological sense) when really all they have solved are certain aspects of psychological consciousness. To use Chalmers words: they claim to have solved the "hard problem of consciousness", when really all they have solved are certain "easy problems of consciousness". (Note: The use of the word easy is tongue in check. These problems are only easy in the sense that, in principle, they can be solved with the current frameworks of science.)

Chalmers believes that an adequate theory of consciousness can only come by solving both the hard and easy problems. On top of discovering brain states associated with conscious experience, science must also discover why and how certain brain states are accompanied by experience. This is what Chalmers attempts to do in The Conscious Mind.

=== Arguments against reductionism ===
The hard problem is hard, by Chalmers' account, because conscious experience is irreducible to lower-order physical facts. (Note: This is a strange break from routine. Though chaos theory complicates things, nearly everything that exists can be reduced to a lower order level of analysis (in principle at least); psychology can be reduced to biology which can be reduced to chemistry which can be reduced to physics.) He supports this conclusion with three main lines of argument, which are summarised below.

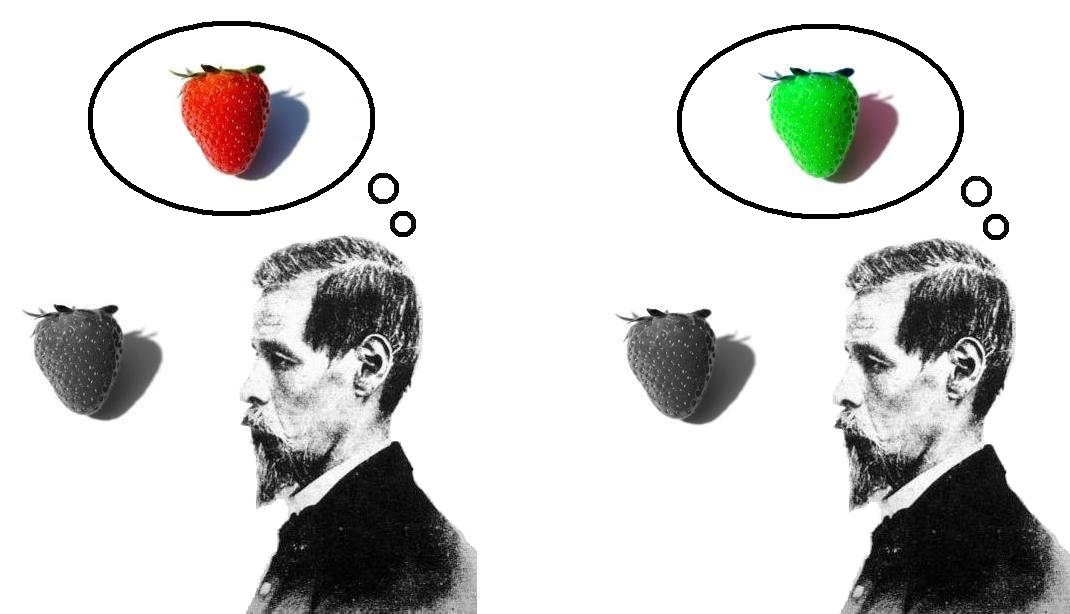
Inverted qualia

1. Appeals to conceivability: Chalmers argues that conscious experience can always be "abstracted away" from reductive explanations. This is evidenced by the conceivability and, by extension, logical possibility of philosophical zombies (exact replicas of a person that lack conscious experience). (Note: Chalmers argues that conceivability can inform logical possibility. For instance, it is inconceivable that all the properties of H_{2}O could be the same without the properties of water being the same; facts about H_{2}O explain everything there is to explain. Similarly, it is inconceivable that one could perfectly replicate all the facts about a wombats cellular biology without replicating facts about the wombat in question. Because these things are inconceivable, they are thereby logically impossible. Conversely, philosophical zombies "are" conceivable and are they are thereby logically possible. This argument has proven to be controversial, however. (See: Criticism)) Alternatively, it is conceivable that a "partial zombie" could have been "physically identical", but not "phenomenological identical" to their nonzombie twin (they could have an inverted visible spectrum, for instance).
2. Appeals to epistemology: Unlike other forms of knowledge, knowledge of consciousness can only ever be gained through first-hand experience. The problem of other minds is evidence of this. Frank Jackson's famous thought experiment Mary's Room demonstrates a similar point. Upon seeing red, Mary gains new information was not entailed by the physical facts alone. (Note: To put things more formally: (1) upon seeing the colour red, Mary is gaining new knowledge of the world (as is evidenced by the fact that the experience can be expressed as a conditional); (2) the fact that Mary can only gain this knowledge by acquaintance (a point nearly every critic concedes) demonstrates that the experiential fact of what it is like to see red does not logically supervene on physical facts; so (3) facts about consciousness are further facts about the world over and above the physical facts.)
3. Appeals to analysis: There are no satisfying reductive accounts of consciousness, and it is not even clear what such a theory would look like. All such accounts suffer from the same core sin: the inability to explain why certain brain states are accompanied by conscious experience.

The conclusion of all these arguments is the same: consciousness is irreducible to physical facts alone.

=== Against materialism ===
The only things that are irreducible to lower-level facts are fundamental laws of nature (e.g., space and time). Since consciousness is irreducible, Chalmers believes that it, too, is fundamental. (Note: Chalmers rejects materialism but embraces naturalism. In other words, while he doesn't believe that reality is governed exclusively by the laws of physics, he believes that reality is governed in full by fundamental laws of nature.)

Chalmers accepts that people may be reluctant to accept this conclusion, but notes that people were initially reluctant to accept the fundamental nature of electromagnetism as well. He also accepts that his conclusion sounds jarring, but notes that the brute nature of consciousness poses no more of a mystery than the brute nature of electromagnetism, gravity, or any other fundamental law.

=== Constraints ===
So, just as scientists of the past have sought fundamental laws of gravity and electromagnetism, so too should scientists of the present seek fundamental laws of consciousness. So, after providing the disclaimer that he is "most likely to be entirely wrong", Chalmers puts forward possible ways in which the search for a theory may be constrained:

- Phenomenal judgements: A theory of consciousness should be able to dispel epiphenominalism (Note: Chalmers uses two-two-dimensional semantics^{[see: Further reading]} to explain his reasoning on this point. In short, his argument is (1) a philosophical zombie would only be able to understand secondary intentions; (2) there are logically possible scenarios where two nonzombies have the same primary intentions (such as the phenomenological realisation of red) that correspond to different secondary intentions (such as different wavelengths of light); (3) In such scenarios the zombies' communication would face challenges not faced by the two nonzombies; so (4) even if consciousness lacks causal influence it still "inserts" itself into phenomenal judgements; (5) an adequate theory of consciousness must be able to reconcile this fact.) without resorting to interactionism (a view which Chalmers rejects).
- The double-aspect principle: Some information must be realised both physically and phenomenologically (i.e., realised both in the mind and brain). (Note: It may be a good idea to constrain the Double-Aspect Principle even further so only certain information is phenomenally realised. If all information is phenomenally realised then certain counterintuitive conclusions (such as thermostats being minimally conscious) must be accepted. Though, as Chalmers notes, this is not necessarily something to avoid; reality is under no obligation to align with modern intuitions. (Chalmers is open to the possibility of consciousness being ubiquitous and expresses sympathy for neutral monism (though he notes that it is not without its flaws)). In any case, the issue is worth drawing attention to.)
- Structural coherence: the internal structure of consciousness (structural relations between qualia, such as the red/green blue/yellow axis of colour vision) must be accounted for.
- The principle of organisational invariance: Through the thought experiments of Fading Qualia and Dancing Qualia.^{[see: Further reading]} (Note: Consciousness must be realised through the structure of the brain, not the substance of the brain. If this were not true, then gradually replacing one's neurons with silicon chips would cause consciousness to disappear or change in structure. But since the structure remains the same, this would happen without any corresponding changes in behaviour. This seems implausible, so Chalmers concludes that consciousness is realised through structure rather than substance.) Chalmers concludes that consciousness and its contents are substrate independent; structurally isomorphic computations must create qualitatively identical experiences regardless of how they are realised.

Similarly, Chalmers puts forward a number of "open questions" that a fundamental theory must answer:

- Why does certain information correspond to certain qualia rather than functionally equivalent qualia?
- What are the relations between spatial representations in the mind and the structure of space itself?
- How do the structures of our sensory and neurological apparatus influence the structure of consciousness?
- What causes the unification of consciousness?
- Why are some bits of information realised in experience while others are not?

Good contenders for a fundamental theory of consciousness would be one that (a) fits the above criteria; (b) is compatible with the data; (c) has predicative power; and (c) is elegant. Though, of course, there will likely be further considerations that arise as science progresses.

=== Speculation ===
Chalmers explores a number of possibilities. Chalmers believes that information (Note: Chalmers uses Claude Shannon's definition of a bit: a difference that makes a difference.) will invariably play a central role in any theory of consciousness. However, Chalmers is unsure whether or not information will ultimately play a conceptual role or an ontological one. Chalmers further constrains the role of information by concluding that it must only be phenomenally realised if it is physically realised; in other words, the information system must be active (otherwise, a computer that is turned off may have qualia). So causation may also play a role.

Interestingly, this account of consciousness has predictive power within the realm of quantum theory. Namely, it addresses objections made by the physicist Roger Penrose regarding the many worlds interpretation of quantum mechanics:

I do not see why a conscious being need be aware of only "one" of the alternatives in a linear superposition. What is it about consciousnesses that says that consciousness must not be "aware" of that tantalising linear combination of both a dead and a live cat? It seems to me that a theory of consciousness would be needed for one to square the many world view with what one actually observes.

Chalmers' earlier account of consciousness is such a theory. This leaves the many-world view undoubtedly the most elegant of all interpretations of quantum mechanics (from a mathematical standpoint), albeit a counterintuitive one.

== Reception ==
The Conscious Mind has had a significant influence on philosophy of mind and the scientific study of consciousness, as is evidenced by Chalmers easy/hard problem distinction having become standard terminology within relevant philosophical and scientific fields. Chalmers has expressed bewilderment at the book's success, writing that it has "received far more attention than I reasonably could have expected."

=== Praise ===
David Lewis is a proponent of materialism whose views are criticised numerous times throughout The Conscious Mind. Despite this, Lewis praises Chalmers for his understanding of the issue and for leaving his critics with "few points to make" that Chalmers "hasn't made already". Lewis has characterised The Conscious Mind as "exceptionally ambitious and exceptionally successful", considering it "the best book in philosophy of mind for many years."

Steven Pinker has hailed The Conscious Mind as an "outstanding contribution" to consciousness studies, stating that Chalmers argued his thesis "with impeccable clarity and rigor".

=== Criticism ===
Patricia and Paul Churchland have criticised Chalmers' claim that everything but consciousness logically supervenes on the physical, and that such failures of supervenience mean that materialism must be false. Heat and luminescence, for instance, are both physical properties that logically supervene on the physical. Others have questioned the premise that a priori entailment is required for logical supervenience.

Daniel Dennett has labelled Chalmers a "reactionary", and calls the invocation of philosophical zombies "an embarrassment". By his account, the thought experiment hinges on a "hunch" and begs the question. He argues that the mysterious nature of consciousness amounts to nothing more than a cognitive illusion, and that philosophers ought to drop "the zombie like a hot potato".

Chalmers responds to critics in his 2010 book The Character of Consciousness and on his website.

=== Book reviews ===
The Conscious Mind has been reviewed in journals such as Foundations of Physics, Psychological Medicine, Mind, The Journal of Mind and Behavior, and Australian Review of Books. The book was described by The Sunday Times as "one of the best science books of the year."

== See also ==
- Philosophy of Mind
- The Mind-Body Problem
- Explanatory gap
- Problem of other minds
- Brain in a vat
- What is it Like to be a Bat?
- Qualia
- Supervenience
- Philosophical Zombie
- Neutral monism
- Chinese Room
- Meditations on First Philosophy
- Consciousness Explained
