= David Chalmers =

Australian philosopher and cognitive scientist (born 1966)

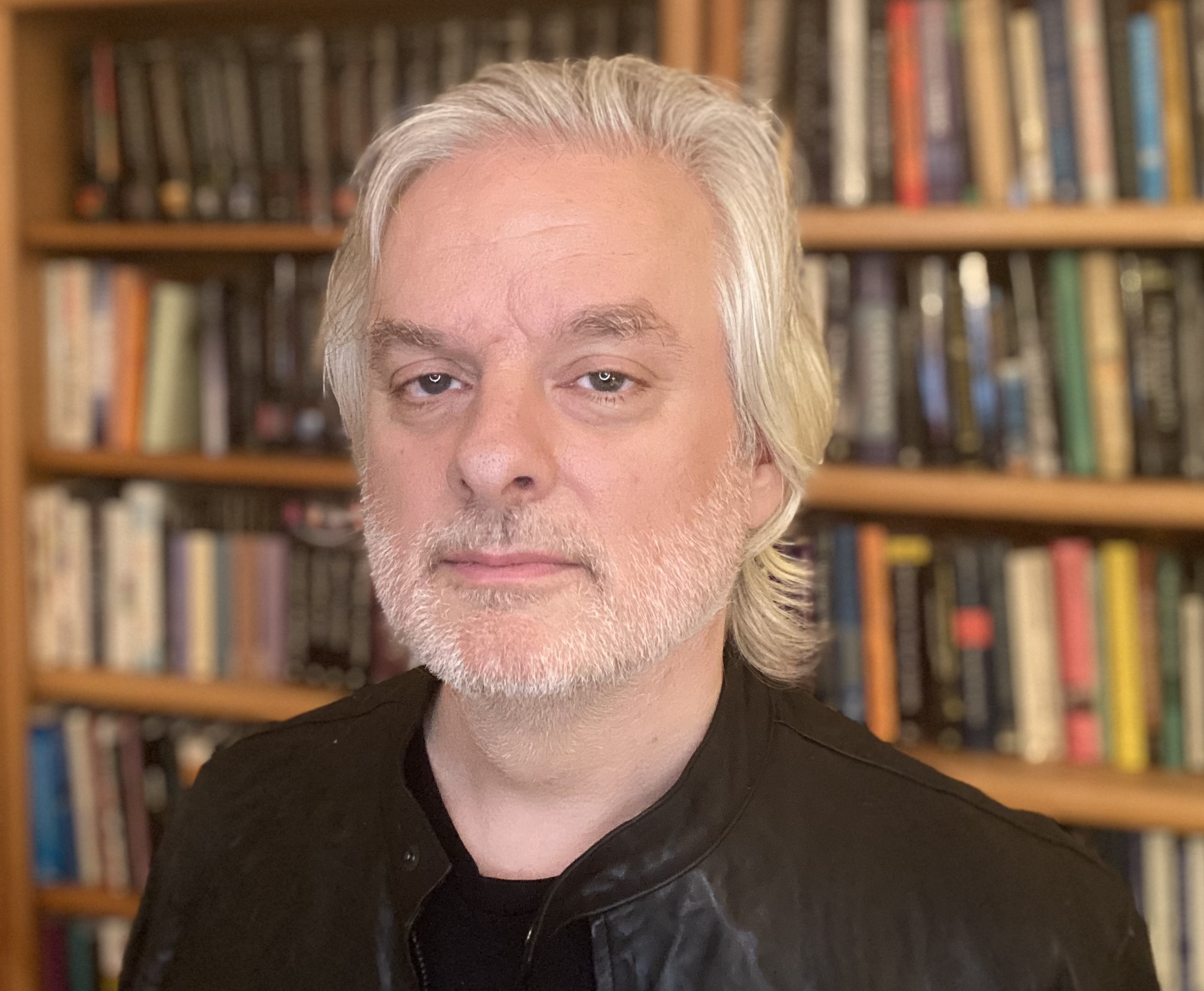
- Chalmers in 2021
- Born: David John Chalmers; 20 April 1966 (age 60); Sydney, New South Wales, Australia

Education
- Education: University of Adelaide (BSc, 1986); University of Oxford (1987–1988); Indiana University Bloomington (PhD, 1993)
- Thesis: Toward a Theory of Consciousness (1993)
- Doctoral advisor: Douglas Hofstadter

Philosophical work
- Era: Contemporary philosophy
- Region: Western philosophy
- School: Analytic
- Institutions: Washington University in St. Louis; University of California, Santa Cruz; University of Arizona; Australian National University; New York University
- Main interests: Philosophy of mind Consciousness; Philosophy of language
- Notable ideas: Hard problem of consciousness, extended mind, two-dimensional semantics, naturalistic dualism, philosophical zombie, further facts

David John Chalmers (/ˈtʃɑːmərz/ CHAH-mərz; born 20 April 1966) is an Australian philosopher and cognitive scientist, specializing in philosophy of mind and philosophy of language. He is a professor of philosophy and neural science at New York University (NYU), as well as co-director of NYU's Center for Mind, Brain and Consciousness (along with Ned Block). In 2006, he was elected a fellow of the Australian Academy of the Humanities. In 2013, he was elected as a fellow of the American Academy of Arts and Sciences.

Chalmers is best known for formulating the hard problem of consciousness, and for popularizing the philosophical zombie thought experiment.

Chalmers and David Bourget co-founded PhilPapers; a database of journal articles for philosophers.

== Early life and education ==
David Chalmers was born in Sydney, New South Wales, and subsequently grew up in Adelaide, South Australia, where he attended Unley High School.

As a child, he experienced synesthesia. He began coding and playing computer games at the age of 10 on a PDP-10 at a medical center. He also performed exceptionally in mathematics, and secured a bronze medal in the International Mathematical Olympiad. When Chalmers was 13, he read Douglas Hofstadter's 1979 book Gödel, Escher, Bach, which awakened an interest in philosophy.

Chalmers received his undergraduate degree in pure mathematics from the University of Adelaide. After graduating, Chalmers spent six months reading philosophy books while hitchhiking across Europe, before continuing his studies at the University of Oxford, where he was a Rhodes Scholar but eventually withdrew from the course.

In 1993, Chalmers received his PhD in philosophy and cognitive science from Indiana University Bloomington under Douglas Hofstadter, writing a doctoral thesis entitled Toward a Theory of Consciousness. He was a postdoctoral fellow in the Philosophy-Neuroscience-Psychology program directed by Andy Clark at Washington University in St. Louis from 1993 to 1995.

== Career ==
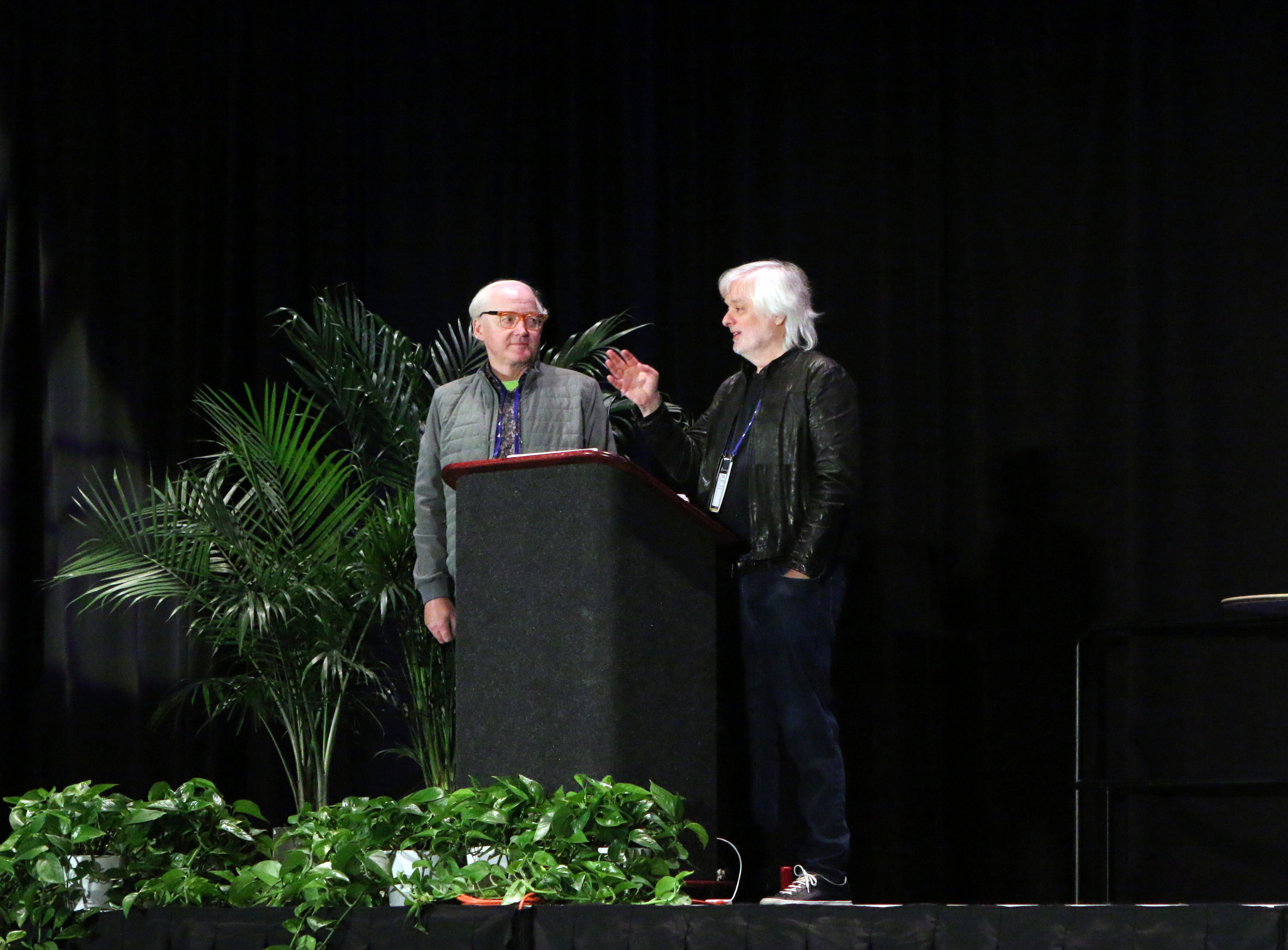
David Chalmers with Toby Walsh at AAAI Conference 2025, Philadelphia

In 1994, Chalmers presented a lecture at the inaugural Toward a Science of Consciousness conference. According to the Chronicle of Higher Education, this "lecture established Chalmers as a thinker to be reckoned with and goosed a nascent field into greater prominence." He went on to co-organize the conference (renamed "The Science of Consciousness") for some years with Stuart Hameroff, but stepped away when he felt it became too divergent from mainstream science. Chalmers is a founding member of the Association for the Scientific Study of Consciousness and one of its past presidents.

Having established his reputation, Chalmers received his first professorship at UC Santa Cruz, from August 1995 to December 1998. In 1996 he published the widely cited book The Conscious Mind. Chalmers was subsequently appointed Professor of Philosophy (1999–2004) and then Director of the Center for Consciousness Studies (2002–2004) at the University of Arizona. In 2004, Chalmers returned to Australia, encouraged by an ARC Federation Fellowship, becoming professor of philosophy and director of the Center for Consciousness at the Australian National University. Chalmers accepted a part-time professorship at the philosophy department of New York University in 2009, becoming a full-time professor in 2014.

In 2013, Chalmers was elected a Fellow of the American Academy of Arts & Sciences. He is an editor on topics in the philosophy of mind for the Stanford Encyclopedia of Philosophy. In May 2018, it was announced that he would serve on the jury for the Berggruen Prize.

In 2023, Chalmers won a bet—made in 1998, for a case of wine—with neuroscientist Christof Koch that the neural underpinnings for consciousness would not be resolved by the year 2023, while Koch had bet that they would.

== Philosophical work ==
=== Philosophy of mind ===
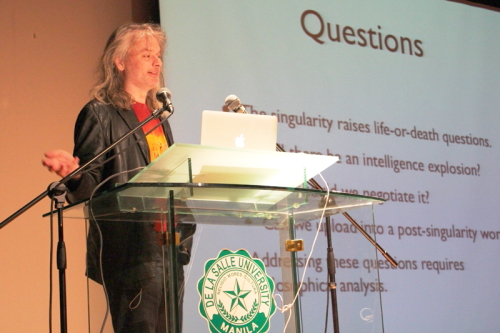
Chalmers on stage for an Alan Turing Year event at De La Salle University, Manila, 27 March 2012

Chalmers is best known for formulating what he calls the "hard problem of consciousness", in both his 1995 paper "Facing Up to the Problem of Consciousness" and his 1996 book The Conscious Mind. He makes a distinction between "easy" problems of consciousness, such as explaining object discrimination or verbal reports, and the single hard problem, which could be stated "why does the feeling which accompanies awareness of sensory information exist at all?" The essential difference between the (cognitive) easy problems and the (phenomenal) hard problem is that the former are at least theoretically answerable via the dominant strategy in the philosophy of mind: physicalism. Chalmers argues for an "explanatory gap" from the objective to the subjective, and criticizes physicalist explanations of mental experience, making him a dualist. Chalmers characterizes his view as "naturalistic dualism": naturalistic because he believes mental states supervene "naturally" on physical systems (such as brains); dualist because he believes mental states are ontologically distinct from and not reducible to physical systems. He has also characterized his view by more traditional formulations such as property dualism.

In support of property dualism and the extra need for non physical explanations alongside the physical ones for a complete explanation of the world, Chalmers is famous for his commitment to the logical (though, not natural) possibility of philosophical zombies. These zombies are complete physical duplicates of human beings, lacking only qualitative experience. Chalmers argues that since such zombies are conceivable to us, they must therefore be logically possible. Since they are logically possible, then qualia and sentience are not fully explained by physical properties alone; the facts about them are further facts. Instead, Chalmers argues that consciousness is a fundamental property ontologically autonomous of any known (or even possible) physical properties, and that there may be lawlike rules which he terms "psychophysical laws" that determine which physical systems are associated with which types of qualia. He further speculates that all information-bearing systems may be conscious, leading him to entertain the possibility of conscious thermostats and a qualified panpsychism he calls panprotopsychism. Chalmers maintains a formal agnosticism on the issue, even conceding that the viability of panpsychism places him at odds with the majority of his contemporaries. According to Chalmers, his arguments are similar to a line of thought that goes back to Leibniz's 1714 "mill" argument; the first substantial use of philosophical "zombie" terminology may be Robert Kirk's 1974 "Zombies vs. Materialists".

After the publication of Chalmers's landmark paper, more than twenty papers in response were published in the Journal of Consciousness Studies. These papers (by Daniel Dennett, Colin McGinn, Francisco Varela, Francis Crick, and Roger Penrose, among others) were collected and published in the book Explaining Consciousness: The Hard Problem. John Searle critiqued Chalmers's views in The New York Review of Books.

In the book, Chalmers rejects the claim that property dualism is a restatement of epiphenomenalism. Chalmers had previously collaborated on linguistics with Frank Jackson, known for endorsing epiphenomenalism regarding consciousness. Although Jaegwon Kim explicitly labeled qualia as epiphenomenal and Daniel Dennett accused Chalmers's property dualism of the same, Chalmers rejected this characterization stating that even ideas can be re-ingested into physical systems and affect them, and that there was no causal closure in the physical world.

With Andy Clark, Chalmers has written "The Extended Mind", an article about the borders of the mind.

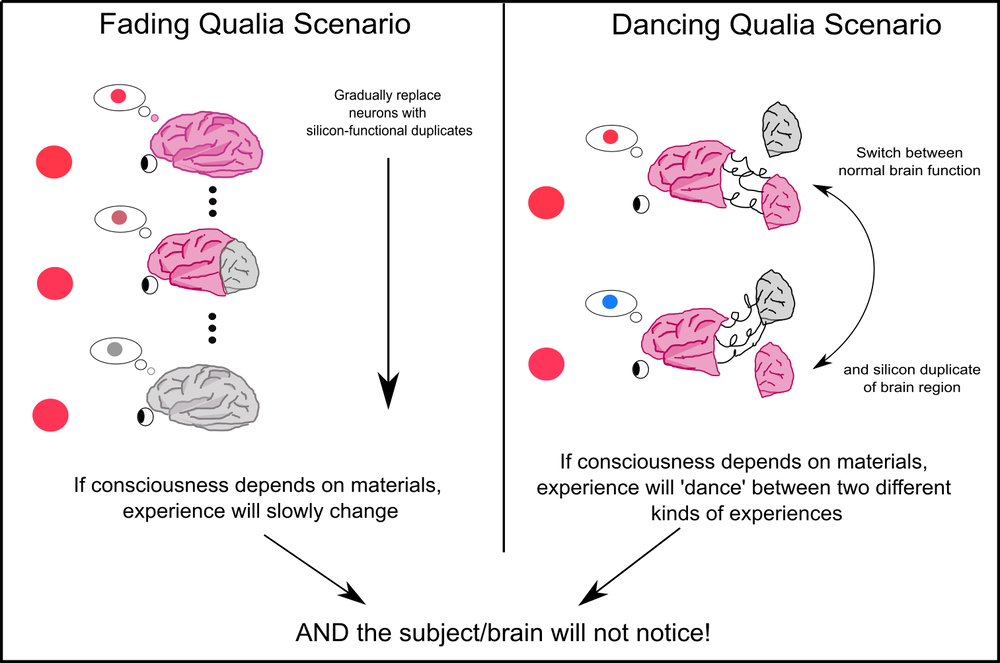
The "fading qualia" (left) and the "dancing qualia" (right) are two thought experiments about consciousness and brain replacement. Chalmers argues that both are contradicted by the lack of reaction of the subject to changing perception, thus demonstrating that perception is not explained by some physical fact external to the "hardware" of the brain. He concludes that the equivalent silicon brain will have the same perceptions as the biological brain.

According to Chalmers, systems that have the same functional organization "at a fine enough grain" (that are "functionally isomorphic") will have "qualitatively identical conscious experiences". In 1995, he proposed the reductio ad absurdum "fading qualia" thought experiment. It involves progressively replacing each neuron of a brain with a functional equivalent, for example implemented on a silicon chip. Since each substitute neuron performs the same function as the original, the subject would not notice any change. But, Chalmers argues, if qualia (for example, the perceived color of objects) were to fade or disappear, the brain's holder could notice the difference, which would alter the information processing in the brain, leading to a contradiction. He concludes that such fading qualia are impossible in practice, and that after each neuron is replaced, the resulting functionally isomorphic robotic brain would be as conscious as the original biological one. In addition, Chalmers proposed a similar thought experiment, "dancing qualia", which concludes that a robotic brain that is functionally isomorphic to a biological one would not only be as conscious, but would also have the same conscious experiences (e.g., the same perception of color when seeing an object). In 2023, he analyzed whether large language models could be conscious, and suggested that they were probably not conscious, but could become serious candidates for consciousness within a decade.

=== Philosophy of language ===
Chalmers has published works on the "theory of reference" concerning how words secure their referents. He, together with others such as Frank Jackson, played a major role in developing two-dimensional semantics.

==== Background ====
Before Saul Kripke delivered his famous lecture series Naming and Necessity in 1970, the descriptivism advocated by Gottlob Frege and Bertrand Russell was the orthodoxy. Descriptivism suggests that a name is an abbreviation of a description, which is a set of properties. This name secures its reference by a process of properties fitting: whichever object fits the description most, is the referent of the name. Therefore, the description provides the sense of the name, and it is through this sense that the reference of the name is determined.

However, as Kripke argued in Naming and Necessity, a name does not secure its reference via any process of description fitting. Rather, a name determines its reference via a historical-causal link tracing back to the process of naming. And thus, Kripke thinks that a name does not have a sense, or, at least, does not have a sense which is rich enough to play the reference-determining role. Moreover, a name, in Kripke's view, is a rigid designator, which refers to the same object in all possible worlds. Following this line of thought, Kripke suggests that any scientific identity statement such as "Water is H_{2}O" is also a necessary statement, i.e. true in all possible worlds. Kripke thinks that this is a phenomenon that descriptivism cannot explain.

And, as also proposed by Hilary Putnam and Kripke himself, Kripke's view on names can also be applied to the reference of natural kind terms. The kind of theory of reference that is advocated by Kripke and Putnam is called the direct reference theory.

==== Two-dimensional semantics ====
Chalmers disagrees with Kripke, and direct reference theorists in general. He thinks that there are two kinds of intension of a natural kind term, a stance called two-dimensionalism. For example, the statement "Water is H_{2}O" expresses two distinct propositions, often referred to as a primary intension and a secondary intension, which together form its meaning.

The primary intension of a word or sentence is its sense, i.e., the idea or method by which we find its referent. The primary intension of "water" might be a description, such as "the substance with water-like properties". The entity identified by this intension could vary in different hypothetical worlds. In the twin Earth thought experiment, for example, inhabitants might use "water" to mean their equivalent of water, even if its chemical composition is not H_{2}O. Thus, for that world, "water" does not refer to H_{2}O.

The secondary intension of "water" is whatever "water" refers to in this world. When considered according to its secondary intension, water refers to H_{2}O in every world. Through this concept, Chalmers provides a way to explain how reference is determined by distinguishing between epistemic possibilities (primary intension) and metaphysical necessities (secondary intension), ensuring that the referent (H_{2}O) is uniquely identified across all metaphysically possible worlds.

==== Philosophy of verbal disputes ====
In some more recent work, Chalmers has concentrated on verbal disputes. He argues that a dispute is best characterized as "verbal" when it concerns some sentence S which contains a term T such that (i) the parties to the dispute disagree over the meaning of T, and (ii) the dispute arises solely because of this disagreement. In the same work, Chalmers proposes certain procedures for the resolution of verbal disputes. One of these he calls the "elimination method", which involves eliminating the contentious term and observing whether any dispute remains.

=== Technology and virtual reality ===
Chalmers addressed the issue of virtual and non-virtual worlds in his 2022 book Reality+. While Chalmers recognises that virtual reality is not the same as non-virtual reality, he does not consider virtual reality to be an illusion, but rather a "genuine reality" in its own right. Chalmers sees virtual reality as potentially offering as meaningful a life as non-virtual reality, and argues that we could already be inhabitants of a simulation without knowing it.

Chalmers proposes that computers are forming a form of "exo-cortex", where a part of human cognition is 'outsourced' to corporations such as Apple and Google.

Chalmers was featured in the 2012 documentary film entitled The Singularity by filmmaker Doug Wolens, which focuses on the theory proposed by techno-futurist Ray Kurzweil, of that "point in time when computer intelligence exceeds human intelligence". He was a featured philosopher in the 2020 Daily Nous series on GPT-3, which he described as "one of the most interesting and important AI systems ever produced".

=== Philosophical progress ===
Chalmers has contributed to the analytic debate around philosophical progress and argues for a "glass-half-empty view". He maintains that philosophy has progressed, but not as much as philosophers would like it to. He can thus be categorized as a "moderate pessimist" concerning philosophical progress.

== Personal life ==
Regarding religion, Chalmers said in 2011: "I have no religious views myself and no spiritual views, except watered-down humanistic spiritual views. And consciousness is just a fact of life. It's a natural fact of life".

As of 2012 Chalmers was the lead singer of the Zombie Blues band, which performed at the music festival Qualia Fest in 2012 in New York.

== Bibliography ==
- The Conscious Mind: In Search of a Fundamental Theory (1996). Oxford University Press. hardcover: ISBN 0-19-511789-1, paperback: ISBN 0-19-510553-2
- Toward a Science of Consciousness III: The Third Tucson Discussions and Debates (1999). Stuart R. Hameroff, Alfred W. Kaszniak and David J. Chalmers (Editors). The MIT Press. ISBN 0-262-58181-7
- Philosophy of Mind: Classical and Contemporary Readings (2002). (Editor). Oxford University Press. ISBN 0-19-514581-X or ISBN 0-19-514580-1
- The Character of Consciousness (2010). Oxford University Press. hardcover: ISBN 0-19-531110-8, paperback: ISBN 0-19-531111-6
- Constructing the World (2012). Oxford University Press. hardcover: ISBN 978-0-19-960857-7, paperback: ISBN 978-0199608584
- Reality+: Virtual Worlds and the Problems of Philosophy (2022). W. W. Norton & Company. Hardcover: ISBN 978-0-393-63580-5
