= Explanatory gap =

Inability to describe conscious experiences in solely physical or structural terms

In the philosophy of mind, the explanatory gap is the difficulty that physicalist philosophies have in explaining how physical properties give rise to the way things feel subjectively when they are experienced. It is a term introduced by philosopher Joseph Levine. In the 1983 paper in which he first used the term, he used as an example the sentence, "Pain is the firing of C fibers", pointing out that while it might be valid in a physiological sense, it does not help us to understand how pain feels.

The explanatory gap has vexed and intrigued philosophers and AI researchers alike for decades and caused considerable debate. Bridging this gap (that is, finding a satisfying mechanistic explanation for experience and qualia) is known as "the hard problem". The hardness of the problem is such that mysterians believe it can never be solved by humans. Ned Block argues that there also exists a "harder problem" of consciousness, due to the possibility of different physical and functional neurological systems potentially having phenomenal overlap.

An example of a phenomenon in which there is no gap is a modern computer's behavior, which can be adequately explained by its physical components alone, such as its circuitry and software. In contrast, it is thought by many mind-body dualists (e.g. René Descartes, David Chalmers) that subjective conscious experience constitutes a separate effect that demands another cause that is either outside the physical world (dualism) or due to an as yet unknown physical phenomenon (see for instance quantum mind, indirect realism).

Proponents of dualism claim that the mind is substantially and qualitatively different from the brain and that the existence of something metaphysically extra-physical is required to "fill the gap". Similarly, some argue that there are further facts—facts that do not follow logically from the physical facts of the world—about conscious experience. For example, they argue that what it is like to experience seeing red does not follow logically from the physical facts of the world.

In addition to the qualities of subjective experiences, the existence of personal identity also poses potential problems for physicalist philosophies. The question of why an individual has their particular personal identity has been called the vertiginous question by philosopher Benj Hellie, and has been termed the "Even Harder Problem of Consciousness" by Tim S. Roberts. However, proponents of open individualism may argue that the existence of personal identity is illusory.

== Implications ==
The nature of the explanatory gap is disputed. Some consider it to be simply a limit on our current explanatory ability. They argue that future neuroscience findings or philosophers' work could close the gap. Others argue that the gap is a definite limit on our cognitive abilities as humans—no amount of further information will allow us to close it. There is no consensus about what metaphysical conclusions the existence of the gap provides. Those who use its existence to support dualism have often assumed that an epistemic gap—particularly if it is a definite limit on our cognitive abilities—necessarily entails a metaphysical gap.

Joseph Levine and others opt to either remain silent on the matter or argue that no such metaphysical conclusion should be drawn. He agrees that conceivability (as used in the Zombie and inverted spectrum arguments) is flawed as a means of establishing metaphysical realities; but argues that even if we come to the metaphysical conclusion that qualia are physical, they still present an explanatory problem.

While I think this materialist response is right in the end, it does not suffice to put the mind-body problem to rest. Even if conceivability considerations do not establish that the mind is in fact distinct from the body, or that mental properties are metaphysically irreducible to physical properties, still they do demonstrate that we lack an explanation of the mental in terms of the physical.

However, such an epistemological or explanatory problem might indicate an underlying metaphysical issue—the non-physicality of qualia, even if not proven by conceivability arguments, is far from ruled out.

In the end, we are right back where we started. The explanatory gap argument doesn't demonstrate a gap in nature, but a gap in our understanding of nature. Of course, a plausible explanation for there being a gap in our understanding of nature is that there is a genuine gap in nature. But so long as we have countervailing reasons for doubting the latter, we have to look elsewhere for an explanation of the former.

According to Levine, the core of the problem is our lack of understanding of what it means for a qualitative experience to be fully comprehended. He emphasizes that we do not even know to what extent it is appropriate to inquire into the nature of this kind of experience. He uses the laws of gravity as an example, which laws seem to explain gravity completely, yet do not account for the gravitational constant. Similar to how gravity appears to be an inexplicable brute fact of nature, the case of qualia may be one in which we either lack essential information or explore a natural phenomenon that is not further apprehensible. Levine suggests that, for this reason, perhaps we should consider whether it is necessary to find a more complete explanation of qualitative experience.

Levine points out that understanding how much there is to be known about qualitative experience seems even more difficult because we lack a way to articulate what it means for actualities to be knowable in the manner he has in mind. He concludes that there are good reasons to want a more complete explanation of qualitative experiences. One is that consciousness appears to manifest only where mentality is demonstrated in physical systems that are quite highly organized. This, of course, may indicate a human capacity for reasoning that is no more than the result of organized functions. Levine argues that it seems counterintuitive to accept this implication that the human brain, so highly organized as it is, could be no more than a routine executor. He notes that while materialism appears to entail the reducibility of anything that is not physically primary to an explanation of its dependence on a mechanism that can be described in terms of physical fundamentals, that kind of reductionism does not attempt to reduce psychology to physical science. However, it still entails that inexplicable classes of facts are not treated as relevant to statements pertinent to psychology.

Christian List believes that the existence of first-personal facts provides a refutation of not only physicalist theories of consciousness, but also most standard versions of dualism.

Many philosophers have doubted that the explanatory gap can be solved. As proponents of the argument use it to support arguments against materialism, physicalism, and naturalism, its arguments appear to resist any scientific or philosophical solution to the problem. David Chalmers acknowledged that even when science somehow bridges the gap, the problem will persist.

== History ==
Leibniz's passage describing the explanatory gap is as follows:

It must be confessed, moreover, that perception, and that which depends on it, are inexplicable by mechanical causes, that is, by figures and motions, And, supposing that there were a mechanism so constructed as to think, feel and have perception, we might enter it as into a mill. And this granted, we should only find on visiting it, pieces which push one against another, but never anything by which to explain a perception. This must be sought, therefore, in the simple substance, and not in the composite or in the machine.

== See also ==
- Animal consciousness
- Binding problem
- Blindsight
- Causality
- Consciousness
- Eliminative materialism
- Explanation
- Functionalism (philosophy of mind)
- Further facts
- Idealism
- Innatism
- Ideasthesia
- Materialism
- Mind
- Mind-body problem
- New mysterianism
- Philosophical zombie
- Philosophy of mind
- Platonism
- Problem of other minds
- Qualia
- Reductionism
- Reverse engineering
- Sentience
- Solipsism
- Turing test
- Vertiginous question
- Vitalism
- Leibniz's gap
