= Feasibility =

Feasibility may refer to:

- Feasibility study, a preliminary study to determine a project's viability
- "Feasibility Study" (The Outer Limits), an episode of The Outer Limits TV show
- Feasible region, a region that satisfies mathematical constraints
- Logical possibility, an achievable thing

== See also ==
- Pragmatism
