= Keith Simmons =

Keith Simmons may refer to:

- Keith Simmons (philosopher) (fl. 1980s–2020s), American philosopher
- Keith Simmons (basketball) (born 1985), American professional basketball player

== See also ==
- Keith Simons (1954–2017), American football player
