= Further facts =

Metaphysical notion

In philosophy, further facts are facts that do not logically follow from the physical facts of the world. Reductionists who argue that at bottom there is nothing more than the physical facts thus argue against the existence of further facts. The concept of further facts plays a key role in some of the major works in analytic philosophy of the late 20th century, including in Derek Parfit's Reasons and Persons and David Chalmers's The Conscious Mind.

== Overview ==
One context in which the existence of further facts is debated is that of personal identity across time: in what sense is Alice today the same person as Alice yesterday, given that across the two days the state of her brain is different and the atoms that constitute her are different? On the one hand, we may believe that at bottom, there is nothing more than the atoms and their arrangement at different points in time; while we may for practical purposes come up with some notion of sameness of a person, this notion does not reflect anything deeper about reality. Under such a view there would be no further facts. On the other hand, we may believe that there is an additional fact of the matter whether Alice yesterday and Alice today really are the same person. For example, if we believe in Cartesian souls, we may believe that Alice yesterday and Alice today are the same person if and only if they correspond to the same soul. Or we may not believe in Cartesian souls, but yet believe that whether Alice yesterday and Alice today are the same person is a question about something other than facts about which atoms constitute them and how they are arranged. These would both be further-fact views.

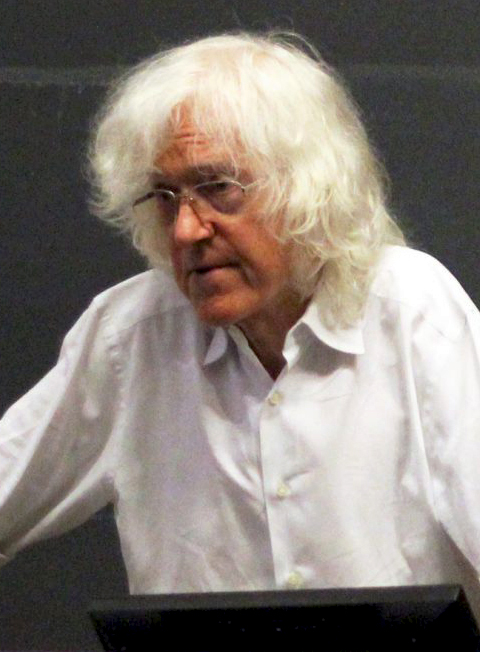
Derek Parfit

This debate about further facts concerning personal identity over time is most closely associated with Derek Parfit. In his Reasons and Persons, he describes the non-reductionist's view that "personal identity is a deep further fact, distinct from physical and psychological continuity". Parfit takes a reductionist stance and argues against this further-fact view. As a result it is not clear whether a person has any reason to be worried about his or her future self in a special way that does not also apply to worrying about others: Parfit argues that it is plausible that "only the [implausible] deep further fact gives me a reason to be specially concerned about my future". Sydney Shoemaker objected that it is not clear how a further fact would give a reason for such special concerns either; Harold Langsam attempted to give a positive account of how a further fact would give such a reason.

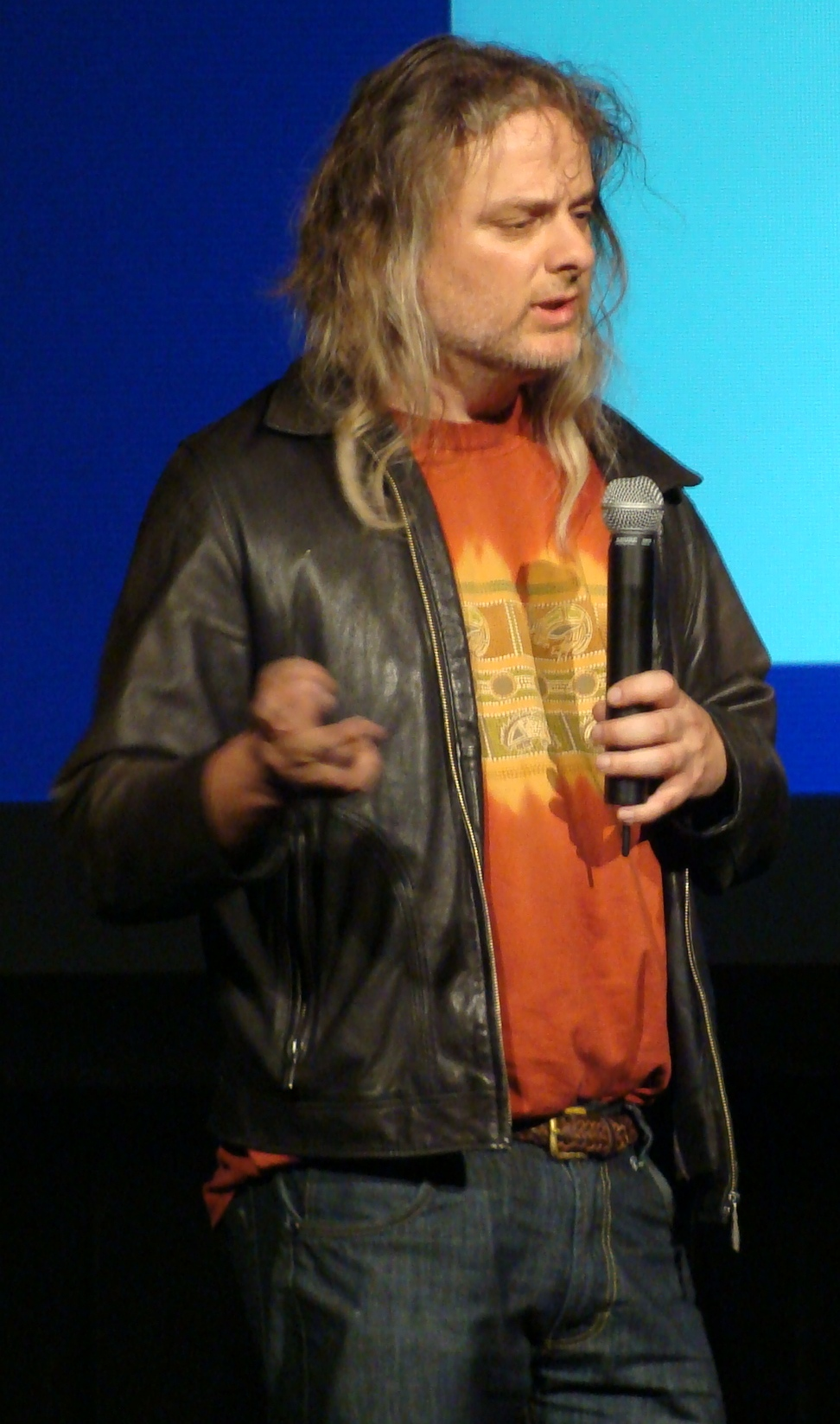
David Chalmers

David Chalmers lists some other candidates for further facts. One is facts about conscious experience. For example, it is difficult to see how it follows from the physical facts what it is like to experience seeing red; indeed, inverted spectrum scenarios, where we imagine that experiences of colors are swapped without anything else changing, suggest that the experience of red-seeing could have been a different one without the physical facts changing. Another candidate for a further fact is that there is any conscious experience at all, rather than everyone being a philosophical zombie. (Christopher Hill and Brian Mclaughlin argued against the idea that facts about consciousness are further facts, disputing the logical possibility of a world physically identical to ours in which the facts about consciousness are different.)

Chalmers also considers indexicality. He cites the fact that "I am David Chalmers", noting that its significance seems to go beyond the tautology that David Chalmers is David Chalmers. (See also Caspar Hare's egocentric presentism and Benj Hellie's vertiginous question.) Similarly, in the philosophy of time, what date and time it is now might be considered a candidate for a further fact, in the sense that a being that knows everything about the full four-dimensional block of spacetime would still not know what time it is now. (See also the A-theory and the B-theory of time.)

Chalmers also considers negative facts. For example, a statement like "there do not exist nonphysical angels." If in fact true, it does not seem that this logically follows from any of the physical facts by themselves; but, he argues, it would follow if one added a "That is all" statement at the end of the list of all the physical facts.

Vincent Conitzer has devised a number of thought experiments involving the detection of further facts. He imagines a sequence of hypothetical realities where further facts exist, but where the different realities exist along a spectrum of how difficult it is for observers within each reality to conclude that further facts must exist. On one end of the spectrum is a reality where the observer can easily conclude that further facts exist. On the other end is our reality, where the existence of further facts is more ambiguous. Conitzer argues that it is unclear where along the sequence it stops becoming trivial to prove that further facts must exist.

== See also ==
- Centered world
- Simulation hypothesis
