= Thought and World =

2002 book by Christopher S. Hill

- Author: Christopher S. Hill
- Subject: Consciousness
- Published: 2002
- Publisher: Cambridge University Press
- Pages: 170 pp.
- ISBN: 9780521892438

Thought and World: An Austere Portrayal of Truth, Reference, and Semantic Correspondence is a 2002 book by Christopher S. Hill in which he presents a theory of the content of semantic notions that are applied to thoughts.

== Reception ==
The book has been reviewed by Keith Simmons, Anil Gupta and Marian David.
