= Leibniz's gap =

Philosophical problem

In the philosophy of mind, Leibniz's gap (or Leibniz's mill) is the problem that thoughts cannot be observed or perceived solely by examining brain properties, events, and processes. Here the word "gap" is a metaphor of a subquestion regarding the mind–body problem that allegedly must be answered in order to reach a more profound understanding of qualia, consciousness and emergence. A theory that could correlate brain phenomena with psychological phenomena would "bridge the gap".

The term Leibniz's gap was coined by Robert Cummins and was named after Gottfried Leibniz, who first presented the problem in his work The Monadology in 1714. Leibniz's passage describing the gap goes as follows:

It must be confessed, moreover, that perception, and that which depends on it, are inexplicable by mechanical causes, that is, by figures and motions, And, supposing that there were a mechanism so constructed as to think, feel and have perception, we might enter it as into a mill. And this granted, we should only find on visiting it, pieces which push one against another, but never anything by which to explain a perception. This must be sought, therefore, in the simple substance, and not in the composite or in the machine.

— Gottfried Leibniz, Monadology, sect. 17

The problem is that there is a gap between concepts of modern neuroscience, and those that we use to describe the mind, such as "thought", "feeling", and "perception". This means that the physical observation of the brain yields data, substantially, with the format of electric potentials, even if we are convinced that the mind is the brain. Leibniz himself sought to bridge the gap by introducing monads to explain the existence of immaterial, eternal souls.

Leibniz's gap, however, applies to materialism and dualism alike. This brought late 19th century scientists to conclude that psychology must build on introspection; thus introspectionism was born. Computationalism seeks to answer the problem proposed by Leibniz's gap through functional analysis of the brain and its processes. There is the position that functionalism could address the gap since it allows something to be described in terms of what it does without explaining how it does it or identifying the physical form it takes. Today, however, Leibniz's gap is still in wide use in scientific debate inasmuch as the mind-body problem that remains unsolved.

== See also ==
- Hard problem of consciousness
- Explanatory gap
- Cognitive science
