= Liam Kofi Bright =

British philosopher

Academic background
- Education: University of Warwick; London School of Economics; Carnegie Mellon University
- Thesis: Valuing Questions (2018)
- Doctoral advisor: Kevin Zollman
- Other advisor: Christian List
- Influences: W. E. B. Du Bois

Academic work
- Discipline: Philosophy
- Sub-discipline: Epistemology; philosophy of science
- School or tradition: Logical positivism
- Institutions: London School of Economics
- Main interests: Africana philosophy; formal epistemology; intersectionality; social epistemology
- Website: liamkofibright.com

Liam Kofi Bright is a British philosopher of science and assistant professor at the Department of Philosophy, Logic, and Scientific Methods at the London School of Economics. He works primarily on science and truth, as well as formal social epistemology. Some of his other work has been on Africana philosophy and formal modelling of social phenomena like intersectionality. Bright won the Philip Leverhulme Prize in the category of philosophy and theology in 2020.

== Early life and education ==
Bright received a bachelor's degree in philosophy from the University of Warwick, a Master of Science degree in the philosophy of science from the London School of Economics and Political Science, and Ph.D from the philosophy department at Carnegie Mellon University under the direction of Kevin Zollman.

== Work ==
Most of Bright's work involves formal models of the epistemology of science and institutional scientific practices such as peer review. Some of his other work has revolved around the thought of Africana philosophers like W. E. B. Du Bois (whose work he has twice been invited to BBC Radio 4 to discuss) and on formalizations of phenomena like intersectionality.
