= Consciousness (Hill book) =

2009 book by Christopher S. Hill

- First edition
- Author: Christopher S. Hill
- Subject: Consciousness
- Published: 2009
- Publisher: Cambridge University Press
- Pages: 276
- ISBN: 978-0-521-12521-5

Consciousness is a 2009 book by Christopher S. Hill, in which the author offers explanations of six forms of consciousness: agent consciousness, propositional consciousness, introspective consciousness, relational consciousness, phenomenal consciousness, and experiential consciousness.

== Reception ==
The book has been reviewed by Joseph Levine, Fred Dretske, Daniel Stoljar, Adam Pautz, Ellen Fridland, Erhan Demircioglu and Gabriel Jucá.
