= Problem of other minds =

Epistemological problem

The problem of other minds is an epistemological problem, and is traditionally stated as the following question: "Given that I can only observe the behavior of others, how can I know that others have minds?". The problem is that knowledge of other minds is always indirect. The problem of other minds does not negatively impact social interactions due to people having a "theory of mind" – the ability to spontaneously infer the mental states of others – supported by innate mirror neurons, a theory of mind mechanism, or a tacit theory. There has also been an increase in evidence that behavior results from cognition, which in turn requires a brain, and often involves consciousness.

It is a problem of the philosophical idea known as solipsism: the notion that for any person only one's own mind is known to exist. The problem of other minds maintains that no matter how sophisticated someone's behavior is, that does not reasonably guarantee that someone has the presence of thought occurring within them as when oneself engages in behavior. Phenomenology studies the subjective experience of human life resulting from consciousness. The specific subject within phenomenology studying other minds is intersubjectivity.

In 1953, Karl Popper suggested that a test for the other minds problem is whether one would seriously argue with the other person or machine: "This, I think, would solve the problem of 'other minds'....In arguing with other people (a thing which we have learnt from other people), for example about other minds, we cannot but attribute to them intentions, and this means mental states. We do not argue with a thermometer."

Philosophers such as Christian List have argued that there exists a connection between the problem of other minds and Benj Hellie's vertiginous question, i.e. why people exist as themselves and not as someone else. List argues that there exists a "quadrilemma" for metaphysical consciousness theories where at least one of the following must be false: 'first-person realism', 'non-solipsism', 'non-fragmentation', and 'one world'. List proposes a philosophical model he calls the "many-worlds theory of consciousness" in order to reconcile the subjective nature of consciousness without lapsing into solipsism.

Caspar Hare has argued for a weak form of solipsism with the concept of egocentric presentism, in which other persons can be conscious, but their experiences are simply not present in the way one's own current experience is. A related concept is perspectival realism, in which things within perceptual awareness have a defining intrinsic property that exists absolutely and not relative to anything, of which several other philosophers have written reviews. Vincent Conitzer has argued for similar ideas on the basis of there being a connection between the A-theory of time and the nature of the self. He argues that one's current perspective could be "metaphysically privileged" on the basis of arguments for A-theory being stronger as arguments for both A-theory and a metaphysically privileged self, and arguments against A-theory are ineffective against this combined position.

== See also ==
- Animal consciousness
- Binding problem
- Boltzmann brain
- Brain in a vat
- Chinese room
- Dream argument
- Ethics of uncertain sentience
- Explanatory gap
- Hard problem of consciousness
- Mind–body problem
- Open individualism
- Philosophical skepticism
- Philosophical zombie
- Philosophy of mind
- Psychophysics
- Qualia
- Theory of mind
- Turing test
