= Peter Alward =

Canadian philosopher

- Born: Peter Wallace Brannen Alward; 1964 (age 61–62)

Education
- Education: University of North Carolina at Chapel Hill (PhD)
- Thesis: Believed World Semantics (1998)
- Doctoral advisor: William Lycan, Keith Simmons

Philosophical work
- Era: 21st-century philosophy
- Region: Western philosophy
- School: Analytic
- Institutions: University of Saskatchewan
- Main interests: Philosophy of fiction
- Website: https://peteralward.wordpress.com/

Peter Wallace Brannen Alward (born 1964) is a Canadian philosopher. He is a Professor in Philosophy and at the University of Saskatchewan. He is known for his works on philosophy of fiction, philosophy of art and environmental philosophy. In 2016 Alward was awarded Tenured Professor Essay Prize by The Canadian Philosophical Association.

== Books ==
- Philosophical Problems: an introductory text in philosophy, Broadview, 2017.
- Empty Revelations: an essay on talk about, and attitudes toward, fiction, McGill-Queen's University Press, 2012.
