= Reality+ (book) =

Book about technology philosophy

Reality+ is a book by David Chalmers, originally published in January 2022. This book is an exploration into technology philosophy, or as Chalmers refers to it: technophilosophy. Chalmers delves into the metaphysics and epistemology, and ethics of reality, incorporating the works of Descartes' evil demon, and Bostrom's simulation hypothesis, to try to answer some new, and some fundamental questions of reality. Chalmers writes that if it is possible to create fully convincing simulated worlds, it is likely that our reality is one as well, as such worlds would likely outnumber original realities. He argues that such a virtual world is just as real as the one that contains it. Chalmers also discusses virtual reality (VR) technology and predicts that brain–computer interfaces will allow for virtual worlds that are "indistinguishable from the nonvirtual world" over which they will be preferred.

The book was listed as one of The Washington Post's best nonfiction books of 2022. In a review, Jeff Kaiser called it "frequently weird, wild and wonderful", but found Chalmers's "techno-optimism" less convincing than its central thesis. PD Smith of The Guardian praised Reality+ as a "brilliant and very readable philosophical investigation".
