= Inverted spectrum =

Thought experiment

The inverted spectrum is the hypothetical scenario, pertaining to the philosophy of color, of two people sharing their color vocabulary and discriminations, although the colors one sees—that person's qualia—are systematically different from the colors the other person sees.

== Overview ==
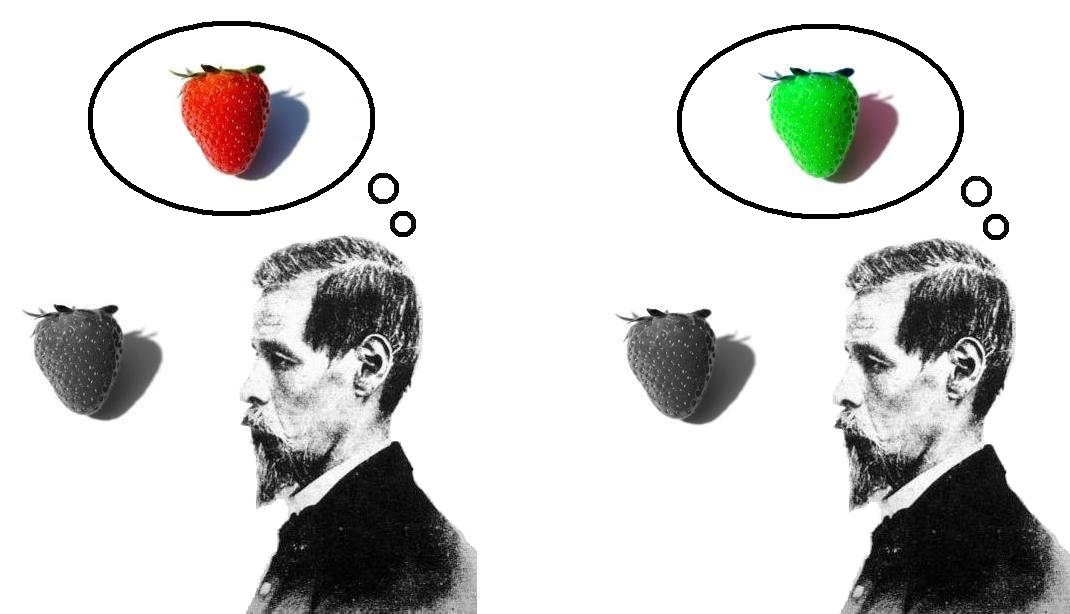
Inverted qualia.

The concept dates back to John Locke as a thought experiment. Two individuals who perceive colors differently: where one person sees red, the other sees green, and vice versa. Despite this difference in their subjective experiences, they behave and communicate as if their perceptions are the same, and no physical or behavioral test can reveal the inversion. Critics of functionalism, and of physicalism more broadly, argue that if we can imagine this happening without contradiction, it follows that we are imagining a change in a property that determines the way things look to us, but that has no physical basis. In more detail:

1. Metaphysical identity holds of necessity
2. If something is possibly false, it is not necessary
3. It is conceivable that qualia could have a different relationship to physical brain-states
4. If it is conceivable, then it is possible
5. Since it is possible for qualia to have a different relationship with physical brain-states, they cannot be identical to brain states (by 1).
6. Therefore, qualia are non-physical.

The argument suggests that if the inverted spectrum is conceivable, then qualia exist and are non-physical. Some philosophers question the validity of this argument, noting that it involves assumptions about conceivability and possibility.

C. L. Hardin criticizes the idea that an inverted spectrum would be undetectable on scientific grounds:

...there are more perceptually distinguishable shades between red and blue than there are between green and yellow, which would make red-green inversion behaviorally detectable. And there are yet further asymmetries. Dark yellow is brown (qualitatively different from yellow), whereas dark blue is blue[...] Similarly, desaturated bluish-red is pink (qualitatively different from saturated bluish-red), whereas desaturated greenish-yellow is similar to saturated greenish-yellow. Again, red is a "warm" color, whereas blue is "cool"—and perhaps this is not a matter of learned associations with temperature.

Paul Churchland using the Hurvich–Jameson (H–J) opponent process criticizes the inverted spectrum on scientific grounds:

If the Hurvich–Jameson account of our color experiences is correct, then it is empirically impossible to change the profile of our subjective color responses to the world without changing in some way the response profile of our opponent cell activation vectors, as outlined, for example, in the preceding paragraph. From this reductive perspective, sundry qualia inversions are indeed possible, but not without the appropriate rewirings within the entirely physical H–J net that embodies and sustains all of our color experience. If we wish to resist this deliberately reductive account—as some will—then let us endeavor to find in it some real empirical failing. Imaginary failings simply don't matter.

In some cases, the inverted spectrum scenario may be possible, particularly in a simulated environment. For example, if a world is simulated on a computer and observed through the eyes of one of the characters, it is conceivable that the spectrum of colors could be inverted from the observer's perspective. This could be achieved by making small changes to the code governing how colors are displayed, such that what was previously shown as green might now appear as red, without altering the underlying simulated physics. However, this addresses only the display of colors, not the qualia of the virtual character, if such an agent were capable of having qualia. It is unclear whether such examples from simulations provide evidence for the possibility of inverted spectra in ordinary life.

In his book I Am a Strange Loop, Douglas Hofstadter argues that the inverted spectrum argument entails a form of solipsism in which people can have no idea about what goes on in the minds of others—contrary to the central theme of his work. He presents several variants to demonstrate the absurdity of this idea: the "inverted political spectrum", in which one person's concept of liberty is identical to another's concept of imprisonment; an inverted "sonic spectrum" in which low musical notes sound like "high" ones and vice versa (which he says is impossible because low sounds can be felt physically as vibrations); and a version in which random, complex qualia such as riding a roller coaster or opening presents are reversed, so that everyone perceives the world in radically different, unknowable ways.

Inverted spectrum arguments have applications to behavioralism, physicalism, representationalism, functionalism, skepticism and the hard problem of consciousness.

== See also ==
- Dualism (philosophy of mind)
- Functionalism
- Further facts
- Mary's room
- Ontological argument
- Philosophical zombies
- Philosophy of color
- Philosophy of mind
- Philosophy of perception
- Physicalism
- Qualia
- Subjective character of experience
- The map is not the territory
