= Robert Kirk (philosopher) =

British philosopher

Robert Kirk (born 1933) is a British philosopher. He is emeritus professor in the Department of Philosophy at the University of Nottingham.

Kirk is best known for his work on philosophical zombies—putatively unconscious beings physically and behaviourally identical to human beings. Although Kirk did not invent this idea, he introduced the term zombie in his 1974 papers "Sentience and Behaviour" and "Zombies v. Materialists". In the latter he offered a formulation of physicalism that aimed to make clear that if zombies are possible, physicalism is false: an argument that was not much noticed until David Chalmers's development of it in The Conscious Mind. Kirk himself had reversed his position earlier, and has argued against the zombie idea in a number of books and articles on physicalism and consciousness.

As well as working on other topics in the philosophy of mind, Kirk has published on the question of how far translation and interpretation are determined by objective facts (see W. V. Quine's Word and Object (1960)). His own book on this topic, Translation Determined, appeared in 1986. Another main interest is relativism.

== Selected bibliography ==
- Chalmers, David (1996). The Conscious Mind: in Search of a Fundamental Theory. Oxford University Press. ISBN 978-0-19-510553-7.
- Kirk, Robert (January 1974). "Sentience and Behaviour". Mind. 83 (329): 43–60. doi:10.1093/mind/lxxxiii.329.43. JSTOR 2252795.
- — (1974). "Zombies v. Materialists". Proceedings of the Aristotelian Society. 48 (Suppl): 135–152. doi:10.1093/aristoteliansupp/48.1.135.
- — (1979). "From Physical Explicability to Full-blooded Materialism". Philosophical Quarterly. 29 (116): 229–37. doi:10.2307/2218819. JSTOR 2218819.
- — (1986). Translation Determined. Oxford University Press. ISBN 978-0-19-824921-4.
- — (1994). Raw Feeling. Oxford University Press. ISBN 0-19-823679-4.
- — (1999). Relativism and Reality. Routledge.
- — (2003). Mind and Body. Acumen.
- — (2004). "Indeterminacy of Translation". The Cambridge Companion to Quine. pp. 151–80. doi:10.1017/CCOL0521630568.007. ISBN 9780521630566.
- — (2005). Zombies and Consciousness. Oxford University Press. ISBN 0-19-928548-9.
- — (2008). "The Inconceivability of Zombies". Philosophical Studies. 139: 73–98. doi:10.1007/s11098-007-9103-2. S2CID 170126603.
- — (2013). The Conceptual Link from Physical to Mental. Oxford University Press.
- — (2017). Robots, Zombies and Us. Bloomsbury.
