= Thomas Metzinger =

German philosopher (born 1958)

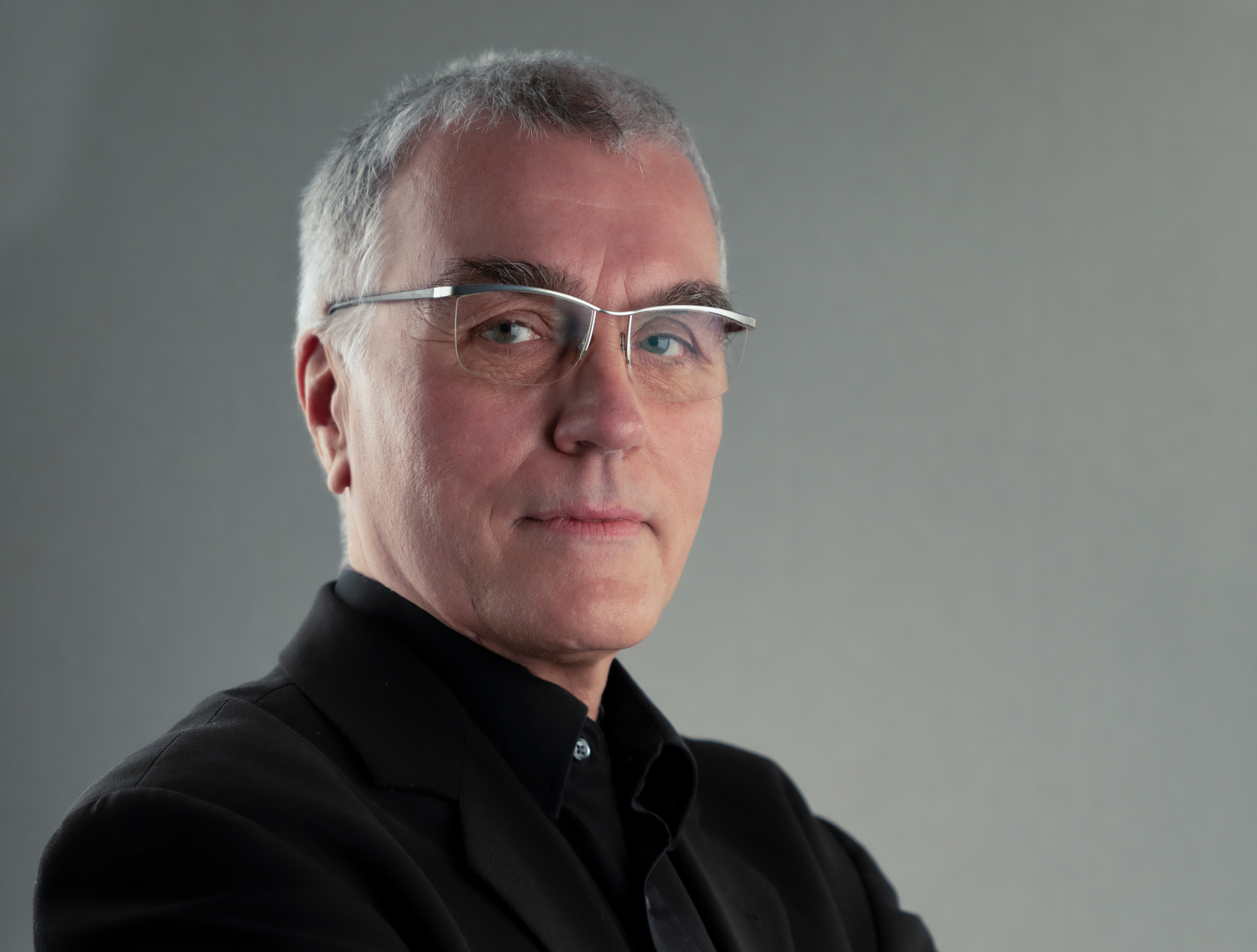
- Metzinger in 2022
- Born: 12 March 1958 (age 68); Frankfurt, West Germany

Education
- Education: Goethe University Frankfurt

Philosophical work
- Era: Contemporary philosophy
- Region: Western philosophy
- School: Analytic
- Institutions: University of Giessen; University of Osnabrück; University of Mainz
- Main interests: Philosophy of mind; Cognitive science; Neurophilosophy; Applied ethics
- Notable ideas: Phenomenal self-model (PSM)

Thomas Metzinger (German: [ˈmɛtsɪŋɐ]; born 12 March 1958) is a German philosopher and Professor Emeritus of theoretical philosophy at the University of Mainz. His primary research areas include philosophy of mind, philosophy of neuroscience, and applied ethics, particularly focusing on neurotechnology, virtual reality, and artificial intelligence. He has argued in his book Being No One that the phenomenal self is a mental construct created by the brain. His 2024 book The Elephant and the Blind compiled extensive research on meditation.

== Academic career ==
Metzinger studied philosophy, ethnology, and theology at Goethe University Frankfurt. He received his doctorate there in 1985, with a thesis on the mind-body problem. In 1992, he completed his habilitation at the University of Giessen. In 2000, Metzinger was appointed professor of philosophy of cognitive science at Osnabrück University, but moved to the University of Mainz in the same year.

Metzinger cofounded in 1994 of the Association for the Scientific Study of Consciousness, of which he has been a board and committee member, and was the 2010 president. From 2005 to 2007 he was president of the German Cognitive Science Society. Metzinger is an Adjunct Fellow at the Frankfurt Institute for Advanced Studies, a co-founder of the German Effective Altruism Foundation, president of the Barbara Wengeler Foundation, and on the advisory board of the Giordano Bruno Foundation and the MIND Foundation. From 2008 to 2009, he served as a Fellow at the Berlin Institute for Advanced Study; from 2014 to 2019, he was a Fellow at the Gutenberg Research College; from 2019 to 2022, he was awarded a Senior-Forschungsprofessur by the Ministry of Science, Education and Culture. In 2019 he founded the MPE project. From 2018 to 2020, Metzinger worked as a member of the European Commission’s High-Level Expert Group on Artificial Intelligence. In 2022 he was elected into the German National Academy of Sciences Leopoldina.

Thomas Metzinger has studied and discussed "minimal phenomenal selfhood." This is a part of a broader research goal that Thomas Metzinger has of finding "pure consciousness," which is consciousness in itself without there being anything to be conscious of (eg., no sense of time or space, no sense of self, etc). This is in contrast to research of what parts of the brain are needed or associated with consciousness (see neural correlates of consciousness). One example of pure consciousness that Thomas Metzinger discusses is a lucid deep sleep, which is a state of deep sleep (ie., a sleep where the individual is not aware of anything) where the individual is aware themselves in this deep sleep (similar to a lucid dream). The aim of this research is to find what can be removed from conscious experience without becoming unconscious, similar to ideal gas laws. Thomas Metzinger has personally experienced lucid deep sleep, and talks about this experience (among his many other experiences with meditation) on the Within Reason Podcast.

== Personal life ==
Metzinger has practiced meditation twice a day for over forty years. He has recommended vipassana practice.

Around 1980, the young Metzinger had a formative meeting with philosopher-mystic Jiddu Krishnamurti. He has referred to Krishnamurti as "one of the greatest non-academic philosophers of the last century".

== Bibliography ==
Monographs

- (1985) Neuere Beiträge zur Diskussion des Leib-Seele-Problems. Peter Lang, Frankfurt am Main, ISBN 3-8204-8927-4.
- (1993) Subjekt und Selbstmodell. Die Perspektivität phänomenalen Bewußtseins vor dem Hintergrund einer naturalistischen Theorie mentaler Repräsentation. mentis, Paderborn, ISBN 3-89785-081-8.
- (2003) Being No One. The Self-Model Theory of Subjectivity. MIT Press, Cambridge, Massachusetts, ISBN 0-262-13417-9 (hardcover)/ISBN 0262633086 (paperback).
- (2009) The Ego Tunnel – The Science of the Mind and the Myth of the Self Basic Books, New York, ISBN 0-465-04567-7.
- (2009) Der Ego-Tunnel – Eine neue Philosophie des Selbst: Von der Hirnforschung zur Bewusstseinsethik Berlin Verlag, Berlin, ISBN 3-8270-0630-9.
- (2010) Der Ego Tunnel. Eine neue Philosophie des Selbst: Von der Hirnforschung zur Bewusstseinsethik. Berlin: Berlin Verlag. ISBN 978-3-8270-7037-1.
- (2011) Being No One. The Self-Model Theory of Subjectivity. Cambridge MA: MIT Press.
- (2023) Bewusstseinskultur – Spiritualität, intellektuelle Redlichkeit und die planetare Krise. Berlin, Berlin Verlag. ISBN 978-3-8270-1488-7.
- (2023) Der Elefant und die Blinden. Berlin Verlag, Berlin, ISBN 978-3-8270-1487-0.
- (2024) The Elephant and the Blind. Cambridge, MA, MIT Press ISBN 978-0-2625-4710-9.

Editorship

- (1995) Bewußtsein – Beiträge aus der Gegenwartsphilosophie., Paderborn, mentis, Paderborn, ISBN 3-89785-012-5.
- (1995) Conscious Experience. Imprint Academic, Thorverton und mentis, Paderborn, ISBN 0-907845-10-X (Hardcover)
- (2000) Neural Correlates of Consciousness – Empirical and Conceptual Questions. MIT Press, Cambridge, Massachusetts, ISBN 0-262-13370-9 (Hardcover).
- (2006) Grundkurs Philosophie des Geistes – Band 1: Phänomenales Bewusstsein mentis, Paderborn, ISBN 3-89785-551-8.
- (2007) Grundkurs Philosophie des Geistes – Band 2: Das Leib-Seele-Problem mentis, Paderborn, ISBN 3-89785-552-6.
- (2010) Grundkurs Philosophie des Geistes – Band 3: Intentionalität und mentale Repräsentation mentis Paderborn, ISBN 978-3-89785-553-3. All three volumes can be purchased for 78 Euros, ISBN 978-3-89785-554-0.
- (2015, with Jennifer M. Windt). Open MIND-collection, Frankfurt am Main: MIND Group. ISBN 978-3-95857-102-0.
- (2017, with Wanja Wiese). Philosophy and Predictive Processing-collection, Frankfurt am Main: MIND Group. ISBN 978-3-95857-138-9.
- (2020, with Raphaël Millière). Radical Disruptions of Self-Consciousness, Frankfurt am Main: MIND Group. ISSN 2699-0369.
