= Keith Simmons (philosopher) =

American philosopher

- Born: Keith Eric George Simmons
- Awards: National Humanities Center Fellowship, Institute of the Arts and Humanities Borden Fellowship, University Distinguished Teaching Award

Education
- Education: University of Keele (BA); University College London (MPhil); UCLA (PhD)
- Thesis: The Liar Paradox (1987)
- Doctoral advisor: Tyler Burge
- Other advisors: Donald A. Martin, David Kaplan, Marilyn McCord Adams

Philosophical work
- Era: 21st-century philosophy
- Region: Western philosophy
- School: Analytic
- Institutions: University of Connecticut, UNC Chapel Hill
- Doctoral students: Peter Alward
- Main interests: Logic, philosophy of mind
- Website: https://www.keithegsimmons.com/

Keith Eric George Simmons is an American philosopher and Professor of Philosophy at University of Connecticut. He is known for his works on logic and philosophy of mind.

== Books ==
- Semantic Singularities: Paradoxes of Reference, Predication, and Truth, Oxford University Press 2018
- Truth (Oxford Readings in Philosophy), edited with Simon Blackburn, Oxford University Press 1999
- Universality and the Liar: An Essay on Truth and the Diagonal Argument, Cambridge University Press 1993

== See also ==
- Cantor's diagonal argument
