= Christopher S. Hill =

American philosopher (born 1942)

- Born: 1942 (age 83–84)
- Awards: National Humanities Center Fellowship

Education
- Education: Harvard University (Ph.D.)
- Thesis: On the Mysteries of Belief (1973)
- Doctoral advisor: Israel Scheffler, Hilary Putnam

Philosophical work
- Era: 21st-century philosophy
- Region: Western philosophy
- School: Analytic
- Institutions: Brown University
- Main interests: consciousness, philosophy of mind, philosophy of language

Christopher S. Hill (born 1942) is an American philosopher and William Herbert Perry Faunce Professor of Philosophy at Brown University. He is known for his expertise on consciousness and philosophy of mind.

== Career ==
Hill previously taught at the University of Pittsburgh, Case Western Reserve University, the University of Michigan, the University of Arkansas, and Massachusetts Institute of Technology. He has held various fellowships from the National Endowment for the Humanities and is a fellow at the National Humanities Center. Hill is a former editor of Philosophical Topics and a former associate editor of Noûs.

== Books ==
- Perceptual Experience (Oxford University Press, 2022)
- Meaning, Mind, and Knowledge (Oxford University Press, 2014)
- Consciousness (Cambridge University Press, 2009)
- Thought and World (Cambridge University Press, 2002)
- Sensations (Cambridge University Press, 1991)
