= Christian List =

German political scientist (born 1973)

Christian List FBA
- Born: 7 November 1973 (age 52); Nastätten, Rhineland-Palatinate, West Germany

Academic background
- Education: St Peter's College, Oxford; Nuffield College, Oxford
- Thesis: Mission Impossible? (2001)
- Doctoral advisor: Iain McLean

Academic work
- Discipline: Philosophy; political science
- School or tradition: Analytic philosophy
- Institutions: London School of Economics; LMU Munich
- Notable students: Liam Kofi Bright
- Main interests: Formal epistemology; philosophy of social science; political philosophy; social choice theory
- Website: christianlist.net

Christian List (born 1973) is a German philosopher and political scientist who serves as professor of philosophy and decision theory at LMU Munich and co-director of the Munich Center for Mathematical Philosophy. He was previously professor of political science and philosophy at the London School of Economics. List's research interests relate to social choice theory, formal epistemology, political philosophy, and the philosophy of social science.

Born in Nastätten, Germany, on 7 November 1973, List earned his Bachelor of Arts and Master of Philosophy degrees at St Peter's College, and his Doctor of Philosophy degree at Nuffield College, both University of Oxford. In the Fall of 2011, he was a Fellow at the Swedish Collegium for Advanced Study in Uppsala, Sweden. List was elected to the British Academy in 2014, the United Kingdom's national academy for the humanities and social sciences.

== Selected publications ==
- Independence and Interdependence: Lessons from the Hive. London School of Economics and Political Science, London, 2010. (With Adrian Vermeule)
- Where Do Preferences Come From? London School of Economics and Political Science, London, 2010. (With Franz Dietrich)
- Group Agency: The Possibility, Design, and Status of Corporate Agents. Oxford University Press, Oxford, 2011. (With Philip Pettit)
- "Emergent Chance", The Philosophical Review, 124 (1), 2015, pp. 119–152. (With Marcus Pivato)
- Why Free Will Is Real. May 6, 2019, Harvard University Press; ASIN B07Q7H1PGD
