= Logical possibility =

Logical proposition that cannot be disproved

A logical possibility is a logical proposition that cannot be disproved, using the axioms and rules of a given system of logic. The logical possibility of a proposition will depend upon the system of logic being considered, rather than on the violation of any single rule. Some systems of logic restrict inferences from inconsistent propositions or even allow for true contradictions. Other logical systems have more than two truth-values instead of a binary of such values. Some assume the system in question is classical propositional logic. Similarly, the criterion for logical possibility is often based on whether or not a proposition is contradictory and as such, is often thought of as the broadest type of possibility.

In modal logic, a logical proposition is possible if it is true in some possible world. The universe of "possible worlds" depends upon the axioms and rules of the logical system in which one is working, but given some logical system, any logically consistent collection of statements is a possible world. The modal diamond operator $\lozenge$ is used to express possibility: $\lozenge P$ denotes "proposition $P$ is possible".

Logical possibility is different from other sorts of subjunctive possibilities. The relationship between modalities (if there is any) is the subject of debate and may depend upon how one views logic, as well as the relationship between logic and metaphysics, for example, many philosophers following Saul Kripke have held that discovered identities such as "Hesperus = Phosphorus" are metaphysically necessary because they pick out the same object in all possible worlds where the terms have a referent. It is logically possible for “Hesperus = Phosphorus” to be false, since denying it does not violate a logical rule such as consistency. Other philosophers are of the view that logical possibility is broader than metaphysical possibility, so that anything which is metaphysically possible is also logically possible.

== See also ==
- Modal logic
- Paraconsistent logic
- Paradox
- Possibility theory
- Possible world
- Subjunctive possibility

== Bibliography ==
- Brian F. Chellas (1980). Modal Logic: An Introduction. Cambridge University Press. ISBN 978-0-521-29515-4.
