= Emergent materialism =

Philosophical concept

In the philosophy of mind, emergent (or emergentist) materialism is a theory which asserts that the mind is irreducibly existent in some sense. However, the mind does not exist in the sense of being an ontological simple. Further, the study of mental phenomena is independent of other sciences. The theory primarily maintains that the human mind's evolution is a product of material nature and that it cannot exist without material basis.

== Overview ==
The view holds that mental properties emerge as novel properties of complex material systems. These are conceptually irreducible as physical properties of the complexes that have them. The theory, however, states that the mind is independent due to the causal influences between body and mind. This is described as a "primitive relation" that is grounded in or dependent on the physical, but with metaphysical necessity.

Emergent materialism can be divided into emergence which denies mental causation and emergence which allows for causal effect. A version of the latter type has been advocated by John R. Searle, called biological naturalism.

The other main group of materialist views in the philosophy of mind can be labeled non-emergent (or non-emergentist) materialism, and includes pure physicalism (eliminative materialism), identity theory (reductive materialism), philosophical behaviorism, and functionalism.

== See also ==
- Cartesian dualism
- Emergentism
- Emergence
- Epiphenomenalism
- Materialism
- Mind–body problem
- Monism
- Physicalism
