= Causal closure =

Metaphysical theory

Physical causal closure is a metaphysical theory about the nature of causation in the physical realm with significant ramifications in the study of metaphysics and the mind. In a strongly stated version, physical causal closure says that "all physical states have pure physical causes" — Jaegwon Kim, or that "physical effects have only physical causes" — Agustin Vincente, p. 150.

Those who accept the theory tend, in general although not exclusively, to the physicalist view that all entities that exist are physical entities. As Karl Popper says, "The physicalist principle of closedness of the physical ... is of decisive importance and I take it as the characteristic principle of physicalism or materialism."

== Definition ==
Physical causal closure has stronger and weaker formulations.

The stronger formulations assert that no physical event has a cause outside the physical domain — Jaegwon Kim. That is, they assert that for physical events, causes other than physical causes do not exist. (Physical events that are not causally determined may be said to have their objective chances of occurrence determined by physical causes.)

Weaker forms of the theory state that "Every physical event has a physical cause." — Barbara Montero, or that "Every physical effect (that is, caused event) has physical sufficient causes" — Agustin Vincente, (According to Vincente, a number of caveats have to be observed, among which is the postulate that "physical entities" are entities postulated by a true theory of physics, a theory of which we are ignorant today, and that such a true theory "will not include mental (or in general, dubious) concepts" (Note 5, p. 168).) or that "if we trace the causal ancestry of a physical event we need never go outside the physical domain." — Jaegwon Kim. Weaker forms of physical causal closure are synonymous with the causal completeness, the notion that "Every physical effect that has a sufficient cause has a sufficient physical cause." That is, weaker forms allow that in addition to physical causes, there may be other kinds of causes for physical events.

The notion of reductionism supplements physical causal closure with the claim that all events ultimately can be reduced to physical events. Under these circumstances, mental events are a subset of physical events and caused by them.

== Importance ==
Physical causal closure is especially important when considering dualist theories of mind. If no physical event has a cause outside the physical realm, it would follow that non-physical mental events would be causally impotent in the physical world. However, as Kim has agreed, it seems intuitively problematic to strip mental events of their causal power. Only epiphenomenalists would agree that mental events do not have causal power, but epiphenomenalism is objectionable to many philosophers. One way of maintaining the causal powers of mental events is to assert token identity non-reductive physicalism—that mental properties supervene on neurological properties. That is, there can be no change in the mental without a corresponding change in the physical. Yet this implies that mental events can have two causes (physical and mental), a situation which apparently results in overdetermination (redundant causes), and denies the strong physical causal closure. Kim argues that if the strong physical causal closure argument is correct, the only way to maintain mental causation is to assert type identity reductive physicalism—that mental properties are neurological properties.

== Criticism ==
The validity of the physical causal closure has long been debated. In modern times, it has been pointed out that science is based on removing the subject from investigations, and by seeking objectivity. This outsider status for the observer, a third-person perspective, is said by some philosophers to have automatically severed science from the ability to examine subjective issues like consciousness and free will. A different attack upon the physical causal closure discussed by Hodgson is to claim science itself does not support the physical causal closure. Some philosophers have criticized the argument for the physical causal closure by supporting teleology and mental-to-physical causation via a soul.

=== Ignoring phenomena ===
There seem prima facie to be irreducible purpose-based (or teleological) explanations of some natural phenomena. For instance, the movement of a writer's fingers on the keyboard and a reader's eyes across the screen is irreducibly explained in reference to the goal of writing an intelligible sentence or of learning about the physical causal closure arguments, respectively. On the face of it, an exclusively non-teleological (descriptive) account of the neurological and biological features of hand movement and eye movement misses the point. To say, "I am moving my fingers because my brain signals are triggering muscle motion in my arms" is true, but does not exhaustively explain all the causes. In Aristotelian terms, a neurological account explains the efficient cause, while the purpose-based account explains the final cause.

The physical causal closure thesis challenges this account. It attempts to reduce all teleological final (and formal) causes to efficient causes. Goetz and Taliaferro urge that this challenge is unjustified, partly because it would imply that the real cause of arguing for the physical causal closure is neurobiological activity in the brain, rather than the purpose-based attempt to understand the world and explain it to others.

== See also ==
- Antireductionism
- Epiphenomenalism
- Physical determinism
- Reductionism
