= Psychophysical =

Psychophysical relates to the relationship between one's internal (psychic) and external (physical) worlds.

Psychophysical may refer to:

- Psychophysics, the subdiscipline of psychology dealing with the relationship between physical stimuli and their subjective correlates
- Psychophysiology, the branch of psychology that is concerned with the physiological bases of psychological processes including sensory processes
- Psychophysical parallelism, the theory that the conscious and nervous processes vary concomitantly

== See also ==
- Psychometrics, a related field of study concerned with the theory and technique of psychological measurement
