= Anomalous monism =

Philosophical thesis about the mind–body relationship

Anomalous monism is a philosophical thesis about the mind–body relationship. It was first proposed by Donald Davidson in his 1970 paper "Mental Events". The theory is twofold and states that mental events are identical with physical events, and that the mental is anomalous, i.e. under their mental descriptions, causal relations between these mental events are not describable by strict physical laws. Hence, Davidson proposes an identity theory of mind without the reductive bridge laws associated with the type-identity theory. Since the publication of his paper, Davidson refined his thesis and both critics and supporters of anomalous monism have come up with their own characterizations of the thesis, many of which appear to differ from Davidson's.

== Overview ==
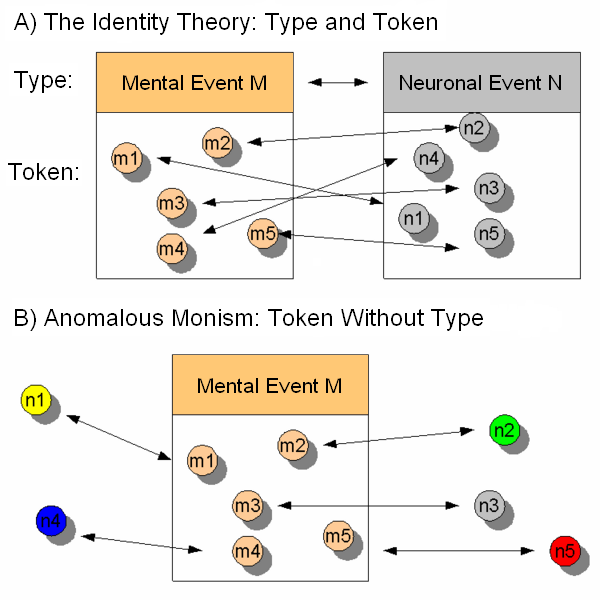
The classic Identity theory and anomalous monism in contrast. For the Identity theory, every token instantiation of a single mental type corresponds (as indicated by the arrows) to a physical token of a single physical type. Hence there is type-identity. For anomalous monism, the token-token correspondences can fall outside of the type-type correspondences. The result is token identity.

Considering views about the relation between the mental and the physical as distinguished first by whether or not mental entities are identical with physical entities, and second by whether or not there are strict psychophysical laws, we arrive at a fourfold classification: (1) nomological monism, which says there are strict correlating laws, and that the correlated entities are identical (this is usually called type physicalism); (2) nomological dualism, which holds that there are strict correlating laws, but that the correlated entities are not identical (parallelism, property dualism and pre-established harmony); (3) anomalous dualism, which holds there are no laws correlating the mental and the physical, that the substances are ontologically distinct, but nevertheless there is interaction between them (i.e. Cartesian dualism); and (4) anomalous monism, which allows only one class of entities, but denies the possibility of definitional and nomological reduction. Davidson put forth his theory of anomalous monism as a possible solution to the mind–body problem.

Since in this theory every mental event is some physical event or other, the idea is that someone's thinking at a certain time, for example, that snow is white, is a certain pattern of neural firing in their brain at that time, an event which can be characterized as both a thinking that snow is white (a type of mental event) and a pattern of neural firing (a type of physical event). There is just one event that can be characterized both in mental terms and in physical terms. If mental events are physical events, they can at least in principle be explained and predicted, like all physical events, on the basis of laws of physical science. However, according to anomalous monism, events cannot be so explained or predicted as described in mental terms (such as "thinking", "desiring", etc.), but only as described in physical terms: this is the distinctive feature of the thesis as a brand of physicalism.

== Davidson's classic argument for AM ==
Davidson's argument for anomalous monism relies on the following three principles:

1. The principle of causal interaction: there exist both mental-to-physical as well as physical-to-mental causal interactions.
2. The principle of the nomological character of causality: all events are causally related through strict laws.
3. The principle of the anomalism of the mental: there are no strict psychophysical or psychological laws that can causally relate mental events with physical events or mental events with other mental events.

== Causal interaction ==
The first principle follows from Davidson's view of the ontology of events and the nature of the relationship of mental events (specifically propositional attitudes) with physical actions. Davidson subscribes to an ontology of events where events (as opposed to objects or states of affairs) are the fundamental, irreducible entities of the mental and physical universe. His original position, as expressed in Actions and Events, was that event-individuation must be done on the basis of causal powers. He later abandoned this view in favour of the individuation of events on the basis of spatio-temporal localization, but his principle of causal interaction seems to imply some sort of, at least, implicit commitment to causal individuation. According to this view, all events are caused by and cause other events and this is the chief, defining characteristic of what an event is.

Another relevant aspect of Davidson's ontology of events for anomalous monism is that an event has an indefinite number of properties or aspects. An event such as "the turning on of the light-switch" is not fully described in the words of that particular phrase. Rather, "the turning on of the light-switch" also involves "the illumination of the room", "the alerting of the burglar in the kitchen", etc... Since a physical event, such as the action of turning on the light-switch can be associated with a very large variety of mental events (reasons) which are potentially capable of rationalizing the action a posteriori, how is it possible to choose the real cause of my turning on the light-switch (which event is the causal one)? Davidson says that the causal event, in such a case, is the particular reason that caused the action to occur. It was because I wanted to see better that I turned on the light-switch and not because I wanted to alert the burglar in the kitchen. The latter is just a sort of side effect. So, for Davidson, "reasons are causes" and this explains the causal efficacy of the mental.

== Nomological character of causality ==
The principle of the nomological character of causality (or cause-law principle) requires that events be covered by so-called strict laws. Davidson originally assumed the validity of this principle but, in more recent years, he felt the need to provide a logical justification for it. So what is a strict law?

=== Strict laws ===
According to Davidson, whenever a particular event E1 is causally related to a second particular event E2, there must be a law such that (C1 & D1) → D2, where C1 represents a set of preliminary conditions, D1 is a description of E1 that, given C1, is sufficient for the occurrence of an event of the kind D2, which represents the description of E2. The cause-law principle was intended by Davidson to include both laws of temporal succession and bridge laws.

Since Davidson denies that any such laws can involve mental predicates (M) (including such laws as (M1 & M2) → M3 where the predicates are all mental or mixed laws such as ((M1 & M2 → P1) and ((P1 & P2 → M1))), where mental predicates interact with physical predicates (P). Consequently, that suggest direct correlations like P1 → M1, M1 → P1 or M1 if and only if P1 are excluded from his framework.

Mental predicates may be allowed in what are termed hedged laws which are strict laws qualified by ceteris paribus (all other things being equal) clauses. This means that while the generalization ((M1 & M2) → P1) is justifiable ceteris paribus, it cannot be fully expanded into a more detailed law such as (P2 & P3 & M1 & M2 & M3) → P1.

=== Justification of cause-law ===
Davidson defended the cause-law principle by revising Curt John Ducasse's (1926) attempt to define singular causal relations without appealing to covering laws. Ducasse's account of cause was based on the notion of change. Some particular event C is the cause of some effect E if and only if C was the only change that occurred in the immediate environment of E just prior to the occurrence of E. So, for example, the striking of a match is the cause of the flaming of the match to the extent that the striking is the only change that occurs in the immediate vicinity of the match.

Davidson turns this around and asks if it is not the case that our notions of change do not, rather, appeal to a foundation of laws. Davidson first observes that 'change' is just shorthand for 'change of predicate', in that a change occurs when and only when a predicate that is true (false) of some object later becomes false (true) of that object. Second, and more importantly, the notion of change has itself changed over time: under Newtonian physics, continuous motion counts as change but not in Aristotelian physics. Hence, it could be argued that what we view as change is theory-dependent and presupposes a background notion of laws. Since change is fundamental to the concept of cause and change is dependent on laws, it follows that cause is also dependent on laws.

== The anomalism of the mental ==
The third principle requires a different justification. It suggests that the mental cannot be linked up with the physical in a chain of psycho-physical laws such that mental events can be predicted and explained on the basis of such laws. This principle arises out of two further doctrines which Davidson espoused throughout his life: the normativity of the mental and semantic holism.

=== Normativity ===
Propositional attitude ascriptions are subject to the constraints of rationality and, so, in ascribing one belief to an individual, I must also ascribe to them all of the beliefs which are logical consequences of that ascription. All of this is in accordance with the principle of charity, according to which we must "try for a theory that finds them consistent, a believer of truths, and a lover of the good" (Davidson 1970). But we can never have all the possible evidence for the ascription of mental states for they are subject to the indeterminacy of translation and there is an enormous amount of subjectivity involved in the process. On the other hand, physical processes are deterministic and descriptive rather than normative. Therefore, their base of evidence is closed and law-governed.

=== Holism ===
Vincenzo Fano provides an illustration of the point that holism of the mental generates anomalism. Fano asks us to first consider the attribution of length to a table. To do this, we must assume a set of laws concerning the interaction between the table and the measuring apparatus: the length of the table doesn't vary significantly during the measurement, length must be an additive quantity, "longer than" must be an asymmetric, transitive relation and so forth. By assuming these laws and carrying out a few operations, we reach the result of the measurement. There is a certain amount of holism in this process. For example, during the measurement process, we might discover that the table is much hotter than the measuring device, in which case the length of the latter will have been modified by the contact. Consequently, we need to modify the temperature of the measuring device. In some cases, we will even have to reconsider and revise some of our laws. This process can continue for some time until we are fairly confident of the results obtained. But it is not only necessary to have a theory of the interactions between the table and the measuring device, it is also necessary to attribute a set of predicates to the table: a certain temperature, rigidity, electric charge, etc... And the attribution of each of these predicates presupposes, in turn, another theory. So, the attribution of F to x presupposes Px and the theory $T_f$, but Px, in turn, presupposes P'x and $T_p$ and so on. As a result, we have a series of predicates F, P, $P'$, $P''$... and a series of theories $T_f$, $T_p$, $T_p'$.... As Fano states it, "this process would seem like a regressus ad infinitum, if it weren't that $T_f + T_p + T_p' + T_p''$ converges toward a theory T which is nothing other than physics in its entirety." The same is true of the predicates, which converge toward the set of all the possible physical quantities. Fano calls this 'convergent holism'.

He asks us to then consider the attribution of a belief. We are seeking a good scientific theory of amorous relations. We ask ourselves if Thomas, who has recently been betrayed by his girlfriend Ffion, believes that it is possible that the relationship can continue. The way we can find out the answer to this question is simply by asking Thomas if he believes it is possible. Thomas says no. Does this authorize us to attribute to Thomas the belief that the relationship cannot continue? Of course not, since Thomas is probably angry and confuses his desire to break up with Ffion with his beliefs. So we ask him if he is angry with Ffion. He says that he is, but we cannot attribute to him the belief that the relationship can continue, because we don't really know if he's confusing his desires with his beliefs or vice versa. So now we ask Thomas if he will still retain the same opinion next month. Thomas pauses for a while and then says yes. At this point, we think we have a definitive confirmation of the fact that Thomas believes that the relation must be interrupted, since he reflected on the matter before answering. Just to be sure, we ask him what came to mind during that interval of reflection. Thomas answers that he thought of all the unhappy incidents that took place between him and Ffion. So we return to our original hypothesis on the basis that Thomas is angry and therefore confuses his desires and his beliefs.

How can all this be formalized? At the beginning, we attributed the predicate "no" to Thomas as a direct response to our question. This is a physical predicate F. We can call the attribution of Thomas' belief that the relationship cannot continue m. From Fx, we cannot deduce mx. On the basis of the hypothesis that a person who is angry is not capable of examining their own opinions clearly, we asked Thomas if he was angry. We ascribed to him the mental predicate m1 and the physical predicate F1 (the answer "yes" to the question whether he is angry). Now, we can deduce m1 (the fact that he is angry) from F1. But from m1 and F1, we can deduce neither m (the fact that Thomas believes the relationship cannot continue) nor not m. So we continue by attributing the next physical predicate F2 (the positive answer to our question whether he will be of the same opinion in one month).

From F2, F1 and m1, we would like to deduce not m. But we weren't sure what Thomas was thinking about during his pause, so we asked him to tell us and, on the basis of this response F3, we deduce m2 (that Thomas confuses his desires with his beliefs). And so on ad infinitum. The conclusion is that the holism of the mental is non-convergent and therefore it is anomalous with respect to the physical.

== Resolving the contradiction ==
So how are the three seemingly irreconcilable principles above resolved? Davidson distinguishes causal relations, which are an extensional matter and not influenced by the way they are described, from law-like relations, which are intensional and dependent on the manner of description. There is no law of nature under which events fall when they are described according to the order in which they appeared on the television news. When the earthquake caused the Church of Santa Maria dalla Chiesa to collapse, there is surely some physical law(s) which explains what happened, but not under the description in terms of the event on Channel 7 at six p.m. causing the events on Channel 8 at six fifteen. In the same way, mental and physical events are causally related but not qua mental events. The mental events have explanatory predicates which are physical as well as predicates which are irreducibly mental. Hence, anomalous monism is a form of predicate dualism which accompanies ontological monism.

Finally, for those who objected that this is not really a form of physicalism because there is no assurance that every mental event will have a physical base, Davidson formulated the thesis of supervenience. Davidson believed that mental properties are dependent on physical properties and there can be no change in higher-level properties without a corresponding change in lower-level properties.

== Arguments against AM and replies ==
Ted Honderich has challenged the thesis of anomalous monism, forcing, in his words, the "inventor of anomalous monism to think again". To understand Honderich's argument, it is helpful to describe the example he uses to illustrate the thesis of AM itself: the event of two pears being put on a scale causes the event of the scale's moving to the two-pound mark. But if we describe the event as "the two French and green things caused the scale to move to the two-pound mark", then while this is true, there is no lawlike relation between the greenness and Frenchness of the pears and the pointers moving to the two-pound mark.

Honderich then points out that what we are really doing when we say that there is "no lawlike relationship between two things under certain descriptions" is taking certain properties and noting that the two things are not in relation in virtue of those particular properties. But this does not mean they are not in lawlike relation in virtue of certain other properties, such as weight in the pears example. On this basis, we can formulate the generalization that Honderich calls 'the Nomological Character of Causally-Relevant Properties'. Then we ask what the causally relevant properties of the mental events which cause physical events are.

Since Davidson believes that mental events are causally efficacious (i.e. he rejects epiphenomenalism), then it must be a mental event as such (mental properties of mental events) which are the causally relevant properties. But if we accept the first two claims of the argument for AM, along with the idea of the causal efficacy of the mental, and the Principle of Causally-Relevant properties, then the result is a denial of anomalous monism because there are indeed psycho-physical lawlike connections. On the other hand, if we wish to retain the principle of the anomalism of the mental then we must reject causal efficacy and embrace epiphenomenalism.

Davidson has responded to such arguments by reformulating anomalous monism and has defended the improved version in Thinking Causes. He points out that the defect in the so-called epiphenominalism problem lies in its confusion of the concept "by virtue of" (or necessary for) with the idea of an event's being responsible for another. Also, Honderich's example of the pears and the scale is jerry rigged in such a way that only a single effect is taken into consideration: the alteration on the scale. But the action of placing pears on a scale can have many different effects; it can attract the attention of a customer, for example. In this case, the causally relevant properties would be precisely the color, shape and other irrelevant properties of the fruit. What is relevant or irrelevant therefore depends, in part, on the context of explanatory interest.

== See also ==
- Biological naturalism
- Neutral monism
