= Type physicalism =

Theory in the philosophy of mind

Type physicalism (also known as reductive materialism, type identity theory, mind–brain identity theory, identity theory of mind, or psychoneural identity theory) is a physicalist theory in the philosophy of mind. It asserts that mental events can be grouped into types, and can then be correlated with types of physical events in the brain. For example, one type of mental event, such as "mental pains" will, presumably, turn out to be describing one type of physical event (like C-fiber firings).

Type physicalism contrasts with token identity physicalism, which argues that mental events are unlikely to have "steady" or categorical biological correlates. These positions make use of the philosophical type–token distinction (e.g., Two persons having the same "type" of car need not mean that they share a "token", a single vehicle). Type physicalism can now be understood to argue that there is an identity between types (any mental type is identical with some physical type), whereas token identity physicalism says that every token mental state/event/property is identical to some brain state/event/property.

There are other ways a physicalist might criticize type physicalism; eliminative materialism and revisionary materialism question whether science is currently using the best categorisations. Proponents of these views argue that in the same way that talk of demonic possession was questioned with scientific advance, categorisations like "pain" may need to be revised.

== Background ==
According to U. T. Place, one of the popularizers of the idea of type-identity in the 1950s and 1960s, the idea of type-identity physicalism originated in the 1930s with the psychologist E. G. Boring and took nearly a quarter of a century to gain acceptance from the philosophical community. Boring, in a book entitled The Physical Dimensions of Consciousness (1933) wrote that:

To the author a perfect correlation is identity. Two events that always occur together at the same time in the same place, without any temporal or spatial differentiation at all, are not two events but the same event. The mind-body correlations as formulated at present, do not admit of spatial correlation, so they reduce to matters of simple correlation in time. The need for identification is no less urgent in this case (p. 16, quoted in Place [unpublished]).

The barrier to the acceptance of any such vision of the mind, according to Place, was that philosophers and logicians had not yet taken a substantial interest in questions of identity and referential identification in general. The dominant epistemology of the logical positivists at that time was phenomenalism, in the guise of the theory of sense-data. Indeed, Boring himself subscribed to the phenomenalist creed, attempting to reconcile it with an identity theory and this resulted in a reductio ad absurdum of the identity theory, since brain states would have turned out, on this analysis, to be identical to colors, shapes, tones and other sensory experiences.

The revival of interest in the work of Gottlob Frege and his ideas of sense and reference on the part of Herbert Feigl and J. J. C. Smart, along with the discrediting of phenomenalism through the influence of the later Wittgenstein and J. L. Austin, led to a more tolerant climate toward physicalistic and realist ideas. Logical behaviorism emerged as a serious contender to take the place of the Cartesian "ghost in the machine" and, although not lasting very long as a dominant position on the mind/body problem, its elimination of the whole realm of internal mental events was strongly influential in the formation and acceptance of the thesis of type identity.

== Versions of type identity theory ==
There were actually subtle but interesting differences between the three most widely credited formulations of the type-identity thesis, those of Place, Feigl and Smart which were published in several articles in the late 1950s. However, all of the versions share the central idea that the mind is identical to something physical.

=== U. T. Place ===
U. T. Place's (1956) notion of the relation of identity was derived from Bertrand Russell's distinction among several types of is statements: the is of identity, the is of equality and the is of composition. Place's version of the relation of identity is more accurately described as a relation of composition. For Place, higher-level mental events are composed out of lower-level physical events and will eventually be analytically reduced to these. So, to the objection that "sensations" do not mean the same thing as "mental processes", Place could simply reply with the example that "lightning" does not mean the same thing as "electrical discharge" since we determine that something is lightning by looking and seeing it, whereas we determine that something is an electrical discharge through experimentation and testing. Nevertheless, "lightning is an electrical discharge" is true since the one is composed of the other.

=== Feigl and Smart ===
For Feigl (1957) and Smart (1959), on the other hand, the identity was to be interpreted as the identity between the referents of two descriptions (senses) which referred to the same thing, as in "the morning star" and "the evening star" both referring to Venus, a necessary identity. So to the objection about the lack of equality of meaning between "sensation" and "brain process", their response was to invoke this Fregean distinction: "sensations" and "brain" processes do indeed mean different things but they refer to the same physical phenomenon. Moreover, "sensations are brain processes" is a contingent, not a necessary, identity.

== Criticism and replies ==
=== Multiple realizability ===
One of the most influential and common objections to the type identity theory is the argument from multiple realizability. The multiple realizability thesis asserts that mental states can be realized in multiple kinds of systems, not just brains. Since the identity theory identifies mental events with certain brain states, it does not allow for mental states to be realized in organisms or computational systems that do not have a brain. This is in effect an argument that the identity theory is too narrow because it does not allow for organisms without brains to have mental states. However, token identity (where only particular tokens of mental states are identical with particular tokens of physical events) and functionalism both account for multiple realizability.

The response of type identity theorists, such as Smart, to this objection is that, while it may be true that mental events are multiply realizable, this does not demonstrate the falsity of type identity. As Smart states:

"The functionalist second order [causal] state is a state of having some first order state or other which causes or is caused by the behavior to which the functionalist alludes. In this way we have a second order type theory".

The fundamental point is that it is extremely difficult to determine where, on the continuum of first order processes, type identity ends and merely token identities begin. Take Quine's example of English country gardens. In such gardens, the tops of hedges are cut into various shapes, for example the shape of an elf. We can make generalizations over the type elf-shaped hedge only if we abstract away from the concrete details of the individual twigs and branches of each hedge. So, whether we say that two things are of the same type or are tokens of the same type because of subtle differences is just a matter of descriptive abstraction. The type-token distinction is not all or nothing.

Hilary Putnam essentially rejects functionalism because, he believes, it is indeed a second-order type identity theory. Putnam uses multiple realizability against functionalism itself, suggesting that mental events (or kinds, in Putnam's terminology) may be diversely implemented by diverse functional/computational kinds; there may be only a token identification between particular mental kinds and particular functional kinds. Putnam, and many others who have followed him, now tend to identify themselves as generically non-reductive physicalists. Putnam's invocation of multiple realizability does not, of course, directly answer the problem raised by Smart with respect to useful generalizations over types and the flexible nature of the type-token distinction in relation to causal taxonomies in science.

=== Qualia ===
Another frequent objection is that type identity theories fail to account for phenomenal mental states (or qualia), such as having a pain, feeling sad, experiencing nausea. (Qualia are merely the subjective qualities of conscious experience. An example is the way the pain of jarring one's elbow feels to the individual.) Arguments can be found in Saul Kripke and David Chalmers, for example, according to which the identity theorist cannot identify phenomenal mental states with brain states (or any other physical state for that matter) because one has a sort of direct awareness of the nature of such qualitative mental states, and their nature is qualitative in a way that brain states are not. A famous formulation of the qualia objection comes from Frank Jackson in the form of the Mary's room thought experiment. Let us suppose, Jackson suggests, that a particularly brilliant super-scientist named Mary has been locked away in a completely black-and-white room her entire life. Over the years in her colour-deprived world she has studied (via black-and-white books and television) the sciences of neurophysiology, vision and electromagnetics to their fullest extent; eventually Mary learns all the physical facts there are to know about experiencing colour. When Mary is released from her room and experiences colour for the first time, does she learn something new? If we answer "yes" (as Jackson suggests we do) to this question, then we have supposedly denied the truth of type physicalism, for if Mary has exhausted all the physical facts about experiencing colour prior to her release, then her subsequently acquiring some new piece of information about colour upon experiencing its quale reveals that there must be something about the experience of colour which is not captured by the physicalist picture.

The type identity theorist, such as Smart, attempts to explain away such phenomena by insisting that the experiential properties of mental events are topic-neutral. The concept of topic-neutral terms and expressions goes back to Gilbert Ryle, who identified such topic-neutral terms as "if", "or", "not", "because" and "and." If one were to hear these terms alone in the course of a conversation, it would be impossible to tell whether the topic under discussion concerned geology, physics, history, gardening, or selling pizza. For the identity theorist, sense-data and qualia are not real things in the brain (or the physical world in general) but are more like "the average electrician." The average electrician can be further analyzed and explained in terms of real electricians but is not itself a real electrician.

=== Other ===
Type physicalism has also been criticized from an illusionist perspective. Keith Frankish writes that it is "an unstable position, continually on the verge of collapsing into illusionism. The central problem, of course, is that phenomenal properties seem too weird to yield to physical explanation. They resist functional analysis and float free of whatever physical mechanisms are posited to explain them". He proposes instead that phenomenality is an illusion, arguing that it is therefore the illusion rather than phenomenal consciousness itself that requires explanation.

== See also ==
- Consciousness
- Biological naturalism
- Emergent materialism
- Materialism
- Mind–body problem
- Monism
- Philosophy of mind
- Physicalism
- Presentism

== References and further reading ==
- Chalmers, David (1996). The Conscious Mind, Oxford University Press, New York.
- Feigl, Herbert (1958). "The 'Mental' and the 'Physical'" in Feigl, H., Scriven, M. and Maxwell, G. (eds.). Concepts, Theories and the Mind-Body Problem, Minneapolis, Minnesota Studies in the Philosophy of Science, Vol. 2, reprinted with a Postscript in Feigl 1967.
- Feigl, Herbert (1967). The 'Mental' and the 'Physical', The Essay and a Postscript, Minneapolis, University of Minnesota Press.
- Jackson, Frank (1982) "Epiphenomenal Qualia", Philosophical Quarterly 32, pp. 127–136.
- Kripke, Saul (1972/1980). Naming and Necessity, Cambridge, Mass., Harvard University Press. (Originally published in 1972 as "Naming and Necessity".)
- Lewis, David (1966). "An Argument for the Identity Theory", Journal of Philosophy, 63, pp. 17–25.
- Lewis, David (1980). "Mad Pain and Martian Pain" in Readings in the Philosophy of Psychology, Vol. I, N. Block (ed.), Harvard University Press, pp. 216–222. (Also in Lewis's Philosophical Papers, Vol. 1, Oxford University Press, 1983.)
- Morris, Kevin (2019). Physicalism Deconstructed: Levels of Reality and the Mind–Body Problem, Cambridge University Press, Cambridge.
- Place, U. T. (1956). "Is Consciousness a Brain Process?", British Journal of Psychology, 47, pp. 44–50.
- Place, U. T. (unpublished). "Identity Theories", A Field Guide to the Philosophy of Mind. Società italiana per la filosofia analitica, Marco Nani (ed.). (link)
- Putnam, Hilary (1988). Representation and Reality. The MIT Press.
- Smart, J. J. C. (1959). "Sensations and Brain Processes", Philosophical Review, 68, pp. 141–156.
- Smart, J. J. C. (2004). "The Identity Theory of Mind", The Stanford Encyclopedia of Philosophy (Fall 2004 Edition), Edward N. Zalta (ed.). (link)
