= Double-aspect theory =

Theory in the philosophy of mind

In the philosophy of mind, double-aspect theory is the view that the mental and the physical are two aspects of, or perspectives on, the same substance. It is also called dual-aspect monism, not to be confused with mind–body dualism. The theory's relationship to neutral monism is ill-defined,

Neutral monism and the dual-aspect theory share a central claim: there is an underlying reality that is neither mental nor physical. But that is where the agreement stops. Neutral monism has no room for the central feature of the dual-aspect theory: the mental and physical aspects, sides, or properties that characterize the underlying entities of dual-aspect theory. The neutral monist accepts the mental/physical distinction.

According to Harald Atmanspacher, "dual-aspect approaches consider the mental and physical domains of reality as aspects, or manifestations, of an underlying undivided reality in which the mental and the physical do not exist as separate domains. In such a framework, the distinction between mind and matter results from an epistemic split that separates the aspects of the underlying reality. Consequently, the status of the psychophysically neutral domain is considered as ontic relative to the mind–matter distinction".

== Theories ==
Dual-aspect theory is akin to neutral monism. This diagram contrasts it with physicalism and idealism, as well as Cartesian dualism.

Possible double-aspect theorists include:

- Baruch Spinoza, who believed that Nature or God (Deus sive Natura) has infinite aspects, but that Extension and Mind are the only aspects of which we have knowledge.
- Arthur Schopenhauer, who considered the fundamental aspects of reality to be will and representation.
- David Bohm, who used implicate and explicate order as a means of displaying dual-aspects.
- Gustav Fechner
- Mark Solms, neuropsychoanalyst, for whom dual-aspect monism represents a matrix of ontological juxtaposition of psychoanalytical and neuroscientific knowledge from two distinct perspectives: looking from the inside and looking from the outside.
- George Henry Lewes
- Thomas Jay Oord – he calls his version "material-mental monism"
- John Polkinghorne
- Brian O'Shaughnessy on the dual aspect theory of the will
- Thomas Nagel
- David Chalmers, who explores a double-aspect view of information, with similarities to Kenneth Sayre's information-based neutral monism
- J. A. Scott Kelso, The Complementary Nature (MIT Press, 2006) attempts to reconcile what it calls "the philosophy of complementary pairs" with the science of coordination dynamics.

=== Pauli–Jung conjecture ===
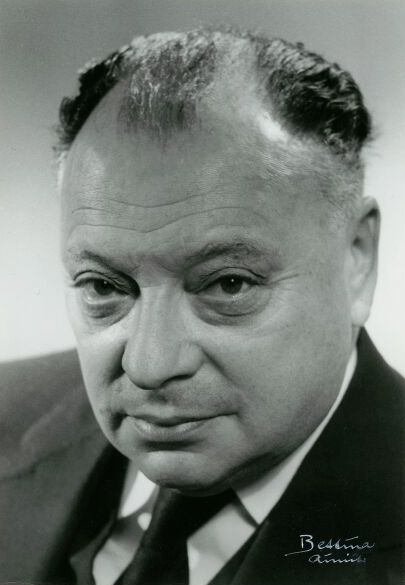
Wolfgang Pauli

The Pauli–Jung conjecture is a collaboration in metatheory between physicist Wolfgang Pauli and analytical psychologist Carl Jung, centered on the concept of synchronicity. It was mainly developed between 1946 and 1954, four years before Pauli's death, and speculates on a double-aspect perspective within the disciplines of both collaborators. Pauli additionally drew on various elements of quantum theory such as complementarity, nonlocality, and the observer effect in his contributions to the project. Jung and Pauli thereby "offered the radical [...] idea that the currency of these correlations is not (quantitative) statistics, as in quantum physics, but (qualitative) meaning".

Contemporary physicist T. Filk writes that quantum entanglement, being "a particular type of acausal quantum correlations", was plausibly taken by Pauli as "a model for the relationship between mind and matter in the framework [...] he proposed together with Jung". Specifically, quantum entanglement may be the physical phenomenon which most closely represents the concept of synchronicity.

Pauli and Jung's approach to dual-aspect monism has a very specific further feature, namely that different aspects may show a complementarity in a quantum physical sense. That is, the Pauli–Jung conjecture implies that with regard to mental and physical states there may be incompatible descriptions of different parts that emerge from the whole. This stands in close analogy to quantum physics, where complementary properties cannot be determined jointly with accuracy.

Atmanspacher further refers to Paul Bernays' views on complementarity in physics and in philosophy when he states that "Two descriptions are complementary if they mutually exclude each other, yet are both necessary to describe a situation exhaustively."

== See also ==
- Anomalous monism
- Neutral monism
- Property dualism
- Samkhya darsana
