= Mind–body problem =

Open question in philosophy of how abstract minds interact with physical bodies

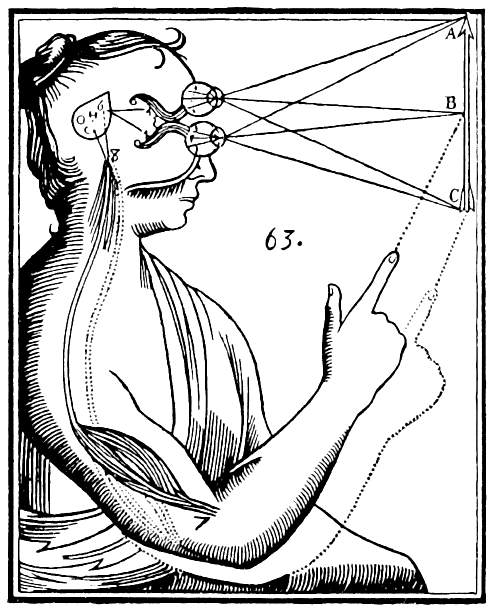
Illustration of mind–body dualism by René Descartes. Inputs are passed by the sensory organs to the pineal gland, and from there to the immaterial spirit.

In philosophy of mind, the mind–body problem is a philosophical problem concerning the relationship between thought and consciousness in the human mind and body. It addresses the nature of consciousness, mental states, and their relation to the physical brain and nervous system. The problem centers on understanding how immaterial thoughts and feelings can interact with the material world, or whether they are ultimately physical phenomena.

This problem has been a central issue in philosophy of mind since the 17th century, particularly following René Descartes' formulation of dualism, which proposes that mind and body are fundamentally distinct substances. Other major philosophical positions include monism, which encompasses physicalism (everything is ultimately physical) and idealism (everything is ultimately mental). More recent approaches include functionalism, property dualism, and various non-reductive theories.

The mind-body problem raises fundamental questions about causation between mental and physical events, the nature of consciousness, personal identity, and free will. It remains significant in both philosophy and science, influencing fields such as cognitive science, neuroscience, psychology, and artificial intelligence.

In general, the existence of these mind–body connections seems unproblematic. Issues arise, however, when attempting to interpret these relations from a metaphysical or scientific perspective. Such reflections raise a number of questions, including:

- Are the mind and body two distinct entities, or a single entity?
- If the mind and body are two distinct entities, do the two of them causally interact?
- Is it possible for these two distinct entities to causally interact?
- What is the nature of this interaction?
- Can this interaction ever be an object of empirical study?
- If the mind and body are a single entity, then are mental events explicable in terms of physical events, or vice versa?
- Is the relation between mental and physical events something that arises de novo at a certain point in development?

These and other questions that discuss the relation between mind and body are questions that all fall under the banner of the 'mind–body problem'.

== Mind–body interaction and mental causation ==
Philosophers David L. Robb and John F. Heil introduce mental causation in terms of the mind–body problem of interaction:

Mind–body interaction has a central place in our pretheoretic conception of agency. Indeed, mental causation often figures explicitly in formulations of the mind–body problem. Some philosophers insist that the very notion of psychological explanation turns on the intelligibility of mental causation. If your mind and its states, such as your beliefs and desires, were causally isolated from your bodily behavior, then what goes on in your mind could not explain what you do. If psychological explanation goes, so do the closely related notions of agency and moral responsibility. Clearly, a good deal rides on a satisfactory solution to the problem of mental causation [and] there is more than one way in which puzzles about the mind's "causal relevance" to behavior (and to the physical world more generally) can arise.

[René Descartes] set the agenda for subsequent discussions of the mind–body relation. According to Descartes, minds and bodies are distinct kinds of "substance". Bodies, he held, are spatially extended substances, incapable of feeling or thought; minds, in contrast, are unextended, thinking, feeling substances. If minds and bodies are radically different kinds of substance, however, it is not easy to see how they "could" causally interact. Princess Elizabeth of Bohemia puts it forcefully to him in a 1643 letter:

how the human soul can determine the movement of the animal spirits in the body so as to perform voluntary acts—being as it is merely a conscious substance. For the determination of movement seems always to come about from the moving body's being propelled—to depend on the kind of impulse it gets from what sets it in motion, or again, on the nature and shape of this latter thing's surface. Now the first two conditions involve contact, and the third involves that the impelling thing has extension; but you utterly exclude extension from your notion of soul, and contact seems to me incompatible with a thing's being immaterial...

Elizabeth is expressing the prevailing mechanistic view as to how causation of bodies works. Causal relations countenanced by contemporary physics can take several forms, not all of which are of the push–pull variety.

— David Robb and John Heil, "Mental Causation" in The Stanford Encyclopedia of Philosophy

Contemporary neurophilosopher Georg Northoff suggests that mental causation is compatible with classical formal and final causality.

Biologist, theoretical neuroscientist and philosopher, Walter J. Freeman, suggests that explaining mind–body interaction in terms of "circular causation" is more relevant than linear causation.

In neuroscience, much has been learned about correlations between brain activity and subjective conscious experiences. Many suggest that neuroscience will ultimately explain consciousness: "...consciousness is a biological process that will eventually be explained in terms of molecular signaling pathways used by interacting populations of nerve cells..." However, this view has been criticized because consciousness has yet to be shown to be a process, and the "hard problem" of relating consciousness directly to brain activity remains elusive.

Cognitive science today gets increasingly interested in the embodiment of human perception, thinking, and action. Abstract information processing models are no longer accepted as satisfactory accounts of the human mind. Interest has shifted to interactions between the material human body and its surroundings and to the way in which such interactions shape the mind. Proponents of this approach have expressed the hope that it will ultimately dissolve the Cartesian divide between the immaterial mind and the material existence of human beings (Damasio, 1994; Gallagher, 2005). A topic that seems particularly promising for providing a bridge across the mind–body cleavage is the study of bodily actions, which are neither reflexive reactions to external stimuli nor indications of mental states, which have only arbitrary relationships to the motor features of the action (e.g., pressing a button for making a choice response). The shape, timing, and effects of such actions are inseparable from their meaning. One might say that they are loaded with mental content, which cannot be appreciated other than by studying their material features. Imitation, communicative gesturing, and tool use are examples of these kinds of actions.

— Georg Goldenberg, "How the Mind Moves the Body: Lessons From Apraxia" in Oxford Handbook of Human Action

Since 1927, at the Solvay Conference in Austria, European physicists of the late 19th and early 20th centuries realized that the interpretations of their experiments with light and electricity required a different theory to explain why light behaves both as a wave and particle. The implications were profound. The usual empirical model of explaining natural phenomena could not account for this duality of matter and non-matter. In a significant way, this has brought back the conversation on the mind–body duality.

Another way of investigating the mind–body problem is to distinguish between first-person subjective experience (understood as a dynamic flow of constantly changing sensory experiences and mental events spanning the present moment, the past, and the future) and third-person accounts of phenomena in the world, including the body, the brain, and other observable entities. This understanding links to the realization that understanding the mind and understanding material phenomena (including the body and the brain), represent contrasting but equally valid epistemological frameworks.

== Neural correlates ==
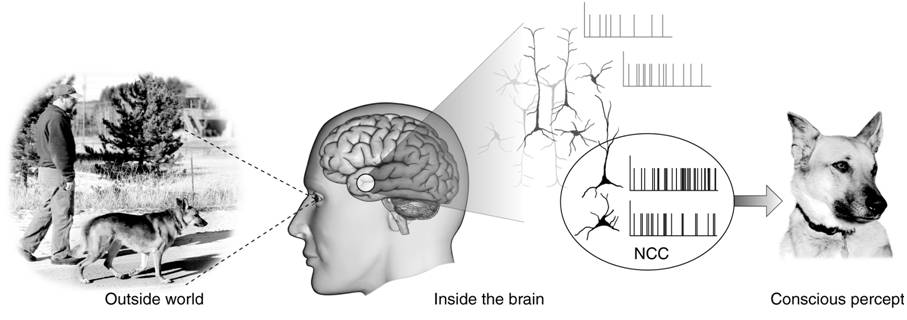
The neuronal correlates of consciousness constitute the smallest set of neural events and structures sufficient for a given conscious percept or explicit memory. This case involves synchronized action potentials in neocortical pyramidal neurons.

The neural correlates of consciousness "are the smallest set of brain mechanisms and events sufficient for some specific conscious feeling, as elemental as the color red or as complex as the sensual, mysterious, and primeval sensation evoked when looking at [a] jungle scene..." Neuroscientists use empirical approaches to discover neural correlates of subjective phenomena.

=== Neurobiology and neurophilosophy ===
A science of consciousness must explain the exact relationship between subjective conscious mental states and brain states formed by electrochemical interactions in the body, the so-called hard problem of consciousness. Neurobiology studies the connection scientifically, as do neuropsychology and neuropsychiatry. Neurophilosophy is the interdisciplinary study of neuroscience and philosophy of mind. In this pursuit, neurophilosophers, such as Patricia Churchland, Paul Churchland and Daniel Dennett, have focused primarily on the body rather than the mind. In this context, neuronal correlates may be viewed as causing consciousness, where consciousness can be thought of as an undefined property that depends upon this complex, adaptive, and highly interconnected biological system. However, it's unknown if discovering and characterizing neural correlates may eventually provide a theory of consciousness that can explain the first-person experience of these "systems", and determine whether other systems of equal complexity lack such features.

The massive parallelism of neural networks allows redundant populations of neurons to mediate the same or similar percepts. Nonetheless, it is assumed that every subjective state will have associated neural correlates, which can be manipulated to artificially inhibit or induce the subject's experience of that conscious state. The growing ability of neuroscientists to manipulate neurons using methods from molecular biology in combination with optical tools was achieved by the development of behavioral and organic models that are amenable to large-scale genomic analysis and manipulation. Non-human analysis such as this, in combination with imaging of the human brain, have contributed to a robust and increasingly predictive theoretical framework.

=== Arousal and content ===
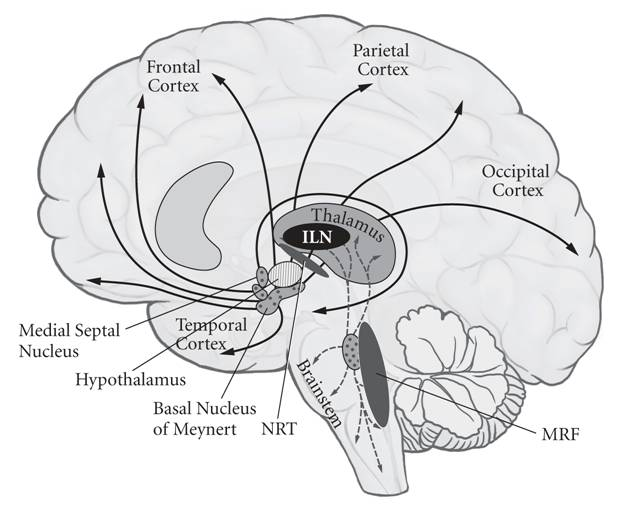
Midline structures in the brainstem and thalamus necessary to regulate the level of brain arousal. Small, bilateral lesions in many of these nuclei cause a global loss of consciousness.

There are two common but distinct dimensions of the term consciousness, one involving arousal and states of consciousness and the other involving content of consciousness and conscious states. To be conscious of something, the brain must be in a relatively high state of arousal (sometimes called vigilance), whether awake or in REM sleep. Brain arousal level fluctuates in a circadian rhythm but these natural cycles may be influenced by lack of sleep, alcohol and other drugs, physical exertion, etc. Arousal can be measured behaviorally by the signal amplitude required to trigger a given reaction (for example, the sound level that causes a subject to turn and look toward the source). High arousal states involve conscious states that feature specific perceptual content, planning and recollection or even fantasy. Clinicians use scoring systems such as the Glasgow Coma Scale to assess the level of arousal in patients with impaired states of consciousness such as the comatose state, the persistent vegetative state, and the minimally conscious state. Here, "state" refers to different amounts of externalized, physical consciousness: ranging from a total absence in coma, persistent vegetative state and general anesthesia, to a fluctuating, minimally conscious state, such as sleep walking and epileptic seizure.

Many nuclei with distinct chemical signatures in the thalamus, midbrain and pons must function for a subject to be in a sufficient state of brain arousal to experience anything at all. These nuclei therefore belong to the enabling factors for consciousness. Conversely it is likely that the specific content of any particular conscious sensation is mediated by particular neurons in the cortex and their associated satellite structures, including the amygdala, thalamus, claustrum and the basal ganglia.

== Theoretical frameworks ==
Different approaches toward resolving the mind–body problem

A variety of approaches have been proposed. Most are either dualist or monist. Dualism maintains a rigid distinction between the realms of mind and matter. Monism maintains that there is only one unifying reality as in neutral or substance or essence, in terms of which everything can be explained.

Each of these categories contains numerous variants. The two main forms of dualism are substance dualism, which holds that the mind is formed of a distinct type of substance not governed by the laws of physics, and property dualism, which holds that mental properties involving conscious experience are fundamental properties, alongside the fundamental properties identified by a completed physics. The three main forms of monism are physicalism, which holds that the mind consists of matter organized in a particular way; idealism, which holds that only thought truly exists and matter is merely a representation of mental processes; and neutral monism, which holds that both mind and matter are aspects of a distinct essence that is itself identical to neither of them. Psychophysical parallelism is a third possible alternative regarding the relation between mind and body, between interaction (dualism) and one-sided action (monism).

Several philosophical perspectives that have sought to escape the problem by rejecting the mind–body dichotomy have been developed. The historical materialism of Karl Marx and subsequent writers, itself a form of physicalism, held that consciousness was engendered by the material contingencies of one's environment. An explicit rejection of the dichotomy is found in French structuralism, and is a position that generally characterized post-war Continental philosophy.

An ancient model of the mind known as the Five-Aggregate Model, described in the Buddhist teachings, explains the mind as continuously changing sense impressions and mental phenomena. Considering this model, it is possible to understand that it is the constantly changing sense impressions and mental phenomena (i.e., the mind) that experience/analyze all external phenomena in the world as well as all internal phenomena including the body anatomy, the nervous system as well as the organ brain. This conceptualization leads to two levels of analyses: (i) analyses conducted from a third-person perspective on how the brain works, and (ii) analyzing the moment-to-moment manifestation of an individual's mind-stream (analyses conducted from a first-person perspective). Considering the latter, the manifestation of the mind-stream is described as happening in every person all the time, even in a scientist who analyzes various phenomena in the world, including analyzing and hypothesizing about the organ brain.

Christian List argues that Benj Hellie's vertiginous question, i.e. why an individual exists as themselves and not as someone else, and the existence of first-personal facts, is evidence against physicalism. However, according to List, this is also evidence against other third-personal metaphysical pictures, including standard versions of dualism. List also argues that the vertiginous question implies a "quadrilemma" for theories of consciousness. He claims that at most three of the following metaphysical claims can be true: 'first-person realism', 'non-solipsism', 'non-fragmentation', and 'one world' – and thus one of these four must be rejected. List has proposed a model he calls the "many-worlds theory of consciousness" in order to reconcile the subjective nature of consciousness without lapsing into solipsism.

=== Dualism ===
The following is a very brief account of some contributions to the mind–body problem.

==== Interactionism ====
The viewpoint of interactionism suggests that the mind and body are two separate substances, but that each can affect the other. This interaction between the mind and body was first put forward by the philosopher René Descartes. Descartes believed that the mind was non-physical and permeated the entire body, but that the mind and body interacted via the pineal gland. This theory has changed throughout the years, and in the 20th century its main adherents were the philosopher of science Karl Popper and the neurophysiologist John Carew Eccles. A more recent and popular version of Interactionism is the viewpoint of emergentism. This perspective states that mental states are a result of the brain states, and that the mental events can then influence the brain, resulting in a two way communication between the mind and body.

The absence of an empirically identifiable meeting point between the non-physical mind (if there is such a thing) and its physical extension (if there is such a thing) has been raised as a criticism of interactionalist dualism. This criticism has led many modern philosophers of mind to maintain that the mind is not something separate from the body. These approaches have been particularly influential in the sciences, particularly in the fields of sociobiology, computer science, evolutionary psychology, and the neurosciences.

Avshalom Elitzur has defended interactionism and has described himself as a "reluctant dualist". One argument Elitzur makes in favor of dualism is an argument from bafflement. According to Elitzur, a conscious being can conceive of a P-zombie version of his/herself. However, a P-zombie cannot conceive of a version of itself that lacks corresponding qualia.

==== Epiphenomenalism ====
A possible consequence of certain physicalist theories is epiphenomenalism. According to epiphenomenalism, mental events are causally dependent upon physical events, typically neural processes in the brain, but mental events themselves possess no causal efficacy with regard to physical processes. Thus, the experience of pain may be caused by neural activity, yet the subjective feeling of pain, strictly speaking, does not itself influence subsequent bodily events.

Non-reductionist physicalists attempt to avoid this seemingly counterintuitive conclusion by appealing to emergence. According to this perspective, once sufficiently complex brain activity gives rise to mental phenomena, these phenomena may exhibit so-called emergent properties, that is, properties that cannot be straightforwardly reduced to descriptions of neural firing patterns or other lower-level physical processes, even though they remain entirely dependent upon them.

This position, which may be considered the current standard (i.e. the overall most prevalent) position amongst most scientists and naturalistic philosophers, combines substance monism with a form of property dualism. It leaves conceptual room for phenomena such as free will, intentionality, and qualia, while at the same time remaining broadly committed to a naturalistic or materialist worldview. Critics, however, have argued that sufficiently strong versions of emergentism ultimately tend toward some variant of dualism, as genuinely novel causal powers appear difficult to reconcile with an exclusively physical ontology.

This viewpoint explains that while one's body may react to them feeling joy, fear, or sadness, that the emotion does not cause the physical response. Rather, it explains that joy, fear, sadness, and all bodily reactions are caused by chemicals and their interaction with the body.

==== Mind-brain identity theory ====
The Mind-Brain-Identity theory is a reductionist physicalist position, according to which mental states and brain states are not merely correlated but literally identical. There is no explanatory gap to bridge and no additional mystery to solve. The experience of pain, for example, is not simply associated with a particular neural process; it is that neural process, viewed from a different descriptive perspective.

Identity theory generally leaves little room for irreducible non-physical properties such as qualia and is typically compatible only with relatively weak notions of emergence, in the proverbial sense that the whole may exhibit patterns not immediately obvious from its constituent parts.

Nevertheless, since it appears difficult to deny the existence of subjective conscious experience altogether, some identity theorists have proposed that introspective awareness may be understood as a kind of neural self-monitoring, or, metaphorically speaking, as a form of proprioception of the brain by the brain itself. Precisely how such higher-order awareness emerges remains a topic of ongoing debate.

==== Psychophysical parallelism ====
The viewpoint of psychophysical parallelism suggests that the mind and body are entirely independent from one another. Furthermore, this viewpoint states that both mental and physical stimuli and reactions are experienced simultaneously by both the mind and body, however, there is no interaction nor communication between the two.

===== Double aspectism =====
Double aspectism is an extension of psychophysical parallelism which also suggests that the mind and body cannot interact, nor can they be separated. Baruch Spinoza and Gustav Fechner were two of the notable users of double aspectism, however, Fechner later expanded upon it to form the branch of psychophysics in an attempt to prove the relationship of the mind and body.

===== Pre-established harmony =====
The viewpoint of pre-established harmony is another offshoot of psychophysical parallelism which suggests that mental events and bodily events are separate and distinct, but that they are both coordinated by an external agent: an example of such an agent could be God. A notable adherent to the idea of pre-established harmony is Gottfried Wilhelm von Leibniz in his theory of Monadology. His explanation of pre-established harmony relied heavily upon God as the external agent who coordinated the mental and bodily events of all things in the beginning.

Gottfried Wilhelm Leibniz's theory of pre-established harmony (French: harmonie préétablie) is a philosophical theory about causation under which every "substance" affects only itself, but all the substances (both bodies and minds) in the world nevertheless seem to causally interact with each other because they have been programmed by God in advance to "harmonize" with each other. Leibniz's term for these substances was "monads", which he described in a popular work (Monadology §7) as "windowless".

The concept of pre-established harmony can be understood by considering an event with both seemingly mental and physical aspects. For example, consider saying 'ouch' after stubbing one's toe. There are two general ways to describe this event: in terms of mental events (where the conscious sensation of pain caused one to say 'ouch') and in terms of physical events (where neural firings in one's toe, carried to the brain, are what caused one to say 'ouch'). The main task of the mind–body problem is figuring out how these mental events (the feeling of pain) and physical events (the nerve firings) relate. Leibniz's pre-established harmony attempts to answer this puzzle, by saying that mental and physical events are not genuinely related in any causal sense, but only seem to interact due to psycho-physical fine-tuning.

Leibniz's theory is best known as a solution to the mind–body problem of how mind can interact with the body. Leibniz rejected the idea of physical bodies affecting each other, and explained all physical causation in this way.

Under pre-established harmony, the preprogramming of each mind must be extremely complex, since only it causes its own thoughts or actions, for as long as it exists. To appear to interact, each substance's "program" must contain a description of either the entire universe, or of how the object behaves at all times during all interactions that appear to occur.

An example:

An apple falls on Alice's head, apparently causing the experience of pain in her mind. In fact, the apple does not cause the pain—the pain is caused by some previous state of Alice's mind. If Alice then seems to shake her hand in anger, it is not actually her mind that causes this, but some previous state of her hand.

Note that if a mind behaves as a windowless monad, there is no need for any other object to exist to create that mind's sense perceptions, leading to a solipsistic universe that consists only of that mind. Leibniz seems to admit this in his Discourse on Metaphysics, section 14. However, he claims that his principle of harmony, according to which God creates the best and most harmonious world possible, dictates that the perceptions (internal states) of each monad "expresses" the world in its entirety, and the world expressed by the monad actually exists. Although Leibniz says that each monad is "windowless", he also claims that it functions as a "mirror" of the entire created universe.

On occasion, Leibniz styled himself as "the author of the system of pre-established harmony".

Immanuel Kant's professor Martin Knutzen regarded pre-established harmony as "the pillow for the lazy mind".

In his sixth Metaphysical Meditation, Descartes talked about a "coordinated disposition of created things set up by God", shortly after having identified "nature in its general aspect" with God himself. His conception of the relationship between God and his normative nature actualized in the existing world recalls both the pre-established harmony of Leibniz and the Deus sive Natura of Baruch Spinoza.

===== Occasionalism =====
The viewpoint of Occasionalism is another offshoot of psychophysical parallelism, however, the major difference is that the mind and body have some indirect interaction. Occasionalism suggests that the mind and body are separate and distinct, but that they interact through divine intervention. Nicolas Malebranche was one of the main contributors to this idea, using it as a way to address his disagreements with Descartes' view of the mind–body problem. In Malebranche's occasionalism, he viewed thoughts as a wish for the body to move, which was then fulfilled by God causing the body to act.

==== A distinction between first- and third-person perspectives ====
Conceptually separating the first-person perspective from third-person understandings of phenomena in the world provides insight into distinguishing the mind from material phenomena (including the body, the brain, and other observable entities). From the first-person perspective, the mind can be conceptualized as a distinct and dynamic phenomenon consisting of constantly changing sensory encounters and mental processes involving the present moment, the past, and the future. In contrast, third-person scientific analysis relies on communication between individuals and the establishment of intersubjective agreement through shared observation and interpretation of material phenomena. While these two approaches to understanding reflect contrasting epistemological frameworks, insights derived from the first-person perspective foster self-knowledge and wisdom, whereas those arising from the third-person perspective illuminate the workings of the world.

== Historical background ==
The problem was popularized by René Descartes in the 17th century, which resulted in Cartesian dualism, also by pre-Aristotelian philosophers, in Avicennian philosophy, and in earlier Asian traditions.

=== The Buddha ===
The Buddha (480–400 B.C.E), founder of Buddhism, described the mind and the body as depending on each other in a way that two sheaves of reeds were to stand leaning against one another and taught that the world consists of mind and matter which work together, interdependently. Buddhist teachings describe the mind as manifesting from moment to moment, one thought moment at a time as a fast flowing stream. The components that make up the mind are known as the five aggregates (i.e., material form, feelings, perception, volition, and sensory consciousness), which arise and pass away continuously. The arising and passing of these aggregates in the present moment is described as being influenced by five causal laws: biological laws, psychological laws, physical laws, volitional laws, and universal laws. The Buddhist practice of mindfulness involves attending to this constantly changing mind-stream.

Ultimately, the Buddha's philosophy is that both mind and forms are conditionally arising qualities of an ever-changing universe in which, when nirvāna is attained, all phenomenal experience ceases to exist. According to the anattā doctrine of the Buddha, the conceptual self is a mere mental construct of an individual entity and is basically an impermanent illusion, sustained by form, sensation, perception, thought and consciousness. The Buddha argued that mentally clinging to any views will result in delusion and stress, since, according to the Buddha, a real self (conceptual self, being the basis of standpoints and views) cannot be found when the mind has clarity.

=== Plato ===
Plato (429–347 B.C.E.) believed that the material world is a shadow of a higher reality that consists of concepts he called Forms. According to Plato, objects in our everyday world "participate in" these Forms, which confer identity and meaning to material objects. For example, a circle drawn in the sand would be a circle only because it participates in the concept of an ideal circle that exists somewhere in the world of Forms. He argued that, as the body is from the material world, the soul is from the world of Forms and is thus immortal. He believed the soul was temporarily united with the body and would only be separated at death, when it, if pure, would return to the world of Forms; otherwise, reincarnation follows. Since the soul does not exist in time and space, as the body does, it can access universal truths. For Plato, ideas (or Forms) are the true reality, and are experienced by the soul. The body is for Plato empty in that it cannot access the abstract reality of the world; it can only experience shadows. This is determined by Plato's essentially rationalistic epistemology.

=== Aristotle ===
For Aristotle (384–322 BC) mind is a faculty of the soul. Regarding the soul, he said:

It is not necessary to ask whether soul and body are one, just as it is not necessary to ask whether the wax and its shape are one, nor generally whether the matter of each thing and that of which it is the matter are one. For even if one and being are spoken of in several ways, what is properly so spoken of is the actuality.

— De Anima ii 1, 412b6–9

In the end, Aristotle saw the relation between soul and body as uncomplicated, in the same way that it is uncomplicated that a cubical shape is a property of a toy building block. The soul is a property exhibited by the body, one among many. Moreover, Aristotle proposed that when the body perishes, so does the soul, just as the shape of a building block disappears with destruction of the block.

==== Medieval Aristotelianism ====
Working in the Aristotelian-influenced tradition of Thomism, Thomas Aquinas (1225–1274), like Aristotle, believed that the mind and the body are one, like a seal and wax; therefore, it is pointless to ask whether or not they are one. However, (referring to "mind" as "the soul") he asserted that the soul persists after the death of the body in spite of their unity, calling the soul "this particular thing". Since his view was primarily theological rather than philosophical, it is impossible to fit it neatly within either the category of physicalism or dualism.

=== Influences of Eastern monotheistic religions ===
In religious philosophy of Eastern monotheism, dualism denotes a binary opposition of an idea that contains two essential parts. The first formal concept of a "mind–body" split may be found in the divinity–secularity dualism of the ancient Persian religion of Zoroastrianism around the mid-fifth century BC. Gnosticism is a modern name for a variety of ancient dualistic ideas inspired by Judaism popular in the first and second century AD. These ideas later seem to have been incorporated into Galen's "tripartite soul" that led into both the Christian sentiments expressed in the later Augustinian theodicy and Avicenna's Platonism in Islamic Philosophy.

=== Descartes ===
René Descartes (1596–1650) believed that mind exerted control over the brain via the pineal gland:

My view is that this gland is the principal seat of the soul, and the place in which all our thoughts are formed.

— René Descartes, Treatise of Man

[The] mechanism of our body is so constructed that simply by this gland's being moved in any way by the soul or by any other cause, it drives the surrounding spirits towards the pores of the brain, which direct them through the nerves to the muscles; and in this way the gland makes the spirits move the limbs.

— René Descartes, Passions of the Soul

His posited relation between mind and body is called Cartesian dualism or substance dualism. He held that mind was distinct from matter, but could influence matter. How such an interaction could be exerted remains a contentious issue.

=== Kant ===
For Immanuel Kant (1724–1804) beyond mind and matter there exists a world of a priori forms, which are seen as necessary preconditions for understanding. Some of these forms, space and time being examples, today seem to be pre-programmed in the brain.

...whatever it is that impinges on us from the mind-independent world does not come located in a spatial or a temporal matrix,...The mind has two pure forms of intuition built into it to allow it to... organize this 'manifold of raw intuition'.

— Andrew Brook, Kant's view of the mind and consciousness of self: Transcendental aesthetic

Kant views the mind–body interaction as taking place through forces that may be of different kinds for mind and body.

=== Huxley ===
For Thomas Henry Huxley (1825–1895) the conscious mind was a by-product of the brain that has no influence upon the brain, a so-called epiphenomenon.

On the epiphenomenalist view, mental events play no causal role. Huxley, who held the view, compared mental events to a steam whistle that contributes nothing to the work of a locomotive.

— William Robinson, Epiphenomenalism

=== Whitehead ===
Alfred North Whitehead advocated a sophisticated form of panpsychism that has been called by David Ray Griffin panexperientialism.

=== Popper ===
For Karl Popper (1902–1994) there are three aspects of the mind–body problem: the worlds of matter, mind, and of the creations of the mind, such as mathematics. In his view, the third-world creations of the mind could be interpreted by the second-world mind and used to affect the first-world of matter. An example might be radio, an example of the interpretation of the third-world (Maxwell's electromagnetic theory) by the second-world mind to suggest modifications of the external first world.

The body–mind problem is the question of whether and how our thought processes in World 2 are bound up with brain events in World 1. ...I would argue that the first and oldest of these attempted solutions is the only one that deserves to be taken seriously [namely]: World 2 and World 1 interact, so that when someone reads a book or listens to a lecture, brain events occur that act upon the World 2 of the reader's or listener's thoughts; and conversely, when a mathematician follows a proof, his World 2 acts upon his brain and thus upon World 1. This, then, is the thesis of body–mind interaction.

— Karl Popper, Notes of a realist on the body–mind problem

=== Ryle ===
With his 1949 book, The Concept of Mind, Gilbert Ryle "was seen to have put the final nail in the coffin of Cartesian dualism".

In the chapter "Descartes' Myth," Ryle introduces "the dogma of the Ghost in the machine" to describe the philosophical concept of the mind as an entity separate from the body:

I hope to prove that it is entirely false, and false not in detail but in principle. It is not merely an assemblage of particular mistakes. It is one big mistake and a mistake of a special kind. It is, namely, a category mistake.

=== Searle ===
For John Searle (1932-2025) the mind–body problem is a false dichotomy; that is, mind is a perfectly ordinary aspect of the brain. Searle proposed biological naturalism in 1980.

According to Searle then, there is no more a mind–body problem than there is a macro–micro economics problem. They are different levels of description of the same set of phenomena. [...] But Searle is careful to maintain that the mental – the domain of qualitative experience and understanding – is autonomous and has no counterpart on the microlevel; any redescription of these macroscopic features amounts to a kind of evisceration, ...

— Joshua Rust, John Searle

== See also ==
- Binding problem
- Bodymind
- Chinese room
- Cognitive closure (philosophy)
- Cognitive neuroscience
- Connectionism
- Consciousness in animals
- Downward causation
- Descartes' Error
- Embodied cognition
- Existentialism
- Explanatory gap
- Free will
- Ideasthesia
- Namarupa (Buddhist concept)
- Neuroscience of free will
- Philosophical zombie
- Philosophy of artificial intelligence
- Pluralism
- Problem of mental causation
- Problem of other minds
- Psyche
- Qualia
- Reductionism
- Sacred–profane dichotomy
- Sentience
- Strange loop (self-reflective thoughts)
- The Mind's I (book on the subject)
- Turing test
- Vertiginous question
- William H. Poteat

== Bibliography ==
- Bunge, Mario (2014). The Mind–Body Problem: A Psychobiological Approach. Elsevier. ISBN 978-1-4831-5012-3.
- Feigl, Herbert (1958). "The 'Mental' and the 'Physical'". In Feigl, Herbert; Scriven, Michael; Maxwell, Grover (eds.). Concepts, Theories, and the Mind–Body Problem. Minnesota Studies in the Philosophy of Science. Vol. 2. Minneapolis: University of Minnesota Press. pp. 370–457.
- Gendlin, E. T. (2012a). "Line by Line translation on Aristotle's De Anima, Books I and II" (PDF).
- Gendlin, E. T. (2012b). "Line by Line translation on Aristotle's De Anima, Book III" (PDF).
- Hicks, R. D. (1907). Aristotle, De Anima. Cambridge University Press.
- Kim, J. (1995). "Mind–Body Problem", Oxford Companion to Philosophy. Ted Honderich (ed.). Oxford: Oxford University Press.
- Jaegwon Kim (2010). Essays in the Metaphysics of Mind. Oxford University Press. ISBN 978-0-19-162506-0.
- Massimini, M.; Tononi, G. (2018). Sizing up Consciousness: Towards an Objective Measure of the Capacity for Experience. Oxford University Press.
- Turner, Bryan S. (1996). The Body and Society: Exploration in Social Theory.
