= Biological naturalism =

Theory about the relationship between consciousness and body

Biological naturalism is a theory about, among other things, the relationship between consciousness and body (i.e., brain), and hence an approach to the mind–body problem. It was first proposed by the philosopher John Searle in 1980 and is defined by two main theses: 1) all mental phenomena, ranging from pains, tickles, and itches to the most abstruse thoughts, are caused by lower-level neurobiological processes in the brain; and 2) mental phenomena are higher-level features of the brain.

This entails that the brain has the right causal powers to produce intentionality. However, Searle's biological naturalism does not entail that brains and only brains can cause consciousness. Searle is careful to point out that while it appears to be the case that certain brain functions are sufficient for producing conscious states, our current state of neurobiological knowledge prevents us from concluding that they are necessary for producing consciousness. In his own words:

"The fact that brain processes cause consciousness does not imply that only brains can be conscious. The brain is a biological machine, and we might build an artificial machine that was conscious; just as the heart is a machine, and we have built artificial hearts. Because we do not know exactly how the brain does it we are not yet in a position to know how to do it artificially." ("Biological Naturalism", 2004)

== Overview ==
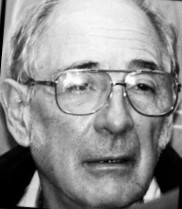
John Searle

Searle denies Cartesian dualism, the idea that the mind is a separate kind of substance to the body, as this contradicts our entire understanding of physics, and unlike Descartes, he does not bring God into the problem. Indeed, Searle denies any kind of dualism, the traditional alternative to monism, claiming the distinction is a mistake. He rejects the idea that because the mind is not objectively viewable, it does not fall under the rubric of physics.

Searle believes that consciousness "is a real part of the real world and it cannot be eliminated in favor of, or reduced to, something else" whether that something else is a neurological state of the brain or a computer program. He contends, for example, that the software known as Deep Blue knows nothing about chess. He also believes that consciousness is both a cause of events in the body and a response to events in the body.

On the other hand, Searle doesn't treat consciousness as a ghost in the machine. He treats it, rather, as a state of the brain. The causal interaction of mind and brain can be described thus in naturalistic terms: Events at the micro-level (perhaps at that of individual neurons) cause consciousness. Changes at the macro-level (the whole brain) constitute consciousness. Micro-changes cause and then are impacted by holistic changes, in much the same way that individual football players cause a team (as a whole) to win games, causing the individuals to gain confidence from the knowledge that they are part of a winning team.

He articulates this distinction by pointing out that the common philosophical term 'reducible' is ambiguous. Searle contends that consciousness is "causally reducible" to brain processes without being "ontologically reducible". He hopes that making this distinction will allow him to escape the traditional dilemma between reductive materialism and substance dualism; he affirms the essentially physical nature of the universe by asserting that consciousness is completely caused by and realized in the brain, but also doesn't deny what he takes to be the obvious facts that humans really are conscious, and that conscious states have an essentially first-person nature.

It can be tempting to see the theory as a kind of property dualism, since, in Searle's view, a person's mental properties are categorically different from his or her micro-physical properties. The latter have "third-person ontology" whereas the former have "first-person ontology". Micro-structure is accessible objectively by any number of people, as when several brain surgeons inspect a patient's cerebral hemispheres. But pain or desire or belief are accessible subjectively by the person who has the pain or desire or belief, and no one else has that mode of access. However, Searle holds mental properties to be a species of physical property—ones with first-person ontology. So this sets his view apart from a dualism of physical and non-physical properties. His mental properties are putatively physical (see "Property dualism" below).

== Criticism ==
There have been several criticisms of Searle's idea of biological naturalism.

Jerry Fodor suggests that Searle gives us no account at all of exactly why he believes that a biochemistry like, or similar to, that of the human brain is indispensable for intentionality. Fodor thinks that it seems much more plausible to suppose that it is the way in which an organism (or any other system for that matter) is connected to its environment that is indispensable in the explanation of intentionality. It is easier to see "how the fact that my thought is causally connected to a tree might bear on its being a thought about a tree. But it's hard to imagine how the fact that (to put it crudely) my thought is made out of hydrocarbons could matter, except on the unlikely hypothesis that only hydrocarbons can be causally connected to trees in the way that brains are."

John Haugeland takes on the central notion of some set of special "right causal powers" that Searle attributes to the biochemistry of the human brain. He asks us to imagine a concrete situation in which the "right" causal powers are those that our neurons have to reciprocally stimulate one another. In this case, silicon-based alien life forms can be intelligent just in case they have these "right" causal powers; i.e. they possess neurons with synaptics connections that have the power to reciprocally stimulate each other. Then we can take any speaker of the Chinese language and cover his neurons in some sort of wrapper which prevents them from being influenced by neurotransmitters and, hence, from having the right causal powers. At this point, "Searle's demon" (an English speaking nanobot, perhaps) sees what is happening and intervenes: he sees through the covering and determines which neurons would have been stimulated and which not and proceeds to stimulate the appropriate neurons and shut down the others himself. The experimental subject's behavior is unaffected. He continues to speak perfect Chinese as before the operation but now the causal powers of his neurotransmitters have been replaced by someone who does not understand the Chinese language. The point is generalizable: for any causal powers, it will always be possible to hypothetically replace them with some sort of Searlian demon which will carry out the operations mechanically. His conclusion is that Searle's view of the nature of causal powers is necessarily dualistic, "not intrinsically connected with the actual powers of physical objects."

Searle himself does not rule out the possibility for alternate arrangements of matter bringing forth consciousness other than biological brains.

=== Property dualism ===
Despite what many have said about his biological naturalism thesis, he disputes that it is dualistic in nature in a brief essay titled "Why I Am Not a Property Dualist". Firstly, he rejects the idea that the mental and physical are primary ontological categories, instead claiming that the act of categorisation is simply a way of speaking about our one world, so whether something is mental or physical is a matter of the vocabulary that one employs. He believes that a more useful distinction can be made between the biological and non-biological, in which case consciousness is a biological process. Secondly, he accepts that the mental is ontologically irreducible to the physical for the simple reason that the former has a first-person ontology and the latter a third-person ontology, but he rejects the property dualist notion of "over and above"; in other words, he believes that, causally speaking, consciousness is entirely reducible to and is nothing more than the neurobiology of the brain (again, because both are biological processes).

Thus, for Searle, the dilemma between epiphenomenalism and causal overdetermination that plagues the property dualist simply does not arise because, causally speaking, there is nothing there except the neurobiology of the brain, but because of the different ontologies of the mental and physical, the former is irreducible to the latter:

I say consciousness is a feature of the brain. The property dualist says consciousness is a feature of the brain. This creates the illusion that we are saying the same thing. But we are not, […]. The property dualist means that in addition to all the neurobiological features of the brain, there is an extra, distinct, non-physical feature of the brain, whereas I mean that consciousness is a state the brain can be in, in the way that liquidity and solidity are states that water can be in.

== See also ==
- Chinese room
- Direction of fit
- Evolutionary ethics
- Hylozoism
- Qualia

== Sources ==
- John R. Searle, "Biological Naturalism".
- John R. Searle, "Consciousness".
- John R. Searle, "Why I Am Not a Property Dualist".
- John R. Searle, The Mystery of Consciousness (London: Granta Publications, 1998).
- John R. Searle, The Rediscovery of the Mind (Massachusetts: MIT Press, 1994).
- John R. Searle, Mind: A Brief Introduction (New York: Oxford University Press, 2004).
