= Physicalism =

Metaphysical thesis

In metaphysics, physicalism is the view that everything is physical, that there is nothing over and above the physical, and that everything supervenes on the physical. It stands in direct opposition to idealism, which asserts that reality arises from the mind. Physicalism is a form of ontological monism—a single-substance account of the nature of our universe's reality (physicalism is open to the possibility of different universes with different physics, and is open to the possibility of causal openness via a foundational logical mechanism or mechanisms), in contrast to "two-substance" (mind–body dualist) or "many-substance" (pluralist) views. Physicalism is closely related to naturalism, though important distinctions exist between them.

Physicalism is also closely related to materialism, and has evolved from materialism with advancements in the physical sciences in explaining observed phenomena. The terms "physicalism" and "materialism" are often used interchangeably, but can be distinguished on the basis that physics describes more than just matter. Physicalism encompasses matter, but also energy, physical laws, space, time, spacetime, exotic matter, structure, physical processes, information, state, and forces, among other things, as described by physics and other sciences.

According to the PhilPapers Survey 2020, physicalism is the majority view among philosophers, at 51.9%, but there is also significant opposition to it.

Outside of philosophy, physicalism can refer to the preference or viewpoint that physics is the best or only way to render truth about the world or reality.

== Definition of physicalism in philosophy ==
The word "physicalism" was introduced into philosophy in the 1930s by Otto Neurath and Rudolf Carnap.

The use of "physical" in physicalism is a philosophical concept and can be distinguished from alternative definitions found in the literature (e.g., Karl Popper defined a physical proposition as one that can at least in theory be denied by observation). A "physical property", in this context, may be a metaphysical or logical combination of properties which are not physical in the ordinary sense. It is common to express the notion of "metaphysical or logical combination of properties" using the notion of supervenience. Supervenience is the idea that there cannot be two events alike in all physical respects but differing in some mental respect, or that an object cannot alter in some mental respect without altering in some physical respect. The reason to introduce supervenience is that physicalists usually suppose the existence of various abstract concepts that are non-physical in the ordinary sense of the word.

=== Type physicalism ===
Type physicalism, also known as mind-body identity theory, holds that mental events can be grouped into types that correlate with types of physical events. For instance, one type of mental events, such as pain, correlates with a particular type of physical events, such as C-fiber firings. On this account, all instances of pain correspond to situations where C-fibers are firing. Type physicalism can be understood as the position that there is an identity between types: any mental type is identical with some physical type.

A common argument against type physicalism is the problem of multiple realizability. Multiple realizability posits that the same mental state can be realized by different physical states. Another way to put it is that there is a many-to-one mapping from physical states to mental states.

=== Token physicalism ===
Token physicalism is the proposition that every particular mental event is a particular physical event (token physical event) but that there is no type-to-type mapping between mental events and physical events. The most common example of token physicalism is Davidson's anomalous monism. One of token physicalism's strengths is that it is compatible with multiple realizability. Mental states such as pain may be realized in any number of widely different physical events, without any type-like similarity between these physical events.

== Reductive and non-reductive physicalism ==
=== Reductionism ===
In the philosophy of mind, reductionism is commonly understood as the reduction of psychological phenomena to physics and chemistry. In a simplified form, reductionism implies that a system is nothing but the sum of its parts. There are both reductive and non-reductive versions of physicalism (reductive physicalism and non-reductive physicalism). Reductive physicalism is the view that mental states are nothing over and above physical states and are reducible to physical states.

=== Emergence ===
Emergentism is a theory that became popular in the early 20th century. Notions of strong emergence are commonly found in accounts of non-reductive physicalism. A property of a system is said to be emergent if it is a new outcome of some of the system's other properties and their interaction while it is itself different from them. Emergentism emphasizes that the whole is more than the sum of its parts. In the context of the philosophy of mind, emergence is often thought to entail property dualism.

== Arguments against physicalism ==
=== Knowledge argument ===
Though there have been many objections to physicalism throughout its history, many of them are concerned with the apparent contradiction of the existence of qualia in an entirely physical world. The most popular argument of this kind is the so-called knowledge argument as formulated by Frank Cameron Jackson, titled "Mary's room".

The argument asks us to consider Mary, a girl who has been forced to discover the world from a black-and-white room via a black-and-white television monitor throughout her life. She has access to books containing all physical knowledge. During her time in the room, she learns all the physical facts about the world, including all the physical facts about color. To a physicalist, it would seem that this entails Mary knowing everything about the world. But once she is let out of the room and into the world, it becomes apparent that there were things Mary did not know about the world, such as the feeling (the qualitative experience) of seeing color. If Mary did not have such knowledge, how can it be said that everything supervenes upon the physical?

==== Physicalist response ====
One response, developed by Lawrence Nemerow and David Lewis, is known as the ability hypothesis. The ability hypothesis distinguishes between propositional knowledge, such as "Mary knows that the sky is typically blue during the day", and knowledge-how, such as "Mary knows how to climb a mountain", and says that all Mary gains from seeing the world in color is knowledge-how. According to this response, Mary does gain knowledge from her experience, but it is not the propositional knowledge required for the knowledge argument to be logically sound.

=== Argument from philosophical zombies ===
One commonly issued challenge to a priori physicalism and physicalism in general is the "conceivability argument", or zombie argument. The conceivability argument runs roughly as follows:

1. According to physicalism, everything in our world (including consciousness) is physical.
2. Thus, if physicalism is true, a metaphysically possible world in which all physical facts are the same as in the actual world contains everything that exists in the actual world. In particular, conscious experience exists in such a world.
3. We can conceive of a world physically indistinguishable from our world but in which there is no consciousness (a zombie world). From this it follows that such a world is metaphysically possible.
4. Therefore, physicalism is false. (This follows from (2) and (3) by modus tollens.)

The possibility of philosophical zombies (p-zombies) entails that mental states do not supervene upon physical states, and thus that physicalism is false. Australian philosopher David Chalmers argues that the conceivability of a zombie entails a metaphysical possibility.

==== Physicalist response ====
Galen Strawson argues that it is impossible to establish the conceivability of zombies, so the argument, lacking its first premise, fails.

Daniel Dennett argues that "when philosophers claim that zombies are conceivable, they invariably underestimate the task of conception (or imagination), and end up imagining something that violates their own definition". He coined the term "zimboes"—p-zombies that have second-order beliefs—in arguing that p-zombies are incoherent: "Zimboes think^{Z} they are conscious, think^{Z} they have qualia, think^{Z} they suffer pains—they are just 'wrong' (according to this lamentable tradition), in ways that neither they nor we could ever discover!" In The Unimagined Preposterousness of Zombies (1995), Dennett compares consciousness to health.

Supposing that by an act of stipulative imagination you can remove consciousness while leaving all cognitive systems intact—a quite standard but entirely bogus feat of imagination—is like supposing that by an act of stipulative imagination, you can remove health while leaving all bodily functions and powers intact. ... Health isn't that sort of thing, and neither is consciousness.

Michael P. Lynch argues that the zombie conceivability argument forces us to either question whether we actually have consciousness or accept that zombies are impossible. If zombies falsely believe they are conscious, how can we be sure we are not zombies? We may believe we have conscious mental states when in fact we merely hold a false belief. Lynch thinks denying the possibility of zombies is more reasonable than questioning our own consciousness.

Daniel Stoljar has proposed what he calls "the phenomenal concept strategy". Roughly, this strategy attempts to show that only the concept of consciousness—not the property—is in some way "special" or sui generis. Essentially, he believes we are less likely to question physicalism if we can figure out why we think there is a difference between consciousness and physical processes.

=== Hempel's Dilemma ===
Physicalists have traditionally opted for a "theory-based" characterization of the physical in terms of either current physics or a future (ideal) physics. Hempel's Dilemma (named after the philosopher of science Carl Gustav Hempel) attacks physicalism by arguing that both of these approaches are problematic. If, on the one hand, we define the physical by reference to current physics, then physicalism is very likely to be false because it is very likely (by pessimistic meta-induction) that much of current physics is false. If, on the other hand, we define the physical in terms of a future (ideal) or completed physics, then physicalism is hopelessly vague or indeterminate.

==== Physicalist response ====
Some physicalists, like Andre Melnyk, accept the dilemma's first horn: they accept that the current definition of physicalism is very likely false as long it is more plausible than any currently formulated rival proposition, such as dualism. Melnyk maintains that this is the attitude most scientists hold toward scientific theories anyway. For example, a defender of evolutionary theory may well accept that its current formulation is likely to be revised in the future but defend it because they believe current evolutionary theory is more likely than any current rival idea, such as creationism. Thus Melnyk holds that one should define physicalism in relation to current physics and have a similar attitude toward its truth as most scientists have toward the truth of currently accepted scientific theories.

Some physicalists defend physicalism via alternative characterizations of physicalism. Frank Cameron Jackson, for example, has argued for an "object-based" conception of the physical. David Papineau and Barbara Montero have argued for a "via negativa" characterization of the physical. The gist of this approach is characterize the physical in terms of what it is not: the mental. In other words, the via negativa strategy understands the physical as the non-mental.

=== Argument from overdetermination ===
Figure demonstrating how M1 and M2 are not reduced to P1 and P2

Jaegwon Kim objects to non-reductive physicalism based on the problem of overdetermination. He proposes (using the chart on the right) that M1 causes M2 (these are mental events) and P1 causes P2 (these are physical events). M1 has P1 as its supervenience base (P1 realizes M1), and M2 has P2 as its supervenience base (P2 realizes M2). If P1 causes P2 and M1 causes M2, then we have a case of causal overdetermination. To avoid this causal overdetermination, either M1 or P1 must be eliminated as a cause of P2. Because of the principle of the causal closure of the physical, M1 is excluded. The non-reductive physicalist is then forced to choose between two unappealing options: accept overdetermination or embrace epiphenomenalism. Kim thus argues that mental causation can be preserved only by embracing a reductionist view, whereby mental properties are considered causally efficacious by being reduced to physical properties.

=== Argument from first-person perspectives ===
Christian List argues that the existence of first-person perspectives, i.e., one existing as oneself and not as someone else, refutes physicalism. He argues that since first-personal facts cannot supervene on physical facts, this refutes not only physicalism, but also most forms of dualism that have purely third-personal metaphysics. List also argues that there is a "quadrilemma" for theories of consciousness: that at most three of the following metaphysical claims can be true: "first-person realism", "non-solipsism", "non-fragmentation", and "one world"—and thus at least one of them must be false. He has proposed a model he calls the "many-worlds theory of consciousness" to reconcile the subjective nature of consciousness without lapsing into solipsism. These ideas are related to the vertiginous question proposed by Benj Hellie.

== Other views ==
=== Realistic physicalism ===
Galen Strawson's realistic physicalism or realistic monism is the view that physicalism entails panpsychism – or at least micropsychism. Strawson argues that "many—perhaps most—of those who call themselves physicalists or materialists [are mistakenly] committed to the thesis that physical stuff is, in itself, in its fundamental nature, something wholly and utterly non-experiential... even when they are prepared to admit with Eddington that physical stuff has, in itself, 'a nature capable of manifesting itself as mental activity', i.e. as experience or consciousness". Because experiential phenomena allegedly cannot be emergent from wholly non-experiential phenomena, philosophers are driven to substance dualism, property dualism, eliminative materialism and "all other crazy attempts at wholesale mental-to-non-mental reduction".

Real physicalists must accept that at least some ultimates are intrinsically experience-involving. They must at least embrace micropsychism. Given that everything concrete is physical, and that everything physical is constituted out of physical ultimates, and that experience is part of concrete reality, it seems the only reasonable position, more than just an 'inference to the best explanation'... Micropsychism is not yet panpsychism, for as things stand realistic physicalists can conjecture that only some types of ultimates are intrinsically experiential. But they must allow that panpsychism may be true, and the big step has already been taken with micropsychism, the admission that at least some ultimates must be experiential. 'And were the inmost essence of things laid open to us' I think that the idea that some but not all physical ultimates are experiential would look like the idea that some but not all physical ultimates are spatio-temporal (on the assumption that spacetime is indeed a fundamental feature of reality). I would bet a lot against there being such radical heterogeneity at the very bottom of things. In fact (to disagree with my earlier self) it is hard to see why this view would not count as a form of dualism... So now I can say that physicalism, i.e. real physicalism, entails panexperientialism or panpsychism. All physical stuff is energy, in one form or another, and all energy, I trow, is an experience-involving phenomenon. This sounded crazy to me for a long time, but I am quite used to it, now that I know that there is no alternative short of 'substance dualism'... Real physicalism, realistic physicalism, entails panpsychism, and whatever problems are raised by this fact are problems a real physicalist must face.

— Galen Strawson, Consciousness and Its Place in Nature: Does Physicalism Entail Panpsychism?

== See also ==
- Cognitive science
- Consciousness
- Empiricism
- Epiphenomenalism
- Hempel's dilemma
- Mary's Room
- Metaphysical naturalism
- Monism
- Multiple realizability
- Naturalism (Philosophy)
- Ontological pluralism
- Philosophy of mind
- Primary–secondary quality distinction
- Realistic physicalism
- Reductionism
- Supervenience
