= Emergentism =

Philosophical view concerning consiousness

Emergentism is a philosophical position holding that complex systems possess properties, behaviors, or laws that arise from the interaction of their fundamental parts but are not reducible to or predictable from them. A property of a system is said to be emergent if it is a new outcome of some other properties of the system and their interaction, while it is itself different from them. Within philosophy of science, emergentism is analyzed both as it contrasts with and parallels reductionism.

== In British philosophy ==
In his 1843 book A System of Logic, John Stuart Mill stated that "all organised bodies are composed of parts, similar to those composing inorganic nature, and which have even themselves existed in an inorganic state", including all forms of life, but that the "phenomena of life" are quite different to those of non-living matter.

In 1925, C. D. Broad published The Mind and its Place in Nature. He addressed the question of whether biology could be reduced to chemistry and onwards to physics. He suggested this could involve a mechanist answer, that all material is alike and all science is as well; or an emergentist view, that while material is all alike, there could be levels of organisation with what were later called emergent properties at each level.

Samuel Alexander proposed that a (human) mental process emerges from a neural process and that living systems, and those with mind, have "new emergent qualit[ies]" that do not occur at lower levels. Later philosophers have taken up Alexander's epistemological position, arguing either that the properties of higher levels (complex systems) cannot be predicted from understanding of lower levels, or that the properties can be described at the higher level (such as biology) but are not reducible to the concepts and behaviour of the lower level (such as physics).
