= Mental event =

Any event that happens within the mind of a conscious individual

A mental event is any event that happens within the subjective experience of a conscious individual. Examples include thoughts, feelings, decisions, dreams, and realizations. These events often make up the conscious life that are associated with cognitive function.

Some believe that mental events are not limited to human thought but can be associated with animals and artificial intelligence as well. Whether mental events are identical to complex physical events, or whether such an identity even makes sense, is central to the mind–body problem.

== Relation to mind–body problem ==
Some state that the mental and the physical are the very same property which cause any event(s). This view is known as substance monism. An opposing view is substance dualism, which claims that the mental and physical are fundamentally different and can exist independently. A third approach is Donald Davidson's anomalous monism. The Philosophy of Action states that every action is caused by prior thoughts or feelings, and understanding those mental events would in turn explain behavior.

Physicalism, a form of substance monism, states that everything that exists is either physical or depends on that which is physical. The existence of mental events has been used by philosophers as an argument against physicalism. For example, in his 1974 paper What Is it Like to Be a Bat?, Thomas Nagel argues that physicalist theories of mind cannot explain an organism's subjective experience because they cannot account for its mental events.

Epiphenomenalism, according to Stanford, "Is the view that mental events are caused by physical events in the brain, but have no effect upon any physical events." This stance then brings up the idea of introspection. According to David Lieberman, introspection is the ability for a person to observe his or her own mental state or events. Mental events can happen consciously and subconsciously at any given point. All mental events take place due to external stimuli. Which then must be processed via working memory.

== Mental events and working memory ==
Mental events must occur in the working memory of short term-store. Both working memory and short-term memory are essential to mental events and cognition. According to Lieberman (2021), Baddeley and Hitch (1974) proposed that working memory consists of three distinct subsystems: what are called a phonological loop, a visuo-spatial sketchpad, and central executive.

The phonological loop is responsible for holding speech-based sounds while the visuo-spatial sketchpad holds visual concepts in the mind. Both work independent of each other. Whereas the central executive is responsible for controlling both systems. The central executive is also responsible for aiding in tasks such as reasoning and understanding language.

In order for mental events to occur, in Homo sapiens, situations and events must be processed through working memory in order to be perceived as a mental event. Without this system of memory, situations cannot be stored as mental events. All thoughts, feelings, decisions, dreams, and realizations must cycle through this process indefinitely.

== Examples ==
- Mary is walking through a park and she sees and recognizes City Hall. This instance of seeing and recognizing City Hall is an instance of perception—something that happens in Mary's mind. That instance of perception is a mental event. It is an event because it is something that happens, and it is mental because it happens in Mary's mind.
- Mary feels happy after doing well on an exam and she smiles. This thought is a mental event. The smile is a physical event.
- An orca recognized a feeling of hunger. It eats a fish. The recognition of the feeling of hunger is a mental event. Eating the fish is the physical event.
- Mary is listening to her friend talk while admiring a painting she is looking at. Her visuo-spatial sketchpad is allowing her to think about the painting she likes, creating a mental event. Simultaneously, her phonological loop is allowing her to understand the conversation. Both systems are being operated by the central executive.

== See also ==
- Mental function
- Mental operations
- Mental rotation
- Functional neuroimaging
- Noumenon
- Psychedelic experience
- Synchronicity
- Working memory
- Vertiginous question
