= Dualism =

Division into two principles or kinds

Dualism divides a domain or phenomenon into two separate principles or kinds.

Dualism is a family of views that propose a fundamental division into two separate principles or kinds. It typically emphasizes a sharp distinction between independent or antagonistic sides, but in a broader sense, it also includes theories in which the two sides are correlated or complementary. Dualism contrasts with monism, which rejects any fundamental division, and with forms of pluralism that posit more than two basic principles.

Dualist views span many domains and disciplines. Mind–body dualism holds that mind and body are fundamentally different. It includes substance dualism, which interprets mind and body as distinct substances able to exist independently, and property dualism, which characterizes them as separate kinds of properties of the same substance. Ethical dualism targets the contrast between good and evil, regarding them as antagonistic forces that govern human conduct and the cosmic order. Platonic dualism divides reality into the intelligible realm of timeless Forms and the sensory realm of mutable matter, with similarities to the distinction between abstract and concrete objects in the contemporary discourse. Epistemological dualism holds that the object of perception is different from the real object, positing an essential gap between experience and reality. Dualist views also include the Chinese doctrine of yin and yang, conceiving reality as an interplay of two correlated forces, theological dualisms that distinguish God from the world, and the nature–culture divide contrasting the innate state of nature with human practices and institutions. Other dualisms are found in value theory, legal theory, physics, and indigenous belief systems. Critics argue that dualism ignores continuities, oversimplifies reality, creates pseudoproblems, or introduces evaluative biases.

Dualist thought has its roots in antiquity as a key theme of various religious traditions, such as Zoroastrianism, Jainism, the yinyang school, Samkhya, Gnosticism, and Manichaeism. Abrahamic religions were generally suspicious of dualism, while competing schools of thought along the monism-dualism spectrum emerged in medieval India. Mind–body substance dualism became a central topic in early modern Western philosophy following the works of René Descartes. It was largely replaced by materialist monism in the course of the 20th century as the dominant stance toward the mind–body problem.

== Definition and related terms ==
Dualism is a family of views that analyze a domain or phenomenon by proposing a fundamental division into two principles or aspects. Dualist theories differ in the type of division and principles they posit. For example, mind–body dualism argues for a basic contrast between mind and body as distinct substances or properties to explain the fundamental makeup of the world and human experience. Dualists maintain that the two principles are independent and cannot be reduced to one another. They typically emphasize contrast and separation, and some characterize the relationship between the two sides as an antagonistic conflict between opposing forces, such as the clash between good and evil in ethical dualism. In a broad sense, dualism also includes views where the two sides are correlated or complementary rather than opposed.

Dualist theories also vary in their scope of analysis and the domain they seek to explain, with some focusing on reality at large while others target specific areas. For instance, the scope of dualism in international law is limited to legal theory about the relation between international and domestic law. Dualism is a widely used theoretical approach found in many fields, including philosophy of mind, metaphysics, theology, mythology, science, ethics, and political theory. Accordingly, the contrast between dualist and non-dualist views affects diverse topics, shaping how to understand the structure of reality, the nature of knowledge, the value of entities, and right action.

Dualism contrasts with monism, which rejects any fundamental division. Monists argue that the domain in question is unified, meaning that all apparent distinctions ultimately arise from a single principle. For example, materialist monism rejects the mind–body division, arguing that mind is not an independent principle since everything is fundamentally matter. Because dualism posits two basic principles, it is a form of pluralism. It contrasts with other pluralistic theories that posit more than two basic principles. (Note: In Indian philosophy, the term nondualism is sometimes used as a synonym of monism.) For instance, the metaphysical pluralism of the pre-Socratic philosopher Empedocles holds that everything is composed of four root elements: fire, earth, air, and water. Since monism, dualism, and other forms of pluralism analyze a domain in terms of one or more principles, they differ from nihilist or eliminativist theories, which deny the reality of the analyzed phenomena.

Dualism is closely related to duality, dichotomy, and binary opposition. Although these terms overlap and are sometimes used interchangeably, they are not identical and carry distinct nuances. Duality is the quality of being twofold or having two distinct parts. Dualities are often associated with correlated parts, whereas dualisms tend to emphasize the opposition between the two sides. (Note: In physics, a duality is an equivalence of two theories.) A dichotomy is a division or splitting of something into two contrasting or mutually exclusive parts. Such divisions may or may not have a deeper philosophical significance and need not reflect reality, as in a false dichotomy. A binary opposition is a relation between two terms with opposite meanings. The concept plays a central role in structuralist and post-structuralist theories as the idea that cultural and linguistic systems generate and stabilize meaning through oppositional pairs.

The term dualism comes from the Latin word dualis, meaning 'containing two'. It entered the English language as the term dual in the 16th century. In the late 18th century, the abstract noun dualism was formed with the suffix -ism to denote a theory. The first known use was in 1794 by the satirist and scholar Thomas James Mathias.

== Mind–body dualism ==
Mind–body dualism regards mind and matter as fundamentally distinct substances or properties.

Mind–body dualism is the view that mind and body are fundamentally different. It holds that mental phenomena, such as thoughts, emotions, volitions, and consciousness, exist as nonphysical entities in addition to physical entities, such as the brain. A key motivation for this distinction is that physical and mental phenomena seem to have different characteristics. Physical objects encountered in everyday life have size, shape, color, weight, and spatial location. They appear objective, can be perceived through the senses, and can be measured using scientific instruments. Mental phenomena, by contrast, appear private and subjective without a clearly identifiable size, color, or spatial location. The mind–body problem is the challenge of explaining the relation between the two, and dualism is one approach to addressing it. Dualists debate the exact nature of body, mind, and their relation, giving rise to a variety of dualist theories.

=== Variations ===
Substance dualism asserts that body and mind are distinct substances. In metaphysics, a substance is a fundamental entity with independent existence. (Note: The exact definition of substance is disputed. Alternative characterizations focus on persistence through time rather than independent existence.) Accordingly, substance dualists typically assert that body and mind can each exist on their own, at least in principle. This view leaves open the possibility that the mind or soul may persist after bodily death, potentially in an afterlife. An influential substance dualism was formulated by René Descartes, who argued that bodies are extended things, while minds are thinking things.

Substance dualism contrasts with property dualism, which asserts that there are only physical substances with both physical and mental properties. In metaphysics, properties are features of entities, describing their characteristics or what those entities are like. Accordingly, the mind is characterized as an aspect of a substance but not as something that can exist on its own. The dualistic outlook of this view rests on the idea that mental properties cannot be reduced to physical descriptions, such as brain states, meaning that a scientific account of the world based only on physical attributes would be incomplete.

Various dualist theories in Indian philosophy resemble Western mind–body dualism but differ in some key aspects. In Samkhya philosophy, the foundational division is between purusha and prakriti. A purusha is an individual self, understood as a pure, contentless consciousness—an inactive and unchanging observer. Prakriti is materiality, encompassing not only ordinary material objects but also contents of consciousness, including cognition and emotion. Similar dualisms with some variations are also found in the schools of Yoga, Vaisheshika, and Nyaya.

=== Problem of interaction ===
A central topic in mind–body dualism is the problem of interaction: explaining whether or in which way mind and body causally influence each other. According to interactionism, this influence goes both ways, with the senses transmitting causal influences from body to mind and volitions translating mental plans into actions. For instance, a bodily injury can produce an experience of mental pain, and a mental fear can cause the body to flee. A difficulty for this view is the principle of conservation of energy, according to which the total energy of a closed physical system can neither increase nor decrease, making it unclear how the mind can influence without altering the energy balance. Another objection is based on the problem of overdetermination, according to which physical causes already explain all physical effects and do not require additional mental causes.

Epiphenomenalism, a different approach, holds that the interaction is only one-way: bodily phenomena cause mental phenomena, but mental phenomena have no effects. Accordingly, the mind is characterized as an epiphenomenon: a byproduct of brain processes without causal influence of its own. One criticism of this view focuses on the counterintuitive implication that mental states like fear do not influence behavior. The evolutionary challenge, another objection, questions how the mind could have developed at all if it is irrelevant to survival or reproduction.

Parallelism proposes that no interaction between mind and body takes place. It maintains that mental cause-effect chains and physical cause-effect chains run in parallel without influencing each other. A central problem for this view is explaining how or why the two realms are synchronized.

=== Arguments and alternative views ===
Philosophers debate many arguments for and against mind–body dualism. One supporting argument asserts that knowledge of all physical facts is not a complete knowledge of the world since it excludes first-person knowledge of experiential qualities. Its conclusion is that there must be non-physical facts to explain the knowledge gap. Another approach argues that one can imagine a mind without a body. It infers that the two concepts cannot be identical because the ability to conceive one without the other indicates a real distinction. Arguments against dualism often target the problem of interaction and the shortcomings of each proposed solution. Other objections center on the peculiar nature of the mind compared to physical things, such as subjectivity and privacy.

Monist approaches avoid the objections to dualism by rejecting the idea that mind and body are fundamentally distinct. Materialist monism argues that everything is ultimately physical, meaning that minds either do not exist or exist only as emergent features of physical systems. Idealist monism sees the mind as the sole fundamental principle, for example, by explaining matter as a construction of mental activity. According to neutral monism, reality is composed of a single kind that is neither material nor mental. Neutral monists typically accept that there are material and mental entities but understand them as derivative phenomena with a common root in a neutral basis.

== Religious dualisms ==
Several dualisms in religious thought seek to explain the nature of the world and its relation to the divine. Scholars distinguish various types, including ethical, moral, cosmic, cosmological, and theological dualisms. However, the definitions of these types vary across authors and may overlap.

=== Ethical ===
Ethical dualism holds that good and evil are antagonistic forces that govern human conduct and the cosmic order.

Ethical or moral dualism is the view that reality is governed by two antagonistic principles: good and evil. It holds that the world develops in the form of a struggle as these two forces battle for influence. The two forces are either conceived as impersonal principles or personified as rival deities embodying moral opposites. The opposing forces are sometimes assigned to different domains, such as heaven and hell. Some religions regard the conflict as eternal and unresolvable, while others introduce an eschatological or soteriological dimension, predicting a final triumph of good over evil. (Note: The terms cosmic and cosmological dualism are often used in a similar sense, but their exact definition varies from author to author. According to one proposal, cosmic dualism focuses primarily on the distinction between the two sides while cosmological dualism uses this distinction to explain how the world was created.)

Ethical dualism plays a central role in Zoroastrianism, an ancient Iranian religion that frames existence as the conflict between the deities Ahura Mazda and Angra Mainyu. Ahura Mazda is the benevolent and wise spirit responsible for creation, while Angra Mainyu is his destructive and deceitful adversary. Zoroastrianism calls on humans to support truth and order in the conflict against falsehood and chaos, predicting the eventual victory of Ahura Mazda. Manichaeism, another dualist religion, characterizes the fundamental conflict as a struggle between light and darkness, two eternal and equally fundamental principles. Light is the principle of goodness, associated with spirit and wisdom. Darkness is the principle of evil and belongs to matter and ignorance. The battle also takes place within each individual: the light of the human soul seeks to escape darkness as it is trapped in a material body.

Ethical dualism contrasts with monist theories that see the good as the singular foundational principle. According to this view, evil is not an independent force but merely a lack or an absence of goodness. This outlook is found in Christian thought. For example, Augustine of Hippo argued that there is only a single, benevolent, and all-powerful God. According to him, evil is a kind of privation that arises when free human beings make bad decisions and thereby fail to participate fully in the good. (Note: Another discussion of the problem of the existence of evil is found in Pierre Bayle's Historical and Critical Dictionary, in which Bayle contrasted monotheist with dualist perspectives. Bayle quoted extensively from Thomas Hyde's earlier discussion of dualism in ancient Persian religions, helping to popularize the term.) Some traditions of thought stand between monism and dualism: they accept a single foundational principle while positing an opposing force as a secondary, derivative principle whose source lies in its counterpart. For example, several gnostic systems distinguish between the supreme deity and a demiurge who functions as an inferior, misguided creator introducing malevolence or ignorance.

=== Others ===
Some theological dualisms see God and the world as fundamentally distinct.

Not all religious dualisms involve principles or forces actively in conflict with each other. Some posit correlated principles that govern the cosmic order by balancing or complementing each other without a hostile struggle. A central dualism in ancient Chinese thought focuses on the contrast between yin and yang. They are understood as correlated forces that describe how things arise, interact, and stay in balance. Yin is the female principle associated with earth, darkness, and passivity. Yang is the male principle associated with heaven, brightness, and activity. Yin and yang are understood as dual aspects of all things. As interdependent forces, neither is ranked above the other. Instead, the ideal is to cultivate a dynamic harmony between them. Neo-Confucian thought explores another dualism involving two inseparable principles. It distinguishes between li—the general pattern or rational order of the cosmos—and qi—the vital force that actualizes this pattern and animates things.

The contrast between Brahman and maya is a frequently discussed dualism in Indian thought. Brahman is the ultimate reality, a state of perfect unity and pure existence without divisive qualities. Maya describes the world of illusory appearances, characterized by constant change, a multiplicity of entities, and a deceptive sense of separation from the divine unity. This duality plays a central role in the school of Advaita Vedanta, which asserts that the contrast is no true ontological dualism since maya is an illusion, meaning that ultimate reality is fundamentally unified. Advaita Vedanta holds that the self is trapped in maya and mistakes the world of illusions for ultimate reality. It teaches overcoming this ignorance to achieve liberation.

A form of theological dualism, often addressed in monotheistic religions, concerns the relation between God and the world. It asserts that the two are radically different: God creates and governs the world but does not belong to it. For example, classical theism holds that God is the transcendent, eternal creator and sustainer of the world, existing before and independently of its creation. Classical theists typically emphasize the qualitative distinction between God's perfect attributes, such as omnipotence, omniscience, and omnibenevolence, in contrast to the imperfections found in the world. This God-world dualism contrasts with monist views that reject a strict distinction. According to pantheism, God and the world are identical, meaning that God is fully immanent in the creation. Panentheism, a related view, maintains that the world is part of God, making God both immanent and transcendent.

== Platonic dualism ==
Platonic dualism distinguishes between the intelligible realm of abstract Forms and the sensory realm of concrete matter.

Platonic dualism holds that reality is divided into two distinct realms: the intelligible realm of Forms and the sensory realm of matter. (Note: The term Platonic dualism is also used in the context of mind–body dualism for the view that human souls are immaterial.) Platonic Forms are perfect and immutable ideas, such as the Forms of beauty, justice, and goodness. They constitute the essence of physical things but exist independently of them. Platonic Forms contrast with matter, which is accessible to sensory perception as a changeable substance. Material things imitate the Forms to varying degrees but fail to fully embody them, for example, as degrees of justice without reaching perfect justice. Because of this inadequacy, Plato argued that ideal Forms cannot be learned from experience and, as the objects of true knowledge, have a higher degree of existence.

A related contrast in contemporary philosophy is between concrete and abstract objects. Concrete objects exist in spacetime and have causes and effects, such as a rock, a river, and a cat. Abstract objects have no spatiotemporal location and do not enter into causal relations, such as the number 4, the concept of a triangle, and the proposition that snow is white. (Note: Various academic debates focus on the precise definition of abstract objects and the question of which entities fall under this definition.)

In contrast to Plato's view, abstract objects are typically not treated as a higher form of being in the contemporary discourse. On the contrary, challenges are more commonly directed at the reality and ontological status of abstract objects, while the existence of concrete objects is widely accepted. Critics of abstract objects frequently focus on their peculiar nature, questioning their status as causally inert entities and the difficulty of explaining how knowledge of such entities is possible. Supporters of abstract objects, termed Platonists, often cite indispensability arguments, according to which abstract objects exist because they play key roles in mathematical and scientific theories, making them indispensable to a rigorous scientific explanation of the world.

== Epistemological dualism ==
Epistemological dualism holds that subjectively experienced objects are distinct from real objects.

Epistemological dualism, also known as indirect realism or representationalism, posits a fundamental division between experience and reality. It holds that perception is not in direct contact with the world, asserting that the subjectively experienced object is distinct from the real object. Epistemological dualists typically maintain that external objects cause ideas or impressions in the mind, which represent those objects but are not identical to them. For example, sense-datum theorists argue that the immediate objects of perception are not material objects but sense data—sensory qualities such as colors, shapes, and sounds. According to epistemological dualism, people have direct knowledge of mental contents but only indirect knowledge of the entities that cause them or are represented by them. This view contrasts with epistemological monism or direct realism, which asserts that the experienced object is identical to the real object, making direct knowledge possible.

A closely related form of epistemological dualism is found in the work of Immanuel Kant, who distinguished between phenomena and noumena. Phenomena are appearances of things, while noumena are things as they are in themselves. Kant argued that the mind actively constructs the experience of the world by organizing it according to principles, such as space, time, causality, and the categories of understanding, which determine the structure of all possible experiences. This view led him to posit a gap between phenomena and noumena, arguing that knowledge of the world is limited to the realm of appearances and cannot penetrate the noumenal realm.

An argument in favor of epistemological dualism cites its ability to explain the similarities between veridical perceptions and non-veridical experiences, such as illusions and hallucinations. According to epistemological dualism, these experiences have the same basic structure involving a contrast between internal contents and external objects, with the difference lying in the accuracy of the relation between content and object. A central objection holds that epistemological dualism leads to skepticism, claiming that the gap between experience and the world makes knowledge ultimately impossible.

== Other forms ==
Hylomorphism, also called Aristotelian dualism, is the view that every physical entity is composed of two aspects: matter and form. Matter is the underlying stuff that makes up entities with the potential to manifest patterns and persist through changes. Form is the organizing principle of an entity, encompassing not only shape but the intrinsic arrangement that determines the entity's essence. Unlike Platonic dualism, hylomorphism does not posit that matter or form can exist on their own in different realms. Instead, it regards them as correlated and inseparable principles that explain the structural and functional unity of concrete entities. Other dualisms in metaphysics exist between being and appearance, being and becoming, being and non-being, particulars and universals, and matter and life.

In ethics and value theory, the fact–value dualism, also called fact–value distinction and fact–value dichotomy, posits a fundamental division between descriptive and evaluative statements. Descriptive statements report facts about the world, while evaluative statements express value judgments about good and bad or right and wrong. This dualism is closely related to the is–ought problem or Hume's law, which states that one cannot deduce an evaluative statement about what ought to be from a descriptive statement about what is. The dualism of practical reason also belongs to the field of ethics. It is the view, primarily associated with Henry Sidgwick, that practical rationality is governed by two competing and irreconcilable principles: egoism and utilitarianism. Egoism holds that rational action is driven by self-interest and aims to do what is good for the actor. Utilitarianism holds that people should promote everyone's well-being. The dualism of practical reason asserts that no higher principle reconciles these two approaches, meaning that conflicts between self-interest and universal well-being are, in principle, rationally irresolvable.

The nature–culture dualism, also called the nature–culture divide, is the tendency to treat nature and culture as separate and opposing realms. It conceives nature as an original state of the external environment, free from human influence. Culture is understood as the sphere of human practices and institutions, including technology and human-made meanings. The nature–culture dualism plays a central role in the idea that humans are exceptional in a positive or negative sense. Positively, it can be used to justify human domination over nature by establishing a rational order; negatively, it may characterize humans as a malicious influence that disrupts the natural world and degrades its ecosystems. Nature–culture dualism contrasts with monist views that see a continuum between nature and culture rather than a strict separation. A related dualism focusing on the divide between nature and humans distinguishes two fundamental types of explanation: based on causes and based on reasons. It asserts that explanations of natural events proceed by identifying causes and effects, whereas explanations of human actions rely on reasons that motivate people to act without reducing their behavior to causal mechanisms.

Soul dualism is the view that a person has two souls. It is found in several indigenous belief systems and can take various forms. One anthropological classification describes the indigenous distinction between a stationary or body soul, which is tied to the body as its animating vital principle, and a mobile or free soul, which can separate from the body in dreams or trance states.

In legal theory, dualism is a view about the relation between domestic and international law. Domestic law operates within a state as a set of rules governing how individuals and institutions may behave, including a country's constitution and its criminal and civil codes. International law encompasses conventions and treaties between states and other international actors, such as the UN Charter and the Geneva Conventions. Dualism holds that these domains of law are fundamentally different and function independently as separate legal systems. It contrasts with monism, which emphasizes the unity of these two domains, arguing that there is ultimately only a single universal legal system encompassing both. The difference between monism and dualism is particularly relevant for cases where domestic and international law conflict, raising the question of whether one system should take precedence over the other.

In quantum physics, the wave-particle dualism or wave-particle duality is the idea that quantum entities exhibit both wave-like and particle-like behavior. For example, light behaves similarly to a wave by showing interference and diffraction patterns, but also carries discrete energy quanta, known as photons, which interact with matter (e.g., in a photon detector), as if they were particles.

== Criticisms ==
Several criticisms of dualism have been formulated. Most target specific types, such as objections to mind–body dualism. However, some arguments seek to undermine dualism as a whole by challenging general patterns in most or all of its forms. They typically assert that the strict division of a domain into two opposing categories is misguided since it ignores continuities or oversimplifies the complexity of reality. Dualist thought may further lead to pseudoproblems, such as the difficulty of explaining how two realms, regarded as fundamentally distinct, can interact. It can also introduce evaluative biases that privilege one side over the other. The hierarchies that may result from dualist thought were of particular interest to postmodern philosophers. For example, Jacques Derrida regarded the tendency to think in binary oppositions as a hallmark of Western thought and proposed the method of deconstruction to undermine strict oppositions.

Other objections focus on the term dualism rather than dualist theories. They question its academic usefulness, arguing that it is too vague and ambiguous to serve as a precise analytical category. Critics highlight the lack of consensus on the term's exact meaning and the difficulty of distinguishing it from related labels, such as duality.

== History ==
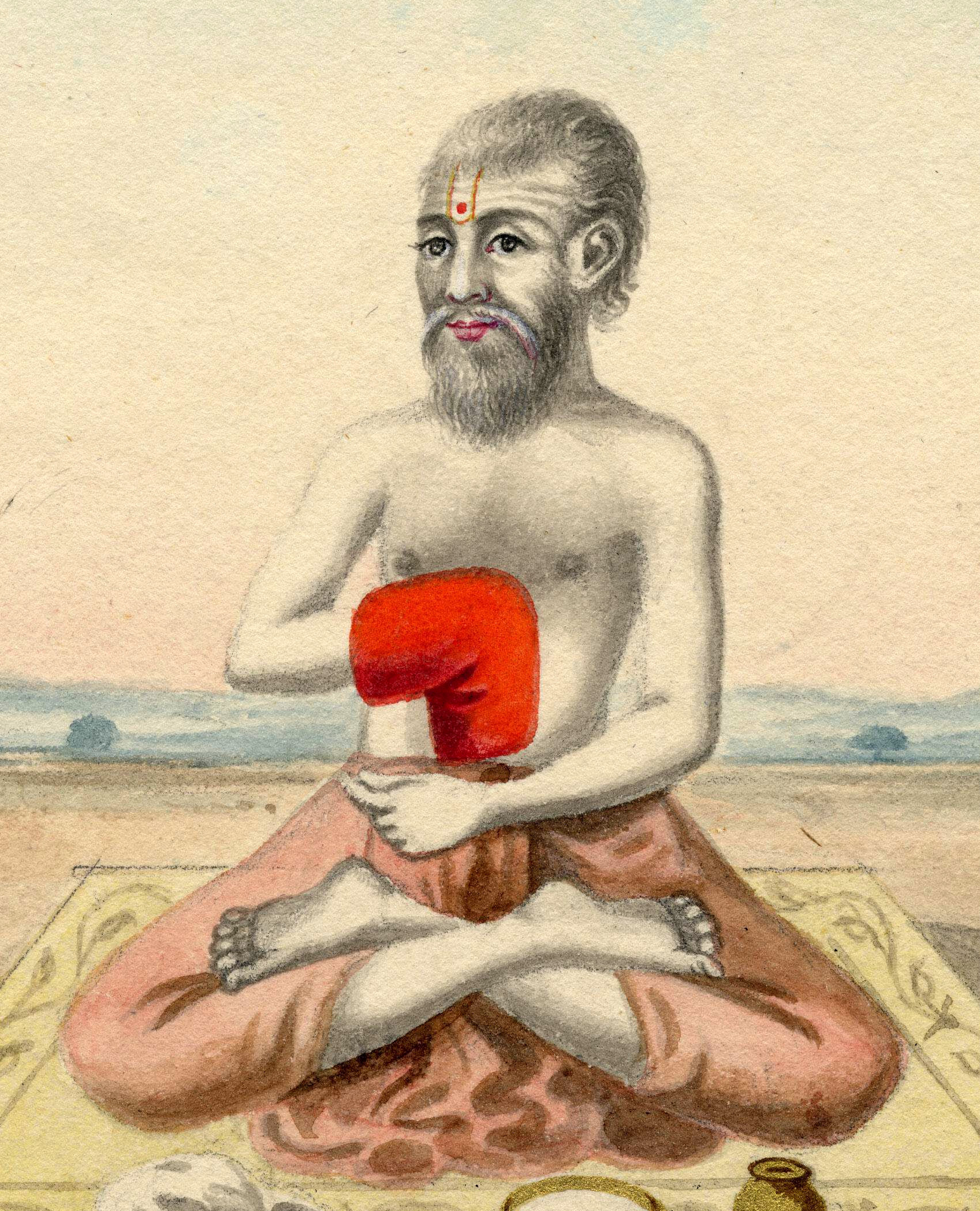
Kapila, a founding father of Samkhya

The taijitu symbol, with the black area representing yin and the white area representing yang

Dualism originated in ancient thought. Zoroastrianism, an early form of ethical dualism, emerged in Persia in the 2nd or 1st millennium BCE. It regarded the world as a struggle between good and evil, personified as the conflict between the deities Ahura Mazda and Angra Mainyu. (Note: Scholars debate the status of the myth of Osiris and Seth from ancient Egypt as a type of dualism, contrasting life and fertility with disorder and sterility.) In ancient Greece, Pythagoras (c. 570 – c. 490 BCE) and his followers believed in the dualistic conception of the transmigration of souls and endorsed a cosmological dualism, according to which opposites are real features of the world. Plato (c. 427 – c. 347 BCE) introduced a strict division of reality into intelligible Forms, which have timeless existence, and sensory matter, which is a mutable substance. He argued that the Forms are the objects of true knowledge while material entities imitate them without fully reflecting their perfection. His student Aristotle (384–322 BCE) challenged the view that forms have independent existence. Instead, he proposed hylomorphism, which treats matter and form as correlated and inseparable aspects of concrete entities. In the 1st and 2nd centuries CE, Gnosticism flourished as a family of Hellenistic religious and philosophical views. Many of its strands advocate dualist views, focusing on the contrast between evil matter and good spirit and arguing that each person's soul is destined to free itself from the material prison of the body. Manichaeism is a closely related Persian religion that originated in the 3rd century CE, sometimes considered a form of Gnosticism. It sees a foundational conflict between the principles of light and darkness, corresponding to a struggle of spirit and wisdom against matter and ignorance.

In ancient India, Jainism emerged roughly in the 6th century BCE as a religious tradition that teaches a basic dualism between matter and soul. It argues that souls are reborn because they accumulate karmic matter and can achieve liberation from matter and rebirth by following the right lifestyle. A related dualism is found in Samkhya, one of the main schools of Hindu philosophy. It identifies and contrasts two foundational principles: purusha—a pure consciousness and inactive observer—and prakriti—the primal material nature whose activity gives rise to all manifest phenomena.

In ancient China, the yinyang school of thought was active in the 1st millennium BCE. It regards yin and yang as two complementary principles acting as an interdependent duality of all things: yin represents femaleness, passivity, and darkness, while yang stands for maleness, activity, and brightness. Another foundational contrast was proposed by the neo-Daoist philosopher Wang Bi (226–249 CE), who introduced a basic division between being and non-being. He held that non-being serves as the source and foundation of all phenomena and transcends the contrast between yin and yang.

In the late classical and postclassical periods, Abrahamic religions were generally suspicious of dualism. Christian thought contained some dualist elements, such as the contrast between God and Satan and the belief that the soul is distinct from the body and can survive bodily death. However, these strands were often counterbalanced by monist tendencies, such as the belief in a single God as the ultimate source of the world. Significant deviations from this monist outlook were branded as heresies, including the Paulicians, Bogomils, and Cathars. Augustine of Hippo (354–430 CE) rejected the ethical dualism of Manichaeism, arguing that evil is not a substantive force but rather an absence of goodness. Influenced by Aristotle, Thomas Aquinas (1224–1274 CE) embraced hylomorphism and adapted it to Christianity. He regarded all concrete entities as composites of matter, which carries potentiality, and form, which corresponds to actuality. Similar to the Christian tradition, Islamic thought, with its emphasis on monotheism, tended to avoid dualistic tendencies.

Various developments in medieval India centered on the contrast between monism and dualism, leading to the emergence of distinct schools of thought. In the 8th century, Shankara founded Advaita Vedanta, a strict monism holding that ultimate reality is fundamentally unified while the experienced multiplicity of separate entities is an illusion. In the 11th or 12th century, Ramanuja proposed Vishishtadvaita, a qualified nondualism that accepts the cosmic unity of Brahman but also recognizes non-illusory distinctions within that unity. The dualist school of Dvaita Vedanta emerged in the 13th century through the works of Madhva, who argued for a fundamental difference between the independent reality of God and the dependent reality of other entities, including souls and matter. Meanwhile, in China, the neo-Confucian thinker Zhu Xi (1130–1200) proposed a basic division between li and qi, corresponding to the contrast between the abstract, rational order of the universe and the animating life force that actualizes this pattern.

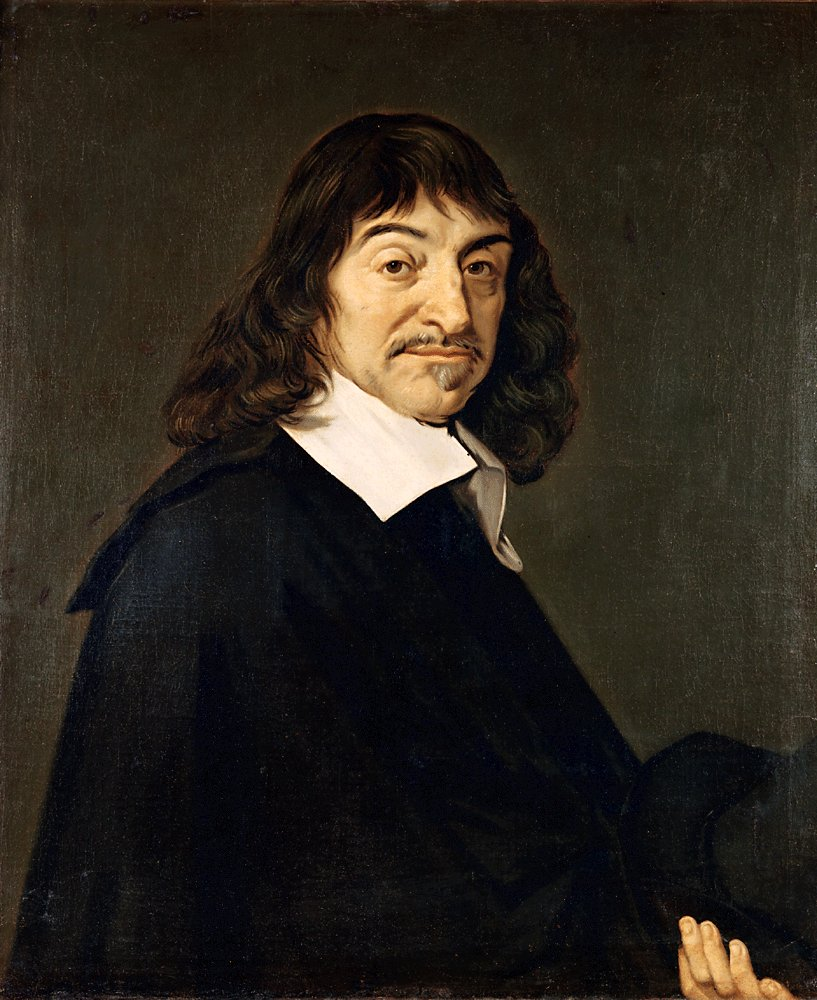
René Descartes proposed substance dualism, seeing mind and body as distinct substances that interact with each other.

In the early modern period, René Descartes (1596–1650) developed an influential mind–body dualism. He held that body and mind are fundamentally distinct substances: bodies are extended in space, whereas minds are unextended, thinking entities. Descartes regarded humans as a union of mind and body, arguing that the two substances interact but can exist on their own. Baruch Spinoza (1632–1677) criticized this substance dualism, proposing instead a rigorous monism that treats mind and body as two attributes of a single substance. Spinoza's thought also opposed theological dualisms between God and the world: he argued for a pantheism according to which there exists only a single substance, referring to it as God or Nature. Another response to Descartes's dualism came from Gottfried Wilhelm Leibniz (1646–1716), who rejected interactionism and suggested that mind and body are in a pre-established harmony without causal interaction. David Hume (1711–1776) drew a strict distinction between what is and what ought to be, arguing that descriptive and evaluative statements are fundamentally different. Immanuel Kant (1724–1804) emphasized the epistemological division into appearances and things in themselves, maintaining that knowledge is limited to the realm of appearances but cannot access the things in themselves. Thomas Henry Huxley (1825–1895) sought to solve the interaction problem of mind–body dualism by formulating epiphenomenalism—the theory that physical events cause mental events, but mental events do not influence physical events. Wilhelm Dilthey (1833–1911) proposed a dualist approach to understanding according to which causal explanations in natural sciences are fundamentally different from interpretative understanding in the human sciences.

In the course of the 20th century, substance dualism was largely replaced by materialism, partly because of the interaction problem and scientific advances in the empirical study of the mind. Philosophers discussed many monist approaches to the mind–body problem, such as behaviorism, functionalism, type identity theory, eliminative materialism, and neutral monism. Property dualism emerged as a dualist alternative, suggesting that mind and body are not separate substances but different kinds of properties of the same substance. Postmodern philosophers challenged dualist thinking in terms of strict oppositions, exploring how it may rely on hidden assumptions and introduce evaluative biases.

== See also ==
- Dilemma – Problem requiring a choice between equally undesirable alternatives
- Dualism (cybernetics)
- Duality (electrical circuits)
- Duality (mathematics)
- List of dualities
- Splitting (psychology) – Failure to think in nuances
