= Jaegwon Kim =

Korean-American philosopher (1934–2019)

- Born: September 12, 1934; Daegu, Japanese Korea
- Died: November 27, 2019 (aged 85)

Education
- Education: Seoul National University; Dartmouth College; Princeton University
- Doctoral advisors: Carl Gustav Hempel

Philosophical work
- Era: Contemporary philosophy
- Region: Western philosophy
- School: Analytic
- Institutions: Brown University
- Doctoral students: Alyssa Ney
- Main interests: Action theory; Epistemology; Metaphysics; Philosophy of mind; Philosophy of science
- Notable ideas: Reductive physicalism Weak supervenience Causal exclusion argument Event identity theory Criticism of naturalized epistemology as merely descriptive in scope

Korean name
- Hangul: 김재권
- Hanja: 金在權
- RR: Gim Jaegwon
- MR: Kim Chaegwŏn

Jaegwon Kim (September 12, 1934 – November 27, 2019) was a Korean-American philosopher. At the time of his death, Kim was an emeritus professor of philosophy at Brown University. He also taught at several other leading American universities during his lifetime, including the University of Michigan, Cornell University, the University of Notre Dame, Johns Hopkins University, and Swarthmore College. He is best known for his work on mental causation, the mind–body problem and the metaphysics of supervenience and events. Key themes in his work include: a rejection of Cartesian metaphysics, the limitations of strict psychophysical identity, supervenience, and the individuation of events. Kim's work on these and other contemporary metaphysical and epistemological issues is well represented by the papers collected in Supervenience and Mind: Selected Philosophical Essays (1993).

== Biography ==
Kim took two years of college at Seoul National University, South Korea as a French literature major, before transferring to Dartmouth College in 1955. Soon after, at Dartmouth, he changed to a combined major in French, mathematics, and philosophy, and received a B.A. degree. After Dartmouth, he went to Princeton University, where he earned his Ph.D. in philosophy.

Kim was the emeritus William Herbert Perry Faunce Professor of Philosophy at Brown University (since 1987). He also taught at Swarthmore College, Cornell University, the University of Notre Dame, Johns Hopkins University, and, for many years, at the University of Michigan, Ann Arbor. From 1988 to 1989, he was president of the American Philosophical Association, Central Division. Since 1991, he has been a fellow of the American Academy of Arts and Sciences. Along with Ernest Sosa, he was a joint editor of the quarterly philosophical journal Noûs.

According to Kim, two of his major philosophical influences are Carl Hempel and Roderick Chisholm. Hempel, who sent him a letter encouraging him to go to Princeton, was a "formative influence". More specifically, Kim claims that he hopes he learned "a certain style of philosophy, one that emphasizes clarity, responsible argument, and aversion to studied obscurities and feigned profundities." From Chisholm he learned "not to fear metaphysics." This allowed him to go beyond the logical positivist approaches that he had learned from Hempel in his investigations in metaphysics and the philosophy of mind. Although not a logical positivist, Kim's work always respected the limitations on philosophical speculation imposed by the sciences.

== Work ==
Kim's philosophical work focuses on the areas of philosophy of mind, metaphysics, action theory, epistemology, and philosophy of science.

=== Philosophy of mind ===
Kim has defended various mind–body theories during his career. He began defending a version of the identity theory in the early 1970s, and then moved to a non-reductive version of physicalism, which relied heavily on the supervenience relation.

Kim eventually rejected strict physicalism on the grounds that it provided an insufficient basis for resolving the mind–body problem. In particular, he concluded that the hard problem of consciousness—according to which a detailed and comprehensive neurophysical description of the brain would still not account for the fact of consciousness—is insurmountable in the context of a thoroughgoing physicalism. His arguments against physicalism can be found in his two latest monographs: Mind in a Physical World (1998) and Physicalism, or Something Near Enough (2005). Kim claims "that physicalism will not be able to survive intact and in its entirety." This, according to Kim, is because qualia (the phenomenal or qualitative aspect of mental states) cannot be reduced to physical states or processes. Kim claims that "phenomenal mental properties are not functionally definable and hence functionally irreducible" and "if functional reduction doesn't work for qualia, nothing will." Thus, there is an aspect of the mind that physicalism cannot capture.

In his later years, Kim defended the thesis that intentional mental states (e.g., beliefs and desires) can be functionally reduced to their neurological realizers, but that the qualitative or phenomenal mental states (e.g., sensations) are irreducibly non-physical and epiphenomenal. He, thus defended a version of property dualism, although Kim argued his position was "something near enough" physicalism. As of March, 2008, Kim still saw physicalism to be the most comprehensive worldview that is irreplaceable with any other world view.

In a 2008 interview with Korean daily newspaper Joongang Ilbo, Kim stated that we must seek a naturalistic explanation for mind because mind is a natural phenomenon, and supernatural explanation only provides "one riddle over another". He believed that any correct explanation for the nature of mind would come from natural science rather than philosophy or psychology.

=== Argument against non-reductive physicalism ===
Figure demonstration how M1 and M2 are not reduced to P1 and P2

Kim has raised an objection based on causal closure and overdetermination to non-reductive physicalism.

The non-reductive physicalist is committed to following three principles: the irreducibility of the mental to the physical, some version of mental-physical supervenience, and the causal efficaciousness of mental states. The problem, according to Kim, is that when these three commitments are combined with a few other well-accepted principles, an inconsistency is generated that entails the causal impotence of mental properties. The first principle, which most ontological physicalists would accept, is the causal closure of the physical domain, according to which, every physical effect has a sufficient physical cause. The second principle Kim notes is that of causal exclusion, which holds that no normal event can have more than one sufficient cause. The problem is that a behavior cannot have as its cause, both a physical event and a (supervening) mental event, without resulting in a case of overdetermination (thus violating the principle of causal exclusion). The result is that physical causes exclude mental states from causally contributing to the behavior.

In detail: he proposes (using the chart on the right) that M1 causes M2 (these are mental events) and P1 causes P2 (these are physical events). M1 has P1 as its supervenience base, and M2 has P2 as its supervenience base. The only way for M1 to cause M2, is by causing its supervenience base P2 (a case of mental-to-physical causation). If P1 causes P2, and M1 causes P2, then we have a case of causal overdetermination. Applying the principle of causal-exclusion, either P1 or M1 must be eliminated as a cause of P2. Given the principle of the causal closure of the physical domain, M1 is excluded.

The non-reductive physicalist is forced to choose between two unappealing options: one could reject the causal-exclusion principle and claim that in this scenario we are dealing with a genuine case of overdetermination, or one could embrace epiphenomenalism. Kim argues that mental causation can only be preserved by rejecting the premise of irreducibility in favor of reduction; in order for mental properties to be considered causally efficacious, they must be reducible to physical properties.

=== Metaphysics ===
Kim's work in metaphysics focuses primarily on events and properties.

Kim developed an event identity theory, but has not defended it recently. This theory holds that events are identical if and only if they occur in the same time and place and instantiate the same property. Thus if one waves ten fingers, several events occur, including the waving of an even number of fingers, the event of waving fingers that are evenly divisible by five, and evenly divisible by ten. Some have criticized his theory as producing too many events.

Kim also theorized that events are structured. He is known for a property-exemplification account of events. They are composed of three things: Object(s), a property and time or a temporal interval. Events are defined using the operation [x, P, t].

A unique event is defined by two principles: the existence condition and the identity condition. The existence condition states "[x, P, t] exists if and only if object x exemplifies the n-adic P at time t". This means a unique event exists if the above is met. The identity condition states "[x, P, t] is [y, Q, t`] if and only if x=y, P=Q and t=t`".

=== Epistemology ===
Kim is a critic of the naturalized epistemology popularized by Willard Van Orman Quine in the latter half of the twentieth century. Kim's influential article "What is 'Naturalized Epistemology'?" (1988) argues that "naturalized" epistemologies like Quine's are not proper epistemologies as they are merely descriptive in scope, while one generally expects an "epistemology" to make normative claims about knowledge. Kim argues that mere description of belief-forming practices cannot account for justified belief. (He also argues that to even individuate beliefs, the naturalized epistemologist must presuppose normative criteria of justification.) Naturalized epistemology cannot address the issue of justification, and therefore it does not share the same aspiration as the traditional approach to epistemology.

== Awards ==
- 2014: Kyung-Ahm Prize, Kyung-Ahm Education & Cultural Foundation

== Selected publications ==
The following is a partial list of publications by Jaegwon Kim.

- (1984) "Epiphenomenal and Supervenient Causation", Midwest Studies in Philosophy, Vol. IX, Peter A. French, Theodore E. Uehling Jr., and Howard K. Wettstein, eds. Minneapolis: University of Minnesota Press, 1984, pp. 257–70.
- (1988) "What is 'Naturalized Epistemology'?", Philosophical Perspectives, Vol. 2 (1988): 381–405.
- (1993) Supervenience and Mind, Cambridge University Press.
- (1998) Mind in a Physical World, MIT Press.
- (1999) "Making sense of Emergence", Philosophical Studies 95, pp. 3–36.
- (2005) Physicalism, or Something Near Enough, Princeton University Press (Chapter 1).
- (2006) Philosophy of Mind, 2nd ed., Westview Press.
- (2010) Essays in the Metaphysics of Mind, Oxford University Press

== See also ==
- American philosophy
- List of Korean philosophers
- McClamrock, Ron
