= Interactionism (philosophy of mind) =

Theory in the philosophy of mind

Interactionism or interactionist dualism is the theory in the philosophy of mind which holds that matter and mind are two distinct and independent substances that exert causal effects on one another. An example of your mind influencing your body would be if you are depressed (which is related to your mind), you can observe the effects on your body, such as a slouched posture, a lackluster smile, etc. Another example, this time of your body affecting your mind would be: If you struck your toe very forcefully on a door (which is related to your body), you would experience terrible pain (which is related to your mind). Interactionism is one type of dualism, traditionally a type of substance dualism though more recently also sometimes a form of property dualism. Many philosophers and scientists have responded to this theory with arguments both supporting and opposing its relevance to life and whether the theory corresponds to reality.

== Proponents ==
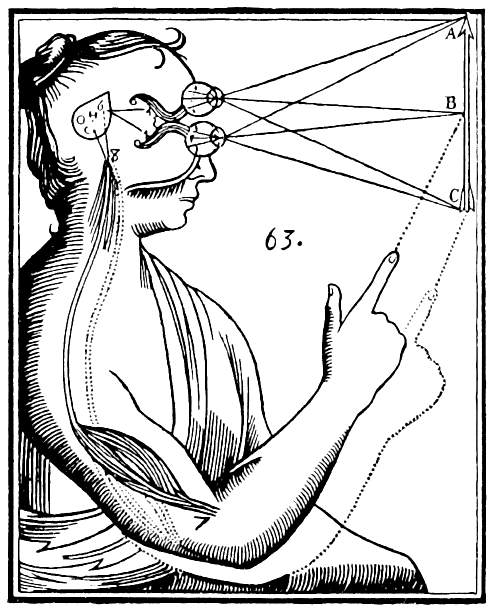
René Descartes's illustration of dualism. Inputs are passed on by the sensory organs to the epiphysis in the brain and from there to the immaterial spirit.

=== René Descartes ===
Interactionism was propounded by the French rationalist philosopher René Descartes (1596–1650), and continues to be associated with him. Descartes posited that the body, being physical matter, was characterized by spatial extension but not by thought and feeling, while the mind, being a separate substance, had no spatial extension but could think and feel. Nevertheless, he maintained that the two interacted with one another, suggesting that this interaction occurred in the pineal gland of the brain.

=== Development of interactionism ===
In the 20th century, its most significant defenders have been the noted philosopher of science Karl Popper and the neurophysiologist John Carew Eccles. Popper, in fact, divided reality into three "worlds"—the physical, the mental, and objective knowledge (outside the mind)—all of which interact, and Eccles adopted this same "trialist" form of interactionism. Other notable recent philosophers to take an interactionist stance have been Richard Swinburne, John Foster, David Hodgson, and Wilfrid Sellars, in addition to the physicist Henry Stapp.

Avshalom Elitzur has described himself as a "reluctant dualist". One argument Elitzur makes in favor of dualism is an argument from bafflement. According to Elitzur, a conscious being can conceive of a P-zombie version of his/herself. However, a P-zombie cannot conceive of a version of itself that lacks corresponding qualia.

In his 1996 book The Conscious Mind, David Chalmers questioned interactionism. In 2002 he listed it along with epiphenomenalism and what he calls "Type-F Monism" as a position worth examining. Rather than invoking two distinct substances, he defines interactionism as the view that "microphysics is not causally closed, and that phenomenal properties play a causal role in affecting the physical world." (See property dualism.) He argues the most plausible place for consciousness to impact physics is the collapse of the wave function in quantum mechanics.

The New Catholic Encyclopedia argues that a non-physical mind and mind–body interaction follow necessarily from the Catholic doctrines of the soul and free will.

== Objections ==
=== Problem of causal interaction ===
Today the problem of causal interaction is frequently viewed as a conclusive argument against interactionism. On the other hand, it has been suggested that given many disciplines deal with things they do not entirely understand, dualists not entirely understanding the mechanism of mind–body interaction need not be seen as definitive refutation. The idea that causation necessarily depends on push-pull mechanisms (which would not be possible for a substance that did not occupy space) is also arguably based on obsolete conceptions of physics.

==== Objection from Princess Elizabeth of Bohemia ====
One objection often posed to interactionism is the problem of causal interaction – how the two different substances the theory posits, the mental and the physical, can exert an impact on one another. This objection was initially made by Elisabeth, Princess of Bohemia and is known as Princess Elisabeth's objection. She questions how an immaterial substance (mind) can interact with a material substance (body) given that they cannot make physical contact. An example of a physical-physical interaction is how when a cue ball hits another billiards ball, it causes it to move. Princess Elisabeth questioned how a mental occurrence, such as intention, can cause a finger to move if immaterial things never come into direct contact with the physical world.

Elizabeth of Bohemia's objection is part of the "pairing problem", a point raised by the philosopher Jaegwon Kim that Amy Kind also mentions in her book. The pairing problem objects the Cartesian dualism more particularly interactionism by questioning the possibility of the interaction of immaterial things such as the mind with material things such as the body by showing the difficulty of doing so. The argument that Jaegwon Kim presents supporting the pairing problem says that it is not possible to give a causal explanation to an event between two immaterial entities or an event between an immaterial and a physical entity. As a response to Elizabeth of Bohemia's objections, Descartes asserts that the mind–body relationship is misunderstood. As a counterargument to his critics, he drew an analogy between the mind and gravity, stating that if gravity can have an effect on a material body without physical contact, then the mind can also have an effect on the body. Elizabeth of Bohemia found Descartes's response unsatisfactory because, according to her, the analogy of gravitation explains what occurs between mind and body but does not help us understand how immaterial entities interact with material entities. Elizabeth of Bohemia finds that Descartes's explanations does not explain how the mind associates itself with the body in order to be able to do things such as physical movements of particular body parts. Eventually, after a few correspondences, Descartes's response became more evasive and was deviated on other topics such as the Princess's misconceptions and her health. Despite the fact that Elizabeth of Bohemia is remembered as a critic of René Descartes, she agrees with him on a few points, such as the principle of interactionism meaning the fact that the mind and body can influence each other. In addition to that, she appreciates his reasoning and believes she can learn and expand her knowledge from it.

==== Occasionalism ====
Descartes' theory that interaction between the mind and the physical world occurred in the pineal gland was seen as inadequate by a number of philosophers in his era, who offered alternate views: Nicholas Malebranche suggested occasionalism, according to which mind and body appear to interact but are in fact moved separately by God, while Gottfried Leibniz argued in The Monadology that mind and body are in a pre-established harmony. On the other hand, Baruch Spinoza rejected Descartes' dualism and proposed that mind and matter were in fact properties of a single substance, thereby prefiguring the modern perspective of neutral monism.

The problem of mental causation is also discussed in the context of other positions on the mind–body problem, such as property dualism and anomalous monism.

=== Compatibility with the conservation of energy ===
A more recent related objection is the argument from physics, which claims that a mental substance impacting the physical world would contradict principles of physics. In particular, if some external source of energy is responsible for the interactions, it would violate the law of conservation of energy. Two main responses to this have been to suggest the mind influences the distribution but not the quantity of energy in the brain and to deny that the brain is a causally closed system in which conservation of energy would apply. It could also be argued that the law of conservation of energy is false in systems which realize a mind.

=== Causal closure ===
Taking the argument a step further, it has been argued that because physics fully accounts for the causes of all physical movements, there can be no place for a non-physical mind to play a role. The principle, in slightly different iterations, has variously been called causal closure, completeness of the physical, physical closure, and physical comprehensiveness. This has been the foremost argument against interactionism in contemporary philosophy.

Some philosophers have suggested the influence of the mind on the body could be reconciled with deterministic physical laws by proposing the mind's impacts instead take place at points of quantum indeterminacy. Karl Popper and John Eccles, as well as the physicist Henry Stapp, have theorized that such indeterminacy may apply at the macroscopic scale. (See quantum mind.) However, Max Tegmark has argued that classical and quantum calculations show that quantum decoherence effects do not play a role in brain activity. David Chalmers has noted (without necessarily endorsing) a second possibility within quantum mechanics, that consciousness' causal role is to collapse the wave function, often referred as consciousness causes collapse. He acknowledges this is at odds with the interpretations of quantum mechanics held by most physicists, but notes, "There is some irony in the fact that philosophers reject interactionism on largely physical grounds (it is incompatible with physical theory), while physicists reject an interactionist interpretation of quantum mechanics on largely philosophical grounds (it is dualistic). Taken conjointly, these reasons carry little force...".

There remains a literature in philosophy and science, albeit a much-contested one, that asserts evidence for emergence in various domains, which would undermine the principle of causal closure. (See emergentism.) Another option that has been suggested is that the interaction may involve dark energy, dark matter or some other currently unknown scientific process.

=== Causal overdetermination ===
Another possible resolution is akin to parallelism—Eugene Mills holds that behavioral events are causally overdetermined, and can be explained by either physical or mental causes alone. An overdetermined event is fully accounted for by multiple causes at once. To imagine this argument, Amy Kind refers to a case from Mission Impossible: Rogue Nation, where three snipers each fire a bullet into an Austrian Chancellor's heart. Regardless if the Chancellor was shot with three bullets or one, the outcome was inevitable. This is an example of overdetermination because it states that both mental and physical causes invoke reactions and like the bullets, no matter if there is a physical cause or a mental cause, the outcome is the same. However, J. J. C. Smart and Paul Churchland have argued that if physical phenomena fully determine behavioral events, then by Occam's razor a non-physical mind is unnecessary. Andrew Melnyk argues that overdetermination would require an "intolerable coincidence." However, Vilanayur S. Ramachandran and William Hirstein (1997) argue that Occam's razor is not useful for scientific discovery. They exemplify the above with the discovery of relativity in physics, which was not the product of accepting Occam's razor but rather of rejecting it and asking the question of whether it could be that a deeper generalization, not required by the currently available data, was true and allowed for unexpected predictions. Most scientific discoveries arise, these authors argue, from ontologically promiscuous conjectures that do not come from current data.

While causal closure remains a key obstacle for interactionism, it is not relevant to all forms of dualism; epiphenomenalism and parallelism are unaffected as they do not posit that the mind affects the body.

== Relationship to other positions ==
Four varieties of dualist causal interaction. The arrows indicate the direction of causations. Mental and physical states are shown in red and blue, respectively.

Interactionism can be distinguished from competing dualist theories of causation. Similar to interactionism, epiphenomenalism admits causation but views causation as unidirectional rather than bidirectional. The theory accepts that the mind is affected by the physical body but not vice-versa. Another dualist theory of causation is parallelism which denies causation while seeking to explain the semblance of causation by other means such as pre-established harmony or occasionalism.

In The Conscious Mind, David Chalmers argued that regardless of the mechanism by which the mental might impact the physical if interactionism were true, there was a deeper conceptual issue: the chosen mechanism could always be separated from its phenomenal component, leading to simply a new form of epiphenomenalism. Later, he suggested that while the causal component could be separated, interactionism was like "type-F monism" (Russellian monism, panpsychism, and panprotopsychism) in that it gave entities externally characterized by physical relationships the additional intrinsic feature of conscious properties.

== See also ==
- Qualia
- Hard problem of consciousness
- Philosophical zombie
- Explanatory gap
- Knowledge argument
- Chinese room
- Phenomenal consciousness
- Dual aspect theory
- Idealism
- Biological naturalism
- Identity theory of mind
- Functionalism (philosophy of mind)
- Behaviorism
- Eliminative materialism
- Neuroscience of free will
- Neurophilosophy
- Integrated information theory (IIT)
- Philosophy of science
- Scientism
- Artificial consciousness
- Animal consciousness
