= Moral universalizability =

Philosophical principle

The general concept or principle of moral universalizability is that moral principles, maxims, norms, facts, predicates, rules, etc., are universally true; that is, if they are true as applied to some particular case (an action, person, etc.) then they are true of all other cases of this sort. Some philosophers, like Immanuel Kant, Richard Hare, and Alan Gewirth, have argued that moral universalizability is the foundation of all moral facts. Others have argued that moral universalizability is a necessary, but not a sufficient, test of morality. A few philosophers have also argued that morality is not constrained by universalizability at all.

== Two Moral Universalization Conditions ==
The general concept can be distinguished into two main versions, which can be called universal applicability and universal practice. Any particular universalizability test requires that some criterion be satisfied within this universalizability condition. A universalization condition combined with a specific satisfaction criterion constitutes a universalizability test. The two versions can be modelled in formal logic as:

Universal Applicability (UA):	□(x)CMx
Universal Practice (UP):	□C(x)Mx

where C is a modal operator meaning "criterion C is satisfied by..." and Mx means "agent x practices principle M". Both UP and UA are universalization conditions in virtue of having a universal quantifier, (x), but the role of each is different.

In a UA test, M is only permissible if criterion C is satisfied for each possible individual, in any possible situation or world if she practices (or were to practice) M. In particular, C must be satisfied anytime an individual practices M even if other agents do not practice M. That is, the requirement that M must satisfy C is universally applicable to each possible person's behavior, considered individually.

For a UP test, however, whether C is satisfied when not all persons are doing M is irrelevant; it is only required that C be satisfied whenever it is the case that everyone practices M: that is, in worlds in which M is universally practiced.

== Satisfaction Criteria within the Universalization Conditions ==
In addition to using different universalization conditions, universalizability tests use a variety of different satisfaction criteria. For example, consequentialists typically use criteria like "produces at least as much good as any alternative would" or "has at least as much expected value as any alternative." These tend to be aggregative, allowing the addition of value across different agents. Deontologists tend to use non-aggregative criteria like "is not impossible" (Kant's contradiction in conception test), "would make the satisfaction of your ends impossible" (Kant's contradiction in will test), "would disrespect humanity in yourself or another" (Kant's formula of humanity), or "would be reasonable to reject" (Scanlon's contractualist test).

== Universal Applicability ==
In this condition, a moral predicate (like obligatory, permissible, forbidden, etc.) always applies to a given behavior in virtue of some reason, and whenever the same reason is present, the same predicate applies.

=== Moral Supervenience ===
According to the principle of moral supervenience, moral properties of actions (obligatory, permissible, forbidden, etc.) supervene on—that is, depend upon or are functions of—non-moral properties. The principle itself does not specify which moral properties these are, so it does not constitute a universalizability test. However it is often considered a necessary feature of any moral truth, and hence is often thought to rule out certain general theories of morality (see meta-ethics), even if it cannot forbid many particular actions.

=== In Act Consequentialism ===
In a series of books, R.M. Hare (who introduced the term into philosophical literature) made moral supervenience the basis of his derivation of a version of utilitarianism, but this was actually a universal applicability condition combined with the criterion that the universalized behavior would not produce a greater balance of satisfied over frustrated preferences of all affected agents (including animal agents as well as persons) than any alternative behavior would. Other act consequentialists also use versions of this argument, often expressing this in terms of the golden rule or the universality of reasons, where this is described as a universal applicability condition. J.S. Mill was also an act consequentialist, using the universal applicability condition and rejecting the universal practice condition as part of any fundamental moral principle, although he thought that the results of everyone's acting the same way was a useful guide for determining when an individual act was likely to produce good consequences.

=== In Colloquial Moral Thought ===
The universal applicability condition is also embodied in the colloquial question, "How would you like it if somebody else did that to you?" Here, the presumption is that the behavior in question causes some harm or offense to other people, even though it may benefit or please the person performing it. When the person reflects upon how someone else's performance of the same behavior might harm herself, she finds she cannot approve of this, which suggests that if she is consistent she should also disapprove of herself doing it, judging it morally wrong. The question is imprecise in that it does not specify exactly what effects of the behavior would be grounds for considering it impermissible, and therefore, like the principle of moral supervenience, does not specify a complete universalizability test. Likewise, the phrase "What's good (or: is sauce) for the goose is good (sauce) for the gander," suggesting that minor, irrelevant differences do not affect the permissibility of some behavior, so if it is permissible for one person (the "goose") then it is also permissible for any very similar person (a "gander")-with the implication that if someone rejects the second judgment, they must either explain why the different between the two cases is morally relevant, or retract their judgment of the first case.

=== In Alan Gewirth ===
Alan Gewirth uses a universal applicability condition in his "principle of generic consistency," combining this with the criterion that the effects of an action may not deny to any other person the necessary conditions of their successful agency, most notably including "freedom and well-being."

=== In Kantian Ethics ===
The 18th-century German philosopher Immanuel Kant's second formulation of a categorical imperative or fundamental moral principle, the formula of humanity as an end in itself, uses a UA condition. It requires all persons to always respect humanity in oneself or another as an end in itself. Always presumably means: in any possible situation, and hence implicitly invokes a UA condition: even if one instance of a behavior is not disrespectful, if some other possible instance of it would be disrespectful, then we must follow a principle of avoiding it in the latter type of case.

== Universal Practice ==
In this condition, a behavior is permissible if and only if its universal practice by all persons necessarily satisfies some criterion. An imagined world in which everyone in it conform to the same kind of behavior is often called an "ideal world," and so moral or political theories appealing to it are sometimes called "ideal theories" as opposed to "non-ideal theories." This should not be taken to mean that the former theories are themselves more ideal or better than the latter by definition; the ideality in question refers to the worlds the theories describe, are based on, or intended to apply to, not necessarily to how well they describe moral facts and obligations in the actual world, which is much disputed.

=== General Problems of Universal Practice Tests ===
For many behaviors, universalizability tests using the same satisfaction criteria but different universalization conditions will reach the same conclusion. For instance, if every person's M-ing causes the same amount of harm and good as anyone else's, no matter what anyone else does, then the total effect of everyone's M-ing will be the effect of one person's M-ing multiplied by the number of persons; if the criterion is that the effect cause no more harm than good, then the same behaviors will satisfy or fail this criterion under either universalization condition we use. However some behaviors cause different amounts of harm depending upon how many other people are performing them. For these behaviors, universal practice tests generally give counter-intuitive, and often quite harmful recommendations, for cases in which not everyone else is doing the same thing we are doing. This occurs in two general kinds of cases: responding to evil-doers, and solving coordination problems. Together they are typically called "partial compliance" problems, because they deal with the question of what would be a morally correct response to a situation where other persons are not doing the same thing you are doing (or considering doing).

The first is illustrated by a disposition to complete pacifism. In any world where everyone is pacifistic, little harm is done, so it passes most universal practice tests. But in a realistic world containing many non-pacifists, an individual's commitment to complete pacifism is likely to not only make him a victim of evil-doers, but unable to defend innocent third parties from the latter, resulting in much greater harm than a more complex conditional disposition, like "be pacifist only if all others are pacifistic, but defend yourself and others from aggression if necessary."

The second is exemplified by the need to choose which side of the road to drive on. A rule of always driving on the left passes most universal practice tests. It follows that such tests permit such behavior—even if not everyone else has chosen this option. Of course, the rule of always driving on the right, as well as the more intuitively plausible rule of driving on whatever side conforms to local custom or law, also passes such tests. So while such tests permit such intuitively plausible rules, they also permit some which will lead to catastrophe in a world where not everyone has picked the same permissible rule. Hence, like the rule of absolute pacifism, such a rule will typically pass a universal practice test, but fails a universal applicability test, because while everyone's following the rule is not harmful, its practice by some persons while some other people are not doing so does produce significant harm. Any behavior condemned by a universal practice test will also be condemned by a universal approval test using the same satisfaction criteria, so the latter is always at least as strong as the former.

A variety of proposals have been made to try to rescue universal practice tests from these implications, but none have been universally considered successful.

=== In Colloquial Moral Thought ===
The UP condition is expressed by the colloquial question "What if everybody did that?" Like the colloquial "somebody" question above, it leaves unstated precisely what result of everyone's performance of the behavior would make this result unacceptable and hence make the behavior wrong.

=== In Kantian Ethics ===
Immanuel Kant's first formulation of the categorical imperative, the "Formula of Universal Law," as well as his third "Kingdom of Ends" formulation, also use a universal practice condition. The first formula states that the only morally acceptable maxims of our actions are those that could rationally be willed to practiced as a universal law, or in a variant "Law of Nature" formulation, one whose practice by all persons we could will to have been a law of nature (and hence necessarily governing the behavior of all persons throughout all time and space). Kant appealed to two criteria which must be satisfied under such a condition: first, the universalization must be conceivable, and second that this universalization will not necessarily frustrate the ends of any agent practicing the maxim (and hence such an agent can both will his own practice of the maxim, and its practice by all other agents). The first is violated by maxims, e.g., of always lying or making false promises, for if (per impossibile) everyone did the same thing, no one would even consider any form of words given by another to count as a statement or promise, so it would be impossible to even try to make such statements with the intent to deceive. The second is violated by maxims, e.g., of never helping another person in need, for while we could imagine a world in which no one gave such help to anyone else, no agent could possibly want others to treat him that way, for there are bound to be occasions which the lack of such help will inevitably result in the frustration of the first person's ends-which, by hypothesis, he wills to satisfy.

Kant called the first kind of violation a contradiction in conception, the second a contradiction in will. Like Gewirth's idea of frustrating the necessary conditions of agency, they involve a performative contradiction, because the practice of the maxim by others would undermine one's own attempt to practice it, and willing the former (even when this does not cause others to practice it) is tantamount to willing the frustration of one's own agency. However Kant's Formula of Universal Law only identifies these contradictions in cases where the maxim is universally practiced; for Gewirth they can also occur in cases where some (but not all) persons' performing the behavior would deprive you of the necessary condition of agency.

Defenders of Kant's ethics have often appealed to his second version of the categorical imperative, the formula of humanity, in order to successfully deal with problems involving evil-doers and coordination problems. As noted above, this formula can successfully do so because it involves a universal applicability condition, and hence is sensitive to the harm done by various maxims in non-ideal conditions even if their universal practice is harmless.

=== In Rule Consequentialism ===
Another moral theory using a universal practice test is rule consequentialism, or more precisely that version of it sometimes called ideal rule consequentialism, where a moral rule is permissible if and only if its practice by all persons would produce at least as much of a balance of good over bad results than the universal practice of any other rule would. This theory was first expounded by Jurist John Austin, and defended at greater length by R.F. Harrod in 1936, on the grounds that some behaviors cause more harm when everyone (or almost everyone) else is doing the same thing than in the more common case where not everyone else is doing so; since the harm can get so very bad in such cases, he argued that we should use its effects in this universal practice case to condemn the same behavior even when almost no one else is doing it, and even when it actually causes little or no harm in such cases. He illustrated this with Kant's example of telling a lie, arguing that the practice of lying by many individual people may actually only be modestly harmful, and in some cases may produce more good than the truth, as long as enough truth-tellers are still around to provide a moral example and give us some confidence that we will usually be told the truth (and be believed when we speak); but if everyone lies, then communication becomes impossible, a devastating effect which Harrod thought justified our condemnation of lying even in the normal case where it may cause little or no harm.

This view has been much criticized, however, on the grounds that it involves "rule-worship" which forbids us from performing such behaviors precisely when they are harmless or even beneficial, just because they would be less beneficial in circumstances which we know we are not in, and that an adequate response (justified by a UA test) is to follow the slightly more but not unmanageable complex rule of usually telling the truth, but lying just when doing so will definitely produce more good than telling the truth. Considerations of the aforementioned need to handle evil-doers has also motivated some defenders of ideal rule consequentialism to suggest modified versions which permit only rules which produce at least as great a balance of good over bad results when 90% (or some other fraction) of any given population practice it, which requires us to follow rules which contain provisions for how to respond to the 10% (criminals, etc.) who may be violating the rules in question. Such proposals have in turn been criticized as a 90% practice level is just as arbitrary as a 100% practice level for the test condition, which can be avoided by appealing to a "variable-rate" test condition where the rule must be optimal regardless of the fraction of the population following it. These proposals in effect abandon the universal practice condition for the universal applicability condition.

=== In Other Moral Theories ===
Other versions of a universal practice test are found in M.G. Singer's "generalization argument", and J. Habermas's "principle U". These have each in turn been occasionally criticized for their inability to handle non-ideal cases

== Bibliography ==
- Cummiskey, David (1996). Kantian Consequentialism. Oxford University Press.
- Forschler, Scott (2017). "Universal Practice and Universal Applicability Tests in Modern Moral Theory". Philosophical Studies. 174. Springer: 3041–3058. doi:10.1007/s11098-016-0845-6. S2CID 254937566.
- Gibbard, Allan (1965). "Rule-Utilitarianism: Merely an Illusory Alternative?". Australasian Journal of Philosophy. 43 (2). Taylor & Francis: 211–20. doi:10.1080/00048406512341181.
- Habermas, Jürgen (1981). The Theory of Communicative Action, v1: Reason and the Rationalization of Society. Translated by Thomas McCarthy. Beacon Press.
- Hardin, Russell (1988). Morality Within the Limits of Reason. University of Chicago Press.
- Harrison, Jonathan (1985). "Utilitarianism, Universalization, Heteronomy, and Necessity, or UnKantian Ethics". In Nelson Potter and Mark Timmons (ed.). Morality and Universality: Essays on Ethical Universalizability. D. Reidel. pp. 237–266.
- Hare, R.M. (1963). Freedom and Reason. Clarendon Press.
- Hare, R.M. (1981). Moral Thinking: Its Levels, Method, and Point. Clarendon Press.
- Harrod, R. F. (1936). "Utilitarianism Revised". Mind. 45 (178). Springer: 137–156. doi:10.1093/mind/xlv.178.137.
- Kant, Immanuel (1785). Groundwork of the Metaphysics of Morals – via Wikisource. Volume and page numbers to the standard Prussian Academy edition of Kant's works are used in this article.
- Mill, John Stuart (1972). The Collected Works of John Stuart Mill, volume 17 (The Later Letters). University of Toronto Press.
- Moore, G.E. (1903). Principia Ethica. Cambridge University Press.
- Scanlon, Thomas Michael (1988). What We Owe To Each Other. Belknap Press.
- Sharp, Frank Chapman (1928). Ethics. Century Co.
- Singer, Peter (1981). The Expanding Circle: Ethics and Sociobiology. Farrar, Straus & Giroux.
- Singer, Peter (1993). Practical Ethics. Cambridge University Press.
- Smart, John Jamieson Carswell (1973). "An Outline of a System of Utilitarian Ethics". In John Jamieson Carswell Smart and Bernard Williams. (ed.). Utilitarianism: For and Against. Cambridge University Press. pp. 3-74. ISBN 052109822X.
- Tobia, Kevin (2013). "Rule Consequentialism and the Problem of Partial Acceptance". Ethical Theory and Moral Practice. 16 (3): 643–652. doi:10.1007/s10677-012-9382-3. S2CID 254463890.
