= Moral supervenience =

Concept in meta-ethics

The principle of moral supervenience states that moral predicates supervene upon non-moral predicates, and hence that moral facts involving these predicates supervene upon non-moral facts. The moral facts are hence said to be supervenient facts, and the non-moral facts the supervenience base of the former. Moral facts could be about actions, character traits, or situations, e.g., stealing is wrong, Alice is virtuous, or Shane's suffering was morally bad.

== Clarification and examples ==
Another way to put this is to say that moral facts are a function of, depend upon, or are constrained or constituted by, some non-moral facts, and that the latter are a sufficient condition for making the moral facts true. It follows that any change in moral facts must be accompanied by a change in the non-moral facts (i.e., those on which it supervenes), but that the reverse is not the case. A moral fact can supervene on more than one set of non-moral facts-i.e., it is multiply realizable-but any given set of non-moral facts determines the moral facts which supervene upon it.

Not all non-moral predicates need be relevant to the application of a moral predicate. For instance, whether a particular killing was done in self-defense or in order to facilitate a robbery may be relevant to whether it is wrong. But most people would think that whether it happens in Greenland or England, or in the morning or at night, or by someone named Brenda or Sam, are not relevant to it is wrong. The principle of moral supervenience does not tell us which such facts are relevant, only that whichever ones are relevant, they are relevant wherever they appear. Hence it is considered a very weak constraint on morality.

=== Restrictions on Non-Moral Predicates ===
The principle is sometimes qualified to say that moral facts supervene upon natural facts, i.e., observable, empirical facts within space-time, but a broader conception could allow the supervenience base to include any non-moral facts, including (if there are any) non-natural facts (e.g., divine commands, Platonic truths).

R.M. Hare claimed that the supervenience base of a moral fact could not include "individual constants" (including proper names of persons, countries, etc.) This may be related to the above distinction if proper names cannot be reduced to any natural facts about the being named. For instance, being John Smith is not identical to being called John Smith or having DNA code GCATTC..., since someone else could also be named John Smith, or have his DNA (e.g., an identical twin or clone).

=== Relationship to Moral Particularism ===
Hare, in the first recorded usage of the term moral particularism, defined it as incompatible with moral supervenience, saying they were contradictories. However he defined moral particularism as the possibility that two persons committing acts with the same natural properties could have different moral properties simply because the acts were done by different persons, which is simply the denial of moral supervenience as he understood it.) Contemporary moral particularists instead hold the view that, even if some properties make a certain act wrong, it is possible that if it also had additional properties, the act would be right. For instance, Brenda killing Charles would normally be wrong, but might be right if Brenda was escaping from Charles, who had kidnapped her, and yet might be wrong again if Charles kidnapped her to prevent her from committing an act of terrorism, and so forth. In each case, it is a further non-moral property which changes the moral property of the act, which is compatible with moral supervenience.

== History ==
Moral supervenience is a kind of moral universalizability principle, like the Golden Rule or Immanuel Kant's categorical imperative, so the underlying idea may be as old as the golden rule. Moral supervenience differs from most other universalizability principles in that it adds no specific criterion for the supervenience base of permissible behaviors, so it cannot function as a comprehensive test for moral permissibility, as most other universalizability principles purport to do.

The earliest precise specification of the principle may be found in Samuel Clarke's "Rule of Equity" according to which "Whatever I judge reasonable or unreasonable that another should do for me: that by the same judgment I declare reasonable or unreasonable that I should in the like case do for him." William Wollaston echoed this claim with the principle that "Whatever is either reasonable or unreasonable in B with respect to C, would be just the same in C with respect to B, if the case was inverted. Because reason is universal and respects cases, not persons." Richard Cumberland stated it as a requirement of "right reason," which entailed that “It is included in the notion of a true proposition, (a practical one, for instance,) and is consequently a necessary perfection of a man forming a right judgment in that affair; that it should agree with other true propositions framed about a like subject, tho that case should happen at another time, or belong to another man.... Whoever therefore judges truly, must judge the same things, which he thinks truly are lawful to himself, to be lawful in others in a like case. " Later versions are found in Reid, Moore, Sidgwick, and Sharp.

The first usage of the general term "supervenience" and the specific term "moral supervenience" in print was by R.M. Hare, although he later suggested that the former term was used by other philosophers conversationally before he put them both into print. While Hare was primarily interested in the supervenience of moral concepts on non-moral ones, he also argued that other evaluative concepts, e.g., aesthetic ones like beautiful, pleasant, nice, etc., must also supervene upon non-moral facts. For instance, it is senseless to call one room "nice" and another "not nice" unless there is some underlying difference between them describable in non-aesthetic terms (like the arrangement of the furniture, color of the walls, etc.) If the two rooms are identical in all their non-aesthetic properties, then they must also be identical in their aesthetic ones.

In a series of later books, Hare made moral supervenience, combined with the criterion that a rational being would prefer the satisfaction of his preferences over their frustration, the basis of his idea of universal prescriptivism. From this he derived a version of utilitarianism, by arguing that to prescribe a particular action in one's circumstances was only rational if you would prescribe anyone's else's doing it, even if you were equally likely to be any agent (including all those affected, for good or ill, by the action). This would only be true if, were you to personally experience all the good and bad effects of the action upon all affected persons (i.e., the satisfaction and frustration of their preferences), you would not prefer some other action to the one in question. He often simply called moral supervenience "universalizability" and equated it with Kant's principle of universal law, although the two are not the same (see moral universalizability).

== Bibliography ==
- Clarke, Samuel (1964) [First published 1705]. "The Evidences of Natural and Revealed Religion, Boyle Lectures". A Demonstration of the Being and Attributes of God; Discourse Concerning the Unchangeable Obligations of Natural Religion. Friedrich Frommann Verlag.
- Cumberland, Richard (2005) [First published 1727]. A Treatise of the Laws of Nature. Translated by John Maxwell. Liberty Fund.
- Hare, R.M. (1952). The Language of Morals. Clarendon Press.
- Hare, R.M. (1963). Freedom and Reason. Clarendon Press.
- Hare, R.M. (1981). Moral Thinking: Its Levels, Method, and Point. Clarendon Press.
- Hare, R.M. (1989). Essays in Ethical Theory. Clarendon Press.
- Hare, R.M. (1997). "Could Kant have been a utilitarian?". In Sorting out ethics. Clarendon Press. pp. 147–165.
- McPherson, Tristam (2015). "Supervenience in Ethics". Stanford Encyclopedia of Philosophy.
- Moore, G.E. (1903). Principia Ethica. Cambridge University Press.
- Reid, Thomas (2011) [First published 1788]. Essays on the Active Powers of Man. Cambridge University Press.
- Sharp, Frank Chapman (1928). Ethics. Century Co.
- Sidgwick, Henry (1966) [First published 1907]. The Methods of Ethics. Dover.
- Wollaston, William (1974) [First published 1724]. The Religion of Nature Delineated. Scholars’ Facsimiles & Reprints.
