= Ron McClamrock =

American philosopher

Ronald Albert McClamrock is an associate professor of philosophy at the University at Albany, The State University of New York. His primary areas of research are the philosophy of mind, philosophy of science, and cognitive science.

== Existential cognition ==
In his book, Existential Cognition: Minds in the World, McClamrock argued for the extreme importance of the external environment (both social and physical) in the determination of almost all varieties of human and animal behavior. His position is that the methodological individualism inherent in many contemporary forms of computational theories of the mind are completely inadequate and that we must look to the interactions between organism and world in order to find "external mechanisms that mediate behavior" as well as the usual internal mechanisms. Borrowing from Herbert A. Simon and also influenced by the ideas of existential phenomenologists such as Maurice Merleau-Ponty and Martin Heidegger, McClamrock suggests that man's condition of being-in-the-world makes it impossible for him to understand himself by abstracting away from it and examining it as if it were a detached experimental object of which he himself is not an integral part.

However, unlike the continental philosophers, McClamrock relies upon results from modern information sciences, biology and cognitive science to support his conclusions about the bounded and embedded nature of consciousness and the mind as a whole. One of his examples, taken from David Marr, discusses the exploitation of local environmental regularities in the control mechanisms of the common fly.

"Flies, it turns out, don't quite know that to fly they should flap their wings. They don't take off by sending some signal from the brain to the wings. There is a direct control link from the fly's feet to its wings such that when the feet cease to be in contact with a surface, the fly's wings begin to flap. To take off, the fly simply jumps and then lets the signal from the feet trigger the wings.

The local surface mediates the signal from brain to wings, illustrating the point that the human nervous system may be said, in a certain sense, to extend to parts of its external environment.

In another example, McClamrock cites the case of a man driving from one destination to another. On the way, he encounters various external signals and stimuli (street names, direction signs, people who provide information when asked, landmarks, etc..) and all of these help him, in many cases are indispensable to, his successfully finding his way from point A to point B. The path he ends up traveling to get to point B from point A is, in any case, partially determined by his environment. In the case of ants, this is even clearer. When we look at the tracks that ants make as a result of their movements, they seemed to be highly ordered and preplanned. But, in fact, an ant will usually encounter unforeseen and unforeseeable obstacles as it makes its way along from one point to another. At each obstacle, it will be constrained to make a choice that it otherwise wouldn't. The path that it ultimately travels will therefore be heavily determined by its exterior environment, as well its behavior.

== Argument against Kim ==
McClamrock's article "Emergence Unscathed: Kim on Non-Reducible Types" took on Jaegwon Kim's famous "causal powers" argument against multiple realizability. Kim argued that multiple realizability conflicts with fundamental constraints on the definition of kinds and with general rules of scientific taxonomy. Kim's argument is based on two essential premises:

The Causal Inheritance Principle: if mental property M is realized in a system at time t in virtue of physical realization base P, the causal powers of M are identical with the causal powers of P.

From this it follows that:

Instances of M that are realized by the same physical base must be grouped under one kind, since the physical base is a causal kind, and instances of M with different realization bases must be grouped under distinct kinds.

The second premise is

The Principle of the Causal Individuation of Kinds: kinds in science are individuated on the basis of their causal powers.

From all of this, it follows, according to Kim, that "if mental kinds are multiply realizable, then they are disqualified as proper scientific kinds...because they are realized by diverse physical causal kinds."

McClamrock flatly rejected Kim's claim that "instances of M that are realized by the same physical base must be grouped under one kind". It is a consequence of token materialism that a complete specification of the causal powers of a mental kind at a certain time will be a complete specification of the causal powers of the physical state which implements it. But Kim's assertion only follows if we assume that the only specification of causal kinds can be in terms of causal powers of tokens. McClamrock suggested understanding higher-level causal powers as simply more general and abstract characterizations of the lower-level causal powers implemented in the physical structure of a system. There are many varieties of causal taxonomy classifying things according to various kinds of causal powers they possess. For example, a taxonomy of orbiting bodies may specify the causal powers of objects in terms of mass, position and velocity – abstracting from the body's chemical composition, geology or microbiotic agglomerations. Such an abstract and incomplete characterization of the causal powers of a system makes it possible to group together physically type-distinct instances of the higher-level kind (in this case, planets, stars and other orbiting bodies).

Moreover, taxonomies in computer science are typically characterized by such abstractions. What is of interest at the level of information processing are such things as registers and microprogramming operations, not the causal powers of the material structure of semiconductors.

== Works ==
- "Holism without tears: Local and global effects in cognitive processes", Philosophy of Science. 1989.
- "Marr's three levels: A re-evaluation", Minds and Machines. 1991.
- "Irreducibility and subjectivity", Philosophical Studies. 1992.
- "Emergence unscathed: Kim on multiple realizability and causal types", Electronic Journal of Analytic Philosophy. 1992.
- "Methodological individualism considered as a constitutive principle of scientific inquiry", Philosophical Psychology. 1992.
- "Functional analysis and etiology", Erkenntnis. 1993.
- (with Bonnie Steinbock), "When is birth unfair to the child?", in Hastings Center Report. 1994.
- Existential Cognition: Computational Minds in the World. University of Chicago Press. 1995.
- "Screening off and the levels of selection", Erkenntnis. 1996.
- "Modularity", in The Encyclopedia of Cognitive Science. 2003.
