= Alyssa Ney =

American philosopher of science

Alyssa Ney is an American philosopher of science, and a professor and chair of metaphysics at the Faculty of Philosophy, Philosophy of Science, and Religious Studies at LMU Munich. Her interests include metaphysics, the philosophy of physics, and the philosophy of mind.

== Education and career ==
Ney majored in physics and philosophy at Tulane University, graduating in 1999. She then went to Brown University for graduate study in philosophy, earning a master's degree in 2003 and completing her Ph.D. in 2005. Her dissertation, The Metaphysics of Unified Science, was supervised by Jaegwon Kim. Later, as a philosophy professor, she earned a second master's degree in physics from the University of California, Davis in 2020.

She worked at the University of Rochester as an assistant professor from 2005, subsequently becoming James P. Wilmot Assistant Professor and, in 2011, associate professor. She joined the University of California, Davis in 2015 and was promoted to full professor in 2019. She moved to LMU Munich in 2024.

In 2022, she became one of the founding editors of the journal Philosophy of Physics.

== Books ==
Ney's books include:

- Metaphysics: An Introduction (Routledge, 2014; 2nd ed., 2023)
- The World in the Wave Function: A Metaphysics for Quantum Physics (Oxford University Press, 2021)

With David Albert, she is co-editor of The Wave Function: Essays in the Metaphysics of Quantum Mechanics (Oxford University Press, 2013).
