= Problem of mental causation =

Conceptual issue in the philosophy of mind

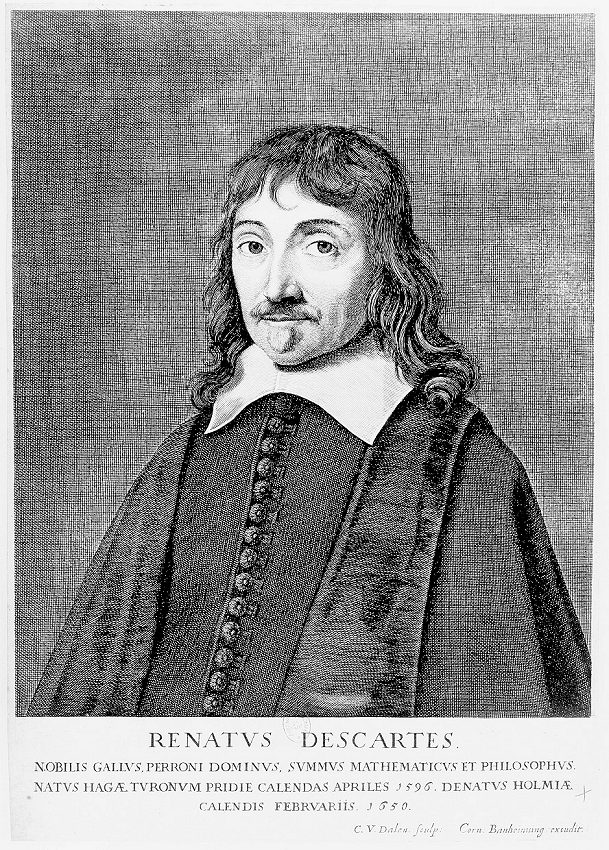
René Descartes (1596-1650)

The problem of mental causation is a conceptual issue in the philosophy of mind. That problem, in short, is how to account for the common sense idea that intentional thoughts or intentional mental states are causes of intentional actions. The problem divides into several distinct sub-problems, including the problem of causal exclusion, the problem of anomalism, and the problem of externalism. However, the sub-problem which has attracted most attention in the philosophical literature is arguably the exclusion problem.

== Description ==
The basic problem of mental causation is an intuitive one: on the face of it, it seems that mental events cause physical events (and vice versa), but how can mental events have any causal effect on physical events? Suppose that a person, John, orders dessert after dinner. It seems that at least one cause for such a physical, behavioral event is that John desired to have dessert and believed that by ordering dessert he would be able to soon have dessert. But, how can such mental events as beliefs and desires cause John's mouth to move in such a way that he orders dessert?

== Sub-problems of mental causation ==
=== Exclusion problem ===
What follows is a summary of the causal exclusion problem in its simplest form, and it is merely one of several possible formulations.

To the extent that we do not have to go outside human physiology in order to trace the causal antecedents of any bodily movement, intentional action can be fully causally explained by the existence of these physiological antecedents alone. No mention of mental states need enter into the explanation. This troubles philosophers because intuitively it seems that mental states are crucial in causing a person to act (for example, their beliefs and desires). But, given that physiological facts are sufficient to account for action, mental states appear to be superfluous; they are at risk of being causally and explanatorily irrelevant with respect to human action (Yoo 2006, p. §3b.iii).

Many philosophers consider this apparent irrelevance to be a highly counter-intuitive and undesirable position to take. It ultimately leads to epiphenomenalism—the view that mental events or states are causally irrelevant, they are merely after effects that play no role in any causal chains whatsoever. Thomas Huxley famously noted that epiphenomenalism treats mental states like the steam coming off a train: it plays no causal role in the train's moving forward, it is merely an "emergent property" of the actual causation occurring in the engine (Walter 2003, p. §2).

=== Problem of anomalism ===
Another problem with mental causation is that mental events seem anomalous in the sense that there are no scientific laws that mental states can figure into without having exceptions. There are no "strict" laws, and mental events must factor into strict laws in order to fit respectably into the causal order described by current science [see (Davidson 1970)].

In short, one response has been to deny that psychological laws involving mental states require strict, exceptionless laws. Jerry Fodor argues that non-basic (or "special") sciences do not in fact require strict laws (Fodor 1980). In current practice, special sciences (for example, biology and chemistry) have ceteris paribus laws (or laws with "all else being equal" clauses), according to which there are exceptions. However, only in the basic sciences (physics) are there strict, exceptionless laws. Thus, although mental states are anomalous, they can still figure into scientifically respectable laws of psychology.

=== Problem of externalism ===
In the latter half of the twentieth century externalism about meanings became espoused by many philosophers. Externalism is roughly the view that certain parts of an individual's environment play a crucial role in the meaning of at least some of an individual's words [see (Putnam 1975) and (Burge 1979)]. A thesis about meaning affects the mind insofar as our thoughts are about things in the world. A common view in the philosophy of mind is that at least certain mental states have intentional content in this sense. For example, one's belief that water is wet has the semantic content of water is wet. The thought is about water and the fact that it is wet. But, if externalism is true—if some of the contents of one's thoughts are constituted at least in part by factors external to one's mind—then there is yet another difficulty in explaining how mental states can cause physical states (Yoo 2006, p. §3b.ii)].

== Traditional solutions ==
=== Dualist solutions ===
Some have claimed that while the mental and the physical are quite different things, they can nonetheless causally interact with one another, a view going back to Descartes [(Descartes & 1642/1986), especially meditations II & VI]. This view is known as interactionist dualism. The major problem that interactionist dualism faces is that of explicating a satisfactory notion of causation according to which non-spatial events, such as mental events, can causally interact with physical events. According to the current mainstream scientific world-view, the physical realm is causally closed, in that causal relationships only hold among physical events in the physical realm. Given these types of considerations, some argue that it is appropriate to say that the main assumptions in interactionist dualism generate the problem of mental causation rather than solve it (see (Yoo 2006, p. §1a).

=== Physicalist solutions ===
The other major option is to assert that mental events are either (at least contingently) identical to physical events, or supervene on physical events. Views that fall under this general heading are called physicalism or materialism. But, such views require a particular theory to explain how mental events are physical in nature. One such theory is behaviorism. Behaviorists, in general, argue that mental events are merely dispositions to behave in certain ways. Another theory is the identity theory, according to which mental events are (either type- or token-) identical to physical events. A more recent view, known as functionalism, claims that mental events are individuated (or constituted by) the causal role they play. As such, mental events would fit directly into the causal realm, as they are simply certain causal (or functional) roles.

=== Idealist solutions ===
==== Popper's three-world formulation ====
Related to dualism above, a more general and somewhat differently posed approach to mental causation is provided by Karl Popper's three worlds. Popper split the world into three categories:

1. The world of physical objects and events, including biological entities
2. The mental or psychological world, the world of our feelings of pain and of pleasure, of our thoughts, of our decisions, of our perceptions and our observations; in other words, the world of mental or psychological states or processes, or of subjective experiences.
3. The world of products of the human mind, including art, science, and religion.

World 3 includes physical theory as a particular case. But World 3 is a creation of the human imagination, and such acts of imagination are a part of World 2. Accordingly, one could argue that the physical notion of causality is a child of the imagination, and although causation has its successes in describing World 1, it may not apply to World 2 or World 3. The subjective aspects of theories contained in World 3 are not readily framed within the third-person perspective of science used to explain World 1.

From this perspective, it is hubris to suppose that the methods successful in describing World 1, in particular to suppose the notions of cause and effect, invented by World 2 in its creation of the theory of World 3 used to explain World 1, have direct application to Worlds 2 and 3 themselves, and control mental agency.

==== Psychological nativism ====
A still different approach to mental causation is based upon the philosophies of Kant, Chomsky and Pinker. These philosophers stress the impact of built-in aspects of mind, studied in the field of psychological nativism.

Immanuel Kant (1724–1804) pointed out that we all shape our experience of things through the filter of our mind, a view sometimes called epistemological solipsism. The mind shapes that experience, and among other things, Kant believed the concepts of space and time were programmed into the human brain, as was the notion of cause and effect. We never have direct experience of things, the noumenal world, and what we do experience is the phenomenal world as conveyed by our senses, this conveyance processed by the machinery of the mind and nervous system. Kant focused upon this processing. Kant believed in a priori knowledge arrived at independent of experience, so-called synthetic a priori knowledge. In particular, he thought that by introspection some aspects of the filtering mechanisms of the mind/brain/nervous system could be discovered. The following observations summarize Kant's views upon the subject-object problem, called Kant's Copernican revolution:

"It has hitherto been assumed that our cognition must conform to the objects; but all attempts to ascertain anything about these objects a priori, by means of conceptions, and thus to extend the range of our knowledge, have been rendered abortive by this assumption. Let us then make the experiment whether we may not be more successful in metaphysics, if we assume that the objects must conform to our cognition. This appears, at all events, to accord better with the possibility of our gaining the end we have in view, that is to say, of arriving at the cognition of objects a priori, of determining something with respect to these objects, before they are given to us. We here propose to do just what Copernicus did in attempting to explain the celestial movements. When he found that he could make no progress by assuming that all the heavenly bodies revolved round the spectator, he reversed the process, and tried the experiment of assuming that the spectator revolved, while the stars remained at rest. We may make the same experiment with regard to the intuition of objects."

— Immanuel Kant, English translation by John Meiklejohn of The Critique of Pure Reason (1. edition 1781, April 23, 1787 Immanuel Kant, Preface to the 2. edition)

Although Kant has posed the issue of built-in aspects of mind, the particulars that depend upon the science of his day have become outmoded. A more recent approach to these limitations is proposed by Noam Chomsky and Steven Pinker. Like Kant, Noam Chomsky raised the issue of the mind's inherent programming. Chomsky selected as a particular example the acquiring of language by children. Of course, language is indispensable in the formulation and communication of our perceptions of the objective world:

"People do not think in English or Chinese or Apache; they think in a language of thought. This language of thought probably looks a bit like all these languages;...But compared with any given language, mentalese must be richer in some ways and simpler in others."

— Steven Pinker, The Language Instinct, p. 72

Chomsky marshaled evidence that a child's rapid mastery of the complexity of language indicated an innate ability programmed into the development of the human mind from birth that could not be explained by the "blank slate" view of the infant mind. Rather, the mind has a built-in propensity to process symbolic representations. The origins of this ability were sought by Steven Pinker in a Darwinian struggle that established the survival value of the ability to communicate. According to Pinker, Charles Darwin himself "concluded that language ability is 'an instinctive tendency to acquire an art', a design that is not peculiar to humans but seen in other species such as song-learning birds." This observation is strongly supported by research on crows.

This work can be taken to suggest that although a physical theory is an intermediary between our observations and our notions of connections between them, it is an elaborate mental construction that is a meld of the way the mind works and objective observations. Although a physical theory is used to determine connections about objective events, the specific form of the theoretical construct is a product of subjective activities, and this particular form may well involve the workings of the brain. Perhaps some aspects of the universe's operation can be expressed in terms of mental constructs, but this process is analogous with the expression of a computer algorithm in terms of assembly language instructions peculiar to a particular computer, a translation by a compiler of the general statement of an algorithm into specific tiny steps that particular computer can handle.

From this standpoint, as with the philosophy of Kant, the first-person active actions of mental causation may involve innate workings of the brain itself.

== See also ==
- Cognitive ethology
- Computational theory of mind
- Intelligent design
- Dualism
- Mind–body problem
- Model-dependent realism
- Neural correlates of consciousness
- Noumenon
- Philosophy of mind
- Physical determinism
- Simulated reality
- Vertiginous question

== In-line references ==
- Burge, Tyler (1979). "Individualism and the Mental". Midwest Studies in Philosophy. 4: 73–121. doi:10.1111/j.1475-4975.1979.tb00374.x.
- Davidson, Donald (1970). Mental Events. reprinted in Davidson (1980), pp. 207–227.
- Davidson, Donald (1980). Essays on Actions and Events. Oxford: Clarendon Press.
- Descartes, René (1986) [1642]. Meditations on First Philosophy (John Cottingham translated ed.). Cambridge: Cambridge University Press.
- Fodor, Jerry (1980). A theory of content and other essays. MIT Press. ISBN 0262061309.
- Putnam, Hilary (1975). "The Meaning of 'Meaning'". Putnam's Mind, Language and Reality: Philosophical Papers 2 (PDF). Cambridge University Press. pp. 215–71. Archived from the original (PDF) on 2013-06-18.
- Walter, Sven; Heckmann, Heinz-Dieter, eds. (2003). Physicalism and Mental Causation. Exeter, England: Imprint Academic. ISBN 0-907845-47-9.
- Yoo, Julie (2006). "Mental Causation". In James Fieser; Bradley Dowden (eds.). The Internet Encyclopedia of Philosophy.
- Kallestrup, J. Philos Stud (2006) 131: 459. https://doi.org/10.1007/s11098-005-1439-x
- Hoyt A. "How Crying Works" 2 July 2008. HowStuffWorks.com. <https://science.howstuffworks.com/life/inside-the-mind/emotions/crying.htm>
