= Conscious automatism =

Conscious automatism (C.A.) is a position on the philosophic question that asks whether determinism, as distinguished from “free will”, can be considered the sole operant principle in human decision making. The term “conscious automata” was introduced by Thomas H. Huxley in 1874 as part of a famous address he delivered in Belfast titled "On the Hypothesis that Animals are Automata, and Its History".

== Sources ==
- Hume, David; Treatise of Human Nature, 1739.
- Huxley, T.H.; Method and Results: Essays, 1893.
- Kane, Robert; The Oxford Handbook of Free Will. Oxford: Oxford University Press, 2002.
