= Ethical dualism =

View that good and evil are antagonistic forces

Ethical dualism, also called moral dualism, is the view that good and evil are antagonistic forces that govern the world and are locked in a perpetual conflict.

== Metaphysical dualism and ethical dualism ==
In relation to the theory of dualism in its broader philosophical and metaphysical sense, it is useful to point out how ethical dualism differs from it or what it adds to it.

Dualism is a theory which interprets any given situation in terms of two contrasting elements, which from a metaphysical point of view comes to imply that reality consists of two fundamental types of existence which cannot be reduced to each other. Examples of metaphysical dualisms are those between spirit and matter, God and the world, or, as theorized by Descartes, between thought and extension.

Ethical dualism, on the other hand, highlights the moral dimension instead or in addition to the metaphysical one, and envisions an inherent situation of conflict between two antagonistic forces, like light and darkness, Good and Evil.

== Religious interpretations ==
=== Zoroastrianism ===
One of the most known and clear-cut interpretations of ethical dualism is the one conceptualized by Zoroastrianism, the ancient Persian religion, which bases its thought on the figure of the prophet Zoroaster (or Zarathustra), who claimed the existence of two original and contrasting principles, Ahura Mazda and Ahriman, respectively representing the forces of Good and Evil. The world is therefore identified as the battleground between these two contrasting entities, also associated with light and darkness.

Each man and woman, for his or her self, select either of the two [...] The worst mind shall be for the wrongful, and the best mind shall be for the righteous.

— Yasna 30, 17 Gatha Hymns

Also, in Zoroastrianism, there is no room for reconcilement between the two opposing forces of good and evil:

Neither our thoughts, not teachings, nor intellects, nor choices, nor words, nor deeds, nor consciences, nor souls agree.

— Yasna 45, Ushtavaiti Gatha Song 10: Proclamation (The Two Spirits)

=== Judaism ===
Zoroastrianism and its doctrine of ethical dualism influenced the Jews and their thinking, as there is general agreement among scholars that the Jewish apocalypticism presents traits of dualism.

The Jews first came across Zoroastrian philosophy when the Persian King Cyrus freed them from their Babylonian captivity and allowed them to return to their homeland in the 6th century BCE. Therefore, it is possible that during this period the two peoples exchanged ideas about their view of the world, which would explain the clear reference to ethical dualism expressed and reformulated in Jewish terms in Chapter 31:15 of the Deuteronomy, the 5th book of the Torah:

See, today I set before you life and prosperity, death and disaster. If you obey the commandments of YHVH your God that I enjoin on you today, if you love YHVH your God and follow His ways, if you keep His commandments, His laws, His customs, you will live and increase, and YHVH your God will bless you in the land which you are entering to make your own. But if your heart strays, if you refuse to listen, if you let yourself be drawn into worshipping other gods and serving them, I tell you today, you will most certainly perish [...] I set before you life or death, blessing or curse. Choose life, then, so that you and your descendants may live

— Deut. 31:15-19, Jerusalem Bible translation.

=== Christianity ===
Christianity also presents some kind of relation to the concept of ethical dualism, as it built on some Zoroastrianized Jewish concepts. For example, the Prologue to the Gospel of John contains many elements of ethical dualism, such as the light/darkness metaphor:

In Him was life, and the life was the Light of men. The Light shines in the darkness, and the darkness did not comprehend it.

— John 1:4-5, Bible

This is the judgment, that the Light has come into the world, and men loved the darkness rather than the Light, for their deeds were evil. For everyone who does evil hates the Light, and does not come to the Light for fear that his deeds will be exposed. But he who practices the truth comes to the Light, so that his deeds may be manifested as having been wrought in God.

— John 3:19-21, Bible

Also, the figure of Satan is considered by some scholars to be quite similar to the Zoroastrian Ahriman, representing the "Adversary", the evil spirit who chose to do evil and who corrupts people and the physical world. However, unlike Zoroastrianism, Christian theology does not consider Satan, the Devil, to be original or ultimate like Ahriman, he is instead a deteriorated creature who corrupts people into committing evil, in line with the Christian rejection of any second eternal being coexistent with God.

== Practical actualizations in history ==
Throughout history, the interpretation of events from a perspective of ethical dualism has targeted different groups of people who are regarded as the perpetrators of evil in the world, such as the nobility, the bourgeoisie, the corporate elite, or Jewish people.

Usually these cases are associated with injustice, with people of a certain group blaming this injustice entirely on the group which is perceived to have caused it, leading to a situation of social polarization where dialogue between groups becomes stiff or impossible.

== Critiques and other interpretations ==
In Christian theology, ethical dualisms are avertible if one considers the Christian doctrine of Original Sin, which is said to affect all humans equally; therefore evil cannot be seen as the exclusive domain of a determined class or group of people. Hence the conflict between Good and Evil that characterizes the ethical view of dualism comes to exist only in the dimension of consciousness of every human being, so that Evil arises in the world through his/her wrong choices and actions.

In The Gulag Archipelago, Aleksandr Solzhenitsyn also expressed a similar view:

"If only it were all so simple! If only there were evil people somewhere insidiously committing evil deeds, and it were necessary only to separate them from the rest of us and destroy them. But the line dividing good and evil cuts through the heart of every human being. And who is willing to destroy a piece of his own heart?"

"Gradually it was disclosed to me that the line separating good and evil passes not through states, nor between classes, nor between political parties either -- but right through every human heart -- and through all human hearts."

Another interpretation of ethical dualism has been formulated by the theologian and realist Reinhold Niebuhr (1892 – 1971), who stressed the relativity of every moral and ethical choice. While trying to find the relation between individual and group ethics, he stressed the complexity of any social situation and resorted to a new formula of "dualistic ethics".

Niebuhr analyzed the injustice of modern industrial civilization and emphasized the contrast between "moral man and immoral society":

"Individual men may be moral in the sense that they are able to consider interests other than their own in determining problems of conduct, and are capable, on occasion, of preferring the advantages of others to their own [...] But all these achievements are more difficult, if not impossible, for human societies and social groups. In every human group there is less reason to guide and to check impulse, less capacity for self-transcendence, less ability to comprehend the need of others and therefore more unrestrained egoism than the individuals, who compose the groups, reveal in their personal relationships."

Therefore, according to Niebuhr, man as an individual is naturally provided with some unselfish impulses to which he is obliged by his conscience. However, when acting as a member of a group, man appears overwhelmed by moral inability, since the group lacks the organs of sensitivity of the individual. Hence, in Niebuhr's view, ethical dualism should be employed to point out the impossibility of reconciling such conflict between individual and societal ethics under one single ethical program.

== See also ==
- Dualism in cosmology
- Zoroastrianism
- Ethics
- Monism
- Philosophical pluralism
- Christian theology
