= Epiphenomenon =

Secondary phenomenon that occurs alongside or in parallel to a primary phenomenon

An epiphenomenon (pl. epiphenomena) is a secondary phenomenon that occurs alongside or in parallel to a primary phenomenon. The word has two senses: one that connotes known causation and one that connotes absence of causation or reservation of judgment about it.

== Examples ==
=== Metaphysics ===
In the philosophy of causality, an epiphenomenon is any effect of a cause apart from the effect under primary consideration. In situations in which an event of interest E is caused by (or, is said to be caused by) an event C, which also causes (or, is said to cause) an event F, then F is an epiphenomenon. The problem of epiphenomena is often a counterexample to theories of causation. For example, take a simplified Lewisian counterfactual analysis of causation that the meaning of propositions about causal relationships between two events A and B can be explained in terms of counterfactual conditionals of the form "if A had not occurred then B would not have occurred". Suppose that C causes E and that C has an epiphenomenon F. We then have that if E had not occurred, then F would not have occurred, either. But then according to the counterfactual analysis of causation, the proposition that there is a causal dependence of F on E is true; that is, on this view, E caused F. Since this is not in line with how we ordinarily speak about causation (we would not say that E caused F), a counterfactual analysis seems to be insufficient.

=== Philosophy of mind and psychology ===
An epiphenomenon can be an effect of primary phenomena, but cannot affect a primary phenomenon. In the philosophy of mind, epiphenomenalism is the view that mental phenomena are epiphenomena in that they can be caused by physical phenomena, but cannot cause physical phenomena. In strong epiphenomenalism, epiphenomena that are mental phenomena can only be caused by physical phenomena, not by other mental phenomena. In weak epiphenomenalism, epiphenomena that are mental phenomena can be caused by both physical phenomena and other mental phenomena, but mental phenomena cannot be the cause of any physical phenomenon.

The physical world operates independently of the mental world in epiphenomenalism; the mental world exists as a derivative parallel world to the physical world, affected by the physical world (and by other epiphenomena in weak epiphenomenalism), but not able to have an effect on the physical world. Instrumentalist versions of epiphenomenalism allow some mental phenomena to cause physical phenomena, when those mental phenomena can be strictly analyzable as summaries of physical phenomena, preserving causality of the physical world to be strictly analyzable by other physical phenomena.

=== Medicine ===
In the more general use of the word, a causal relationship between the phenomena is implied; the epiphenomenon is a consequence of the primary phenomenon. This is the sense that is related to the noun epiphenomenalism.

However, in medicine, this relationship is typically not implied, and the word is usually used in its second sense: an epiphenomenon may occur independently, and is called an epiphenomenon because it is not the primary phenomenon under study or because only correlation, not causation, is known or suspected. In this sense, saying that X is associated with Y as an epiphenomenon is preserving an acknowledgment that correlation does not imply causation. Signs, symptoms, syndromes (groups of symptoms), and risk factors can all be epiphenomena in this sense. For example, having an increased risk of breast cancer concurrent with taking an antibiotic is an epiphenomenon. It is not the antibiotic that is causing the increased risk, but the increased inflammation associated with the bacterial infection that prompted the taking of an antibiotic. The metaphor of a tree is one way of helping to explain the difference to someone struggling to understand. If the infection is the root of the tree, and the inflammation is the trunk, then the cancer and the antibiotic are two branches; the antibiotic is not the trunk.

=== Electromagnetism ===
Although electronics is said to be due to the influence of electrons, the standard approach to the study of electrical phenomena due to James Clerk Maxwell views these particles as secondary:

In Maxwell's theory, charge and current are 'epiphenomena' (secondary appearances) of underlying processes in what he termed, following Faraday, the electric and magnetic fields. Indeed, Maxwell's mature theory stays completely away from microstructure of matter and from any consideration of ‘electric substance’. Instead he proposed that certain quantities should be defined at every point in space, such that relations between them (the Maxwell equations) and functions of them (such as energy functions) determine phenomena. These quantities (the fields) may depend on microphysical events, and indeed Maxwell did expend some effort in his early papers on attempting to explain qualitatively how their relations could result in mechanical motions. However, the theory explains only large-scale phenomena, and it is not necessary to have the microscopic model in mind in order to work successfully with it.

=== Propositional theory ===
Zenon Pylyshyn suggested a propositional model of cognition where people do not conceptualize ideas in images but rather in meaningful relationships. In this theory, epiphenomena refer to images because they are merely products people conceptualize from their actual thought processes. Pylyshyn defends his claim by explaining that we only see images when we envision the form of an object. While visualizing objects or actions is a frequent process in our mind, it does not occur when we are considering the meaning behind an action or the non-visual properties of an object. There are many concepts we simply cannot envision. Additionally, when envisioning an image, it changes based on our preconceived notions, suggesting that semantic relations precede visual images. Unfortunately, the idea of epiphenomena in propositional theory is largely subjective and not falsifiable.
