= Property dualism =

Category of positions in the philosophy of mind

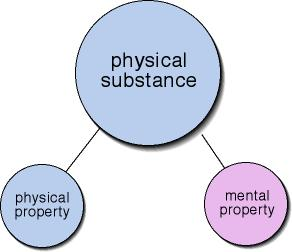
Property dualism: the exemplification of two kinds of property by one kind of substance.

Property dualism describes a category of positions in the philosophy of mind which hold that, although the world is composed of just one kind of substance—the physical kind—there exist two distinct kinds of properties: physical properties and mental properties. In other words, it is the view that at least some non-physical, mental properties (such as thoughts, imagination and memories) exist in, or naturally supervene upon, certain physical substances (namely brains).

Substance dualism, on the other hand, is the view that there exist in the universe two fundamentally different kinds of substance: physical (matter) and non-physical (mind or consciousness), and subsequently also two kinds of properties which inhere in those respective substances. Both substance and property dualism are opposed to reductive physicalism. Notable proponents of property dualism include David Chalmers, Christof Koch, and Richard Fumerton. It became prominent in the final decades of the twentieth century and is now the leading alternative to physicalism.

== Definition ==
Property dualism posits the existence of one material substance with essentially two different kinds of property: physical properties and mental properties. It argues that there are different kinds of properties that pertain to the only type of substance, the material substance: there are physical properties such as having colour or shape and there are mental properties like having certain beliefs or perceptions.

== Epiphenomenalism ==
Epiphenomenalism is a position in the philosophy of mind on the mind–body problem. It holds that one or more mental states and their properties are by-products (or epiphenomena) of the states of a closed physical system, and are not causally reducible to physical states (do not have any influence on physical states). According to this view, mental properties are as such real constituents of the world, but they are causally impotent; while physical causes give rise to mental properties like sensations, volition, ideas, etc., such mental phenomena themselves cause nothing further - they are causal dead ends. The opposing position is non-reductive physicalism, which hypothetically allows space for free will.

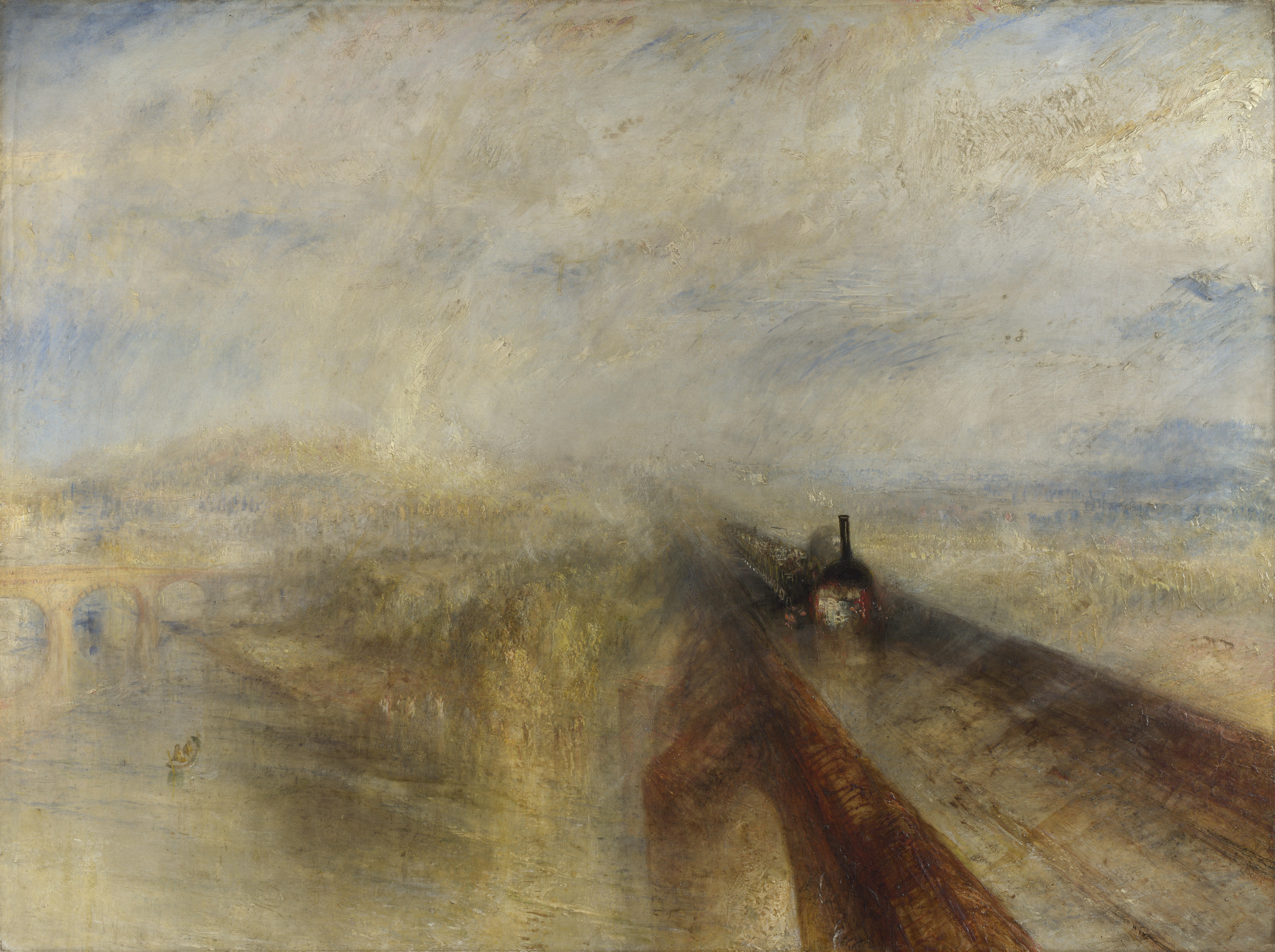
Huxley explained mental properties as like the steam on a locomotive

The position is credited to English biologist Thomas Huxley (Huxley 1874), who analogised mental properties to the whistle on a steam locomotive. The position found a level of favor amongst some scientific behaviorists over the next few decades, which then dove in response to the cognitive revolution in the 1960s.

=== Epiphenomenal qualia ===
In the papers "Epiphenomenal Qualia" and "What Mary Didn't Know", Frank Jackson made the so-called knowledge argument against physicalism. The thought experiment was originally proposed by Jackson as follows:

Mary is a brilliant scientist who is, for whatever reason, forced to investigate the world from a black and white room via a black and white television monitor. She specializes in the neurophysiology of vision and acquires, let us suppose, all the physical information there is to obtain about what goes on when we see ripe tomatoes, or the sky, and use terms like 'red', 'blue', and so on. She discovers, for example, just which wavelength combinations from the sky stimulate the retina, and exactly how this produces via the central nervous system the contraction of the vocal cords and expulsion of air from the lungs that results in the uttering of the sentence 'The sky is blue'. [...] What will happen when Mary is released from her black and white room or is given a color television monitor? Will she learn anything or not?

Jackson continued:

It seems just obvious that she will learn something about the world and our visual experience of it. But then it is inescapable that her previous knowledge was incomplete. But she had all the physical information. Ergo, there is more to have than that, and Physicalism is false.

== Other proponents ==
=== Saul Kripke ===
Saul Kripke has a well-known argument for some kind of property dualism. Using the concept of rigid designators, he states that if dualism is logically possible, then it is the case.

Let 'Descartes' be a name, or rigid designator, of a certain person, and let 'B' be a rigid designator of his body. Then if Descartes were indeed identical to B, the supposed identity, being an identity between two rigid designators, would be necessary.

== Criticism ==
In a short paper titled "Why I Am Not a Property Dualist", John Searle explains both why his own biological naturalism thesis is distinct from property dualism, as well as why he rejects the latter. He criticises property dualism for wanting to say that (1) the mental and physical are primary ontological categories, (2) the mental is irreducible to, or "over and above", the physical, and (3) the mental and physical are not two separate substances, but are rather two properties of the same physical substance; he sees all three statements taken together as contradictory, and also as forcing the property dualist to face a dilemma between epiphenomenalism and causal overdetermination. According to Searle, the first two statements necessarily commit one to a Cartesian substance ontology, and so the property dualist adds the third statement in order to avoid the problems inherent in substance dualism, but this ends up introducing the aforementioned dilemma between epiphenomenalism and causal overdetermination. Property dualism is thus essentially substance dualism dressed up in the language of properties.

Richard Rorty, in Chapter 1 of Philosophy and the Mirror of Nature, similarly criticises property dualism (what he calls "neo-dualism") for essentially being substance dualism under a different name. He claims that a dualism of properties (physical and phenomenal) can simply reflect two different ways of talking about the same thing, namely the states or properties of a person, and even though people are typically incorrigible when talking about themselves using the phenomenal vocabulary, he believes that this could simply reflect an epistemic distinction rather than an ontological one. According to Rorty, the only way that the property dualist can maintain an ontological gap between the two properties is by hypostatising phenomenal properties into non-physical particulars (qualia) which possess the property of being pure appearances. But then the property dualist starts to look like a substance dualist, since now there are two distinct property-bearing particulars (the person and their qualia) rather than one particular with two properties (the person).

== See also ==
- "What Is It Like to Be a Bat?"
- Chinese room
- Explanatory gap
- Functionalism (philosophy of mind)
- Physicalism
- Qualia
