= Epiphenomenalism =

Position on the mind–body problem

Epiphenomenalism is a philosophical theory on the mind–body problem in philosophy of mind. It holds that subjective mental events are completely dependent for their existence on corresponding physical and biochemical events within the human body, but do not themselves influence physical events. According to epiphenomenalism, the appearance that subjective mental states (such as thoughts and intentions) are causally effective themselves and directly influence physical events is an illusion generated by brain regions such as the prefrontal cortex, with consciousness itself being a by-product of physical states of the world. For instance, the emotion of fear seems to make the heart beat faster, but according to epiphenomenalism the biochemical secretions of the brain and nervous system (such as the stress hormone adrenaline)—not the subjective experience of fear itself—is what causes the rapid rise in heartbeat. Because mental events are a kind of overflow that cannot cause anything physical, yet have non-physical properties, epiphenomenalism has traditionally been viewed as a form of property dualism. In contemporary thought, there are a number of epiphenomenalistic questions that arise within a broadly materialist monism.

== Development ==
During the 17th century, René Descartes argued that animals are subject to mechanical laws of nature. He defended the idea of automatic behavior, or the performance of actions without conscious thought. Descartes questioned how the immaterial mind and the material body can interact causally. His interactionist model (1649) held that the body relates to the mind through the pineal gland. La Mettrie, Leibniz, and Spinoza all in their own way began this way of thinking. The idea that even if the animal were conscious nothing would be added to the production of behavior, even in animals of the human type, was first voiced by La Mettrie (1745), and then by Cabanis (1802), and was further explicated by Hodgson (1870) and Thomas Henry Huxley (1874).

Huxley agreed with Descartes that behavior is determined solely by physical mechanisms, but he also believed that humans enjoy an intelligent life. In 1874, Huxley argued, in the Presidential Address to the British Association for the Advancement of Science, that animals are conscious automata based on his experiments showing that movement was still possible without certain parts of the central nervous system being intact. Based on these results, Huxley proposed that consciousness itself was not in control of an animal's behavior, concluding that psychical changes are collateral products of physical changes. Like the bell of a clock that has no role in keeping time, consciousness has no role in determining behavior.

Huxley defended automatism by testing reflex actions, originally supported by Descartes. Huxley hypothesized that frogs that undergo lobotomy would swim when thrown into water, despite being unable to initiate actions. He argued that the ability to swim was solely dependent on the molecular change in the brain, concluding that consciousness is not necessary for reflex actions. According to epiphenomenalism, animals experience pain only as a result of neurophysiology.

In 1870, Huxley conducted a case study on a French soldier who had sustained a shot in the Franco-Prussian War that fractured his left parietal bone. Every few weeks the soldier would enter a trance-like state, smoking, dressing himself, and aiming his cane like a rifle all while being insensitive to pins, electric shocks, odorous substances, vinegar, noise, and certain light conditions. Huxley used this study to show that consciousness was not necessary to execute these purposeful actions, justifying the assumption that humans are insensate machines. Huxley's mechanistic attitude towards the body convinced him that the brain alone causes behavior.

In the early 1900s, scientific behaviorists such as Ivan Pavlov, John B. Watson, and B. F. Skinner began the attempt to uncover laws describing the relationship between stimuli and responses, without reference to inner mental phenomena. Instead of adopting a form of eliminative materialism or mental fictionalism, positions that deny that inner mental phenomena exist, a behaviorist was able to adopt epiphenomenalism in order to allow for the existence of mind. George Santayana (1905) believed that all motion has physical causes. Because consciousness is accessory to life and not essential to it, natural selection is responsible for ingraining tendencies to avoid certain contingencies without any conscious achievement involved. By the 1960s, scientific behaviorism met substantial difficulties and eventually gave way to the cognitive revolution. Participants in that revolution, such as Jerry Fodor, rejected epiphenomenalism and insist upon the efficacy of the mind. Fodor even speaks of "epiphobia"—fear that one is becoming an epiphenomenalist.

However, since the cognitive revolution, there have been several who have argued for a version of epiphenomenalism. In 1970, Keith Campbell proposed his "new epiphenomenalism", which states that the body produces a spiritual mind that does not act on the body. How the brain causes a spiritual mind, according to Campbell, is destined to remain beyond our understanding forever. In 2001, David Chalmers and Frank Cameron Jackson argued that claims about conscious states should be deduced a priori from claims about physical states alone. They offered that epiphenomenalism bridges, but does not close, the explanatory gap between the physical and the phenomenal realms. These more recent versions maintain that only the subjective, qualitative aspects of mental states are epiphenomenal. Imagine both Pierre and a robot eating a cupcake. Unlike the robot, Pierre is conscious of eating the cupcake while the behavior is under way. This subjective experience is often called a quale (plural qualia), and it describes the private "raw feel" or the subjective "what-it-is-like" that is the inner accompaniment of many mental states. Thus, while Pierre and the robot are both doing the same thing, only Pierre has the inner conscious experience.

Frank Cameron Jackson (1982), for example, once espoused the following view:

I am what is sometimes known as a "qualia freak". I think that there are certain features of bodily sensations especially, but also of certain perceptual experiences, which no amount of purely physical information includes. Tell me everything physical there is to tell about what is going on in a living brain... you won't have told me about the hurtfulness of pains, the itchiness of itches, pangs of jealousy....

Some thinkers draw distinctions between different varieties of epiphenomenalism. In Consciousness Explained, Daniel Dennett distinguishes between a purely metaphysical sense of epiphenomenalism, in which the epiphenomenon has no causal impact at all, and Huxley's "steam whistle" epiphenomenalism, in which effects exist but are not functionally relevant.

== Arguments for ==
Some neurophysiological data have been proffered in support of epiphenomenalism, suggesting that at least some choices and actions appear to be actually controlled by subconscious brain processes for which the conscious mind later takes credit. Some of the oldest such data is the Bereitschaftspotential or "readiness potential" in which electrical activity related to voluntary actions can be recorded up to two seconds before the subject is aware of making a decision to perform the action. More recently Benjamin Libet, et al. (1979) have shown that it can take 0.5 seconds before a stimulus becomes part of conscious experience even though subjects can respond to the stimulus in reaction time tests within 200 milliseconds. The methods and conclusions of this experiment have received much criticism (e.g., see the many critical commentaries in Libet's (1985) target article), including fairly recently by neuroscientists such as Peter Ulric Tse, who claims to show that the readiness potential has nothing to do with consciousness at all.

== Arguments against ==
One argument against epiphenomenalism is that it is self-contradictory: if we have knowledge of epiphenomenalism, then our brains know the mind exists, but if epiphenomenalism were true, our brains should not have any knowledge of the mind, because the mind does not affect anything physical.

However, some philosophers do not accept this as a rigorous refutation. For example, philosopher Victor Argonov states that epiphenomenalism is a questionable, but experimentally falsifiable theory. He argues that the personal mind is not the only source of knowledge about the mind's existence in the world. A creature (such as a philosophical zombie) could have knowledge about the mind and the mind-body problem by virtue of some innate knowledge. The information about the mind (and its problematic properties such as qualia and the hard problem of consciousness) could have been, in principle, implicitly "written" in the material world since its creation. Epiphenomenalists can say that God created an immaterial mind and a detailed "program" of material human behavior that makes it possible to speak about the mind–body problem. That version of epiphenomenalism seems highly exotic, but it cannot be ruled out by pure theory. However, Argonov suggests that experiments could refute epiphenomenalism. In particular, epiphenomenalism could be refuted if neural correlates of consciousness are found in the human brain and it is proven that human speech about consciousness is caused by them.

Some philosophers, such as Daniel Dennett, reject both epiphenomenalism and the traditional conception of qualia, arguing that they involve a category mistake analogous to the one Gilbert Ryle identified in the Cartesian conception of the mind as a "ghost in the machine". On this view, qualia are not intrinsic, private objects of experience that exist independently of the cognitive and behavioral processes in which experience consists; rather, conscious experiences are to be understood in terms of the ways organisms perceive, discriminate, respond to, and otherwise engage with the world.

Functionalists assert that mental states are well described by their overall role, their activity in relation to the organism as a whole. "This doctrine is rooted in Aristotle's conception of the soul, and has antecedents in Hobbes's conception of the mind as a 'calculating machine', but it has become fully articulated (and popularly endorsed) only in the last third of the 20th century." In so far as it mediates stimulus and response, a mental function is analogous to a program that processes input/output in automata theory. In principle, multiple realisability would guarantee platform dependencies can be avoided, whether in terms of hardware and operating system or, ex hypothesi, biology and philosophy. Because a high-level language is a practical requirement for developing the most complex programs, functionalism implies that a non-reductive physicalism would offer a similar advantage over a strictly eliminative materialism.

Eliminative materialists often state that folk psychology is so unscientific that, ultimately, it will be better to eliminate primitive concepts such as mind, desire and belief, in favor of a future neuroscientific account. A more moderate position such as J. L. Mackie's error theory suggests that false beliefs should be stripped away from a mental concept without eliminating the concept itself, the legitimate core meaning being left intact.

Benjamin Libet’s results are quoted in favor of epiphenomenalism, but he believes subjects still have a "conscious veto", since the readiness potential does not invariably lead to an action. In Freedom Evolves, Daniel Dennett argues that a no-free-will conclusion is based on dubious assumptions about the location of consciousness, as well as questioning the accuracy and interpretation of Libet's results. Similar criticism of Libet-style research has been made by neuroscientist Adina Roskies and cognitive theorists Tim Bayne and Alfred Mele.

Others have argued that data such as the Bereitschaftspotential undermine epiphenomenalism for the same reason: such experiments rely on a subject reporting the point in time at which a conscious experience and a conscious decision occur, thus requiring the subject to be able to perform an action consciously. That ability would seem to be at odds with early epiphenomenalism, which according to Huxley is the broad claim that consciousness is "completely without any power… as the steam-whistle which accompanies the work of a locomotive engine is without influence upon its machinery". Many mind–body dualists reject epiphenomenalism on the same grounds. Some philosophers have also pointed out how strange it is that the brain expends copious amounts of energy and glucose maintaining the state of consciousness, yet the conscious mind may play no role in making the final decision. It remains difficult to provide a coherent mechanistic explanation of how a non-physical mind could actually influence any part of the physical body or the physical world at large.

Adrian G. Guggisberg and Annaïs Mottaz have also challenged those findings.

A study by Aaron Schurger and colleagues published in Proceedings of the National Academy of Sciences of the United States of America (PNAS) challenged assumptions about the causal nature of the readiness potential itself (and the "pre-movement buildup" of neural activity in general), thus denying the conclusions drawn from studies such as Libet's and Fried's.

In favor of interactionism, Celia Green (2003) argues that epiphenomenalism does not even provide a satisfactory solution to the problem of interaction posed by substance dualism. Although it does not entail substance dualism, according to Green, epiphenomenalism implies a one-way form of interactionism that is just as hard to conceive of as the two-way form embodied in substance dualism. Green suggests that the assumption that it is less of a problem may arise from the unexamined belief that physical events have some primacy over mental ones.

A number of scientists and philosophers, including William James, Karl Popper, John Eccles, and Donald Symons, dismiss epiphenomenalism from an evolutionary perspective. They point out that the view that the mind is an epiphenomenon of brain activity is not consistent with evolutionary theory, because if the mind were functionless, it would have disappeared long ago, as it would not have been favoured by evolution.

== See also ==
- Anomalous monism
- Emergentism
- Frank Cameron Jackson
- George Santayana
- Mind–body dualism
- Non-reductive physicalism
- Philosophy of mind
- Problem of mental causation
- Property dualism
- Specious present
- Supervenience
- Qualia
