= Supervenience =

Relation between sets of properties or facts

The upper levels on this chart can be considered to supervene on the lower levels.

In philosophy, supervenience refers to a relation between sets of properties or sets of facts. X is said to supervene on Y if and only if some difference in Y is necessary for any difference in X to be possible.

Examples of supervenience, in which case the truth values of some propositions cannot vary unless the truth values of some other propositions vary, include:

- Whether there is a table in the living room supervenes on the positions of molecules in the living room.
- The truth value of (A) supervenes on the truth value of its negation, (¬A), and vice versa.

Supervenience is of interest to philosophers because it differs from other nearby relations, for example entailment. Some philosophers believe it possible for some A to supervene on some B without being entailed by B. In such cases it may seem puzzling why A should supervene on B and equivalently why changes in A should require changes in B. Two important applications of supervenience involve cases like this. One of these is the supervenience of mental properties (like the sensation of pain) on physical properties (like the firing of 'pain neurons'). A second is the supervenience of normative facts (facts about how things ought to be) on natural facts (facts about how things are).

The possibility of "supervenience without entailment" or "supervenience without reduction" is contested territory among philosophers.

== History ==
Supervenience, which means literally "coming or occurring as something novel, additional, or unexpected", from "super," meaning on, above, or additional, and "venire," meaning to come in Latin, shows occurrences in the Oxford English Dictionary dating back to 1844.

Its systematic use in philosophy is considered to have begun in early 20th-century meta-ethics and emergentism. As G.E. Moore wrote in 1922, "if a given thing possesses any kind of intrinsic value in a certain degree, then... anything exactly like it, must, under all circumstances, possess it in exactly the same degree." This usage also carried over into the work of R. M. Hare.

In the 1970s, Donald Davidson was the first to use the term to describe a broadly physicalist (and non-reductive) approach to the philosophy of mind, called anomalous monism. As he said in 1970, "supervenience might be taken to mean that there cannot be two events alike in all physical respects but differing in some mental respects, or that an object cannot alter in some mental respects without altering in some physical respects."

In subsequent years Terence ("Terry") Horgan, David Lewis, and especially Jaegwon Kim formalized the concept and began applying it to many issues in the philosophy of mind. This raised numerous questions about how various formulations relate to one another, how adequate the formulation is to various philosophical tasks (in particular, the task of formulating physicalism), and whether it avoids or entails reductionism.

== Definitions ==
In the contemporary literature, there are two primary (and non-equivalent) formulations of supervenience (for both definitions let A and B be sets of properties).

(1) A-properties supervene on B-properties if and only if all things that are B-indiscernible are A-indiscernible. Formally:

- $\forall x \forall y (\forall X_{\in B} (Xx \leftrightarrow Xy) \rightarrow \forall Y_{\in A} (Yx \leftrightarrow Yy))$

(2) A-properties supervene on B-properties if and only if anything that has an A-property has some B-property such that anything that has that B-property also has that A-property. Formally:

- $\forall x \forall X_{\in A} (Xx \rightarrow \exists Y_{\in B} (Yx \land \forall y (Yy \rightarrow Xy)))$

For example, if one lets A be a set of mental properties, lets B be a set of physical properties, and chooses a domain of discourse consisting of persons, then (1) says that any two persons who are physically indiscernible are mentally indiscernible, and (2) says that any person who has a mental property has some physical property such that any person with that physical property has that mental property.

Some points of clarification: first, the definitions above involve quantification over properties and hence higher-order logic. Second, in (1), expressions of the form $(\forall X (Xx \leftrightarrow Xy))$ capture the concept of sharing all properties, or being indiscernible with respect to a set of properties. Thus, (1) can be understood more intuitively as the claim that all objects that are indiscernible with respect to a base set of properties are indiscernible with respect to a supervenient set of properties, or, as it is also sometimes said, that B-twins are A-twins. Finally, supervenience claims typically involve some modal force, however, the way that modal force is specified depends on which more specific variety of supervenience one decides upon (see below).

(1) and (2) are sometimes called "schemata" because they do not correspond to actual supervenience relations until the sets of properties A and B, the domain of entities to which those properties apply, and a modal force have been specified. For modal forms of supervenience, the modal strength of the relation is usually taken to be a parameter (that is, the possible worlds appealed to may be physically possible, logically possible, etc.). Also, note that in the early literature properties were not always central, and there remain some who prefer to frame the relation in terms of predicates, facts, or entities instead, for example.

== Varieties of supervenience ==
Beginning in the 1980s, inspired largely by Jaegwon Kim's work, philosophers proposed many varieties of supervenience, which David Lewis called the "unlovely proliferation". These varieties are based both on (1) and (2) above, but because (1) is more common we shall focus on varieties of supervenience based on it.

We can begin by distinguishing between local and global supervenience:

- Local: For any two objects x and y, if x and y are base-indiscernible, they are supervenient-indiscernible.

For example, if mental states locally supervene on brain states, then being in the same brain state entails being in the same mental state.

- Global: For any two worlds w1 and w2, if w1 and w2 are base-indiscernible, they are supervenient-indiscernible.

For example, if psychological properties globally supervene on physical properties, then any two worlds physically the same will be psychologically the same. The value of global supervenience is that it allows for supervenient properties to be determined not by local properties of an individual thing alone, but by some wider spatiotemporal distribution of things and properties. For example, something's being a dollar bill depends not only on the paper and the inks it is made out of, but also on a widely dispersed variety of features of the world it occupies.

Both local and global supervenience come in many forms. Local supervenience comes in strong and weak varieties:

- Weak: For any world w, and for any two objects x in w and y in w, if x and y are base-indiscernible, they are supervenient-indiscernible.
- Strong: For any worlds w1 and w2, and for any two objects x in w1 and y in w2, if x and y are base-indiscernible, they are supervenient-indiscernible.

The difference is essentially whether correlations between base and supervenient properties hold within actual worlds only, or across possible worlds. For example, if psychological properties strongly locally supervene on physical properties, then any two people physically the same, in any two worlds, will also be psychologically the same. On the other hand, if psychological properties only weakly locally supervene on physical properties, then those correlations between base and supervenient properties that hold in virtue of the supervenience relation are maintained within each world, but can be different in different worlds. For example, my physical duplicates in the actual world will have the same thoughts as I have; but my physical duplicates in other possible worlds may have different thoughts than I have in the actual world.

There are also several kinds of global supervenience relations, which were introduced to handle cases in which worlds are the same at the base level and also at the supervenient level, but where the ways the properties are connected and distributed in the worlds differ. For example, it is consistent with global mental–physical supervenience on the simple formulation described above for two worlds to have the same number of people in the same physical states, but for the mental states to be distributed over those people in different ways (e.g. I have my father's thoughts in the other world, and he has my thoughts). To handle this, property-preserving isomorphisms (1-1 and onto functions between the objects of two worlds, whereby an object in one world has a property if and only if the object which that function takes you to in the other world does) are used, and once this is done, several varieties of global supervenience can be defined.

Other varieties of supervenience include multiple-domains supervenience and similarity-based supervenience.

== Examples of supervenient properties ==
=== Value properties ===
The value of a physical object to an agent is sometimes held to be supervenient upon the physical properties of the object. In aesthetics, the beauty of La Grande Jatte might supervene on the physical composition of the painting (the specific molecules that make up the painting), the artistic composition of the painting (in this case, dots), the figures and forms of the painted image, or the painted canvas as a whole. In ethics, the goodness of an act of charity might supervene on the physical properties of the agent, the mental state of the agent (his or her intention), or the external state of affairs itself. Similarly, the overall suffering caused by an earthquake might supervene on the spatiotemporal entities that constituted it, the deaths it caused, or the natural disaster itself. The claim that moral properties are supervenient upon non-moral properties is called moral supervenience.

=== Mental properties ===
In philosophy of mind, many philosophers make the general claim that the mental supervenes on the physical. In its most recent form this position derives from the work of Donald Davidson, although in more rudimentary forms it had been advanced earlier by others. The claim can be taken in several senses, perhaps most simply in the sense that the mental properties of a person are supervenient on their physical properties. Then:

- If two persons are indistinguishable in all of their physical properties, they must also be indistinguishable in all of their mental properties.

An alternative claim, advanced especially by John Haugeland, is a kind of weak local supervenience claim; or, weaker still, mere global supervenience. The claim that mental properties supervene globally on physical properties requires only a quite modest commitment: any difference between two possible worlds with respect to their instantiated mental properties entails at least some difference in the physical properties instantiated in those two worlds. Importantly, it does not require that the mental properties of an individual person supervene only on that person's physical state.

This weak global thesis is particularly important in the light of direct reference theories, and semantic externalism with regard to the content both of words and (more relevant to our concerns here) of thoughts. Imagine two persons who are indistinguishable in their local physical properties. One has a dog in front of his eyes and the other has a dog-image artificially projected onto his retinae. It might be reasonable to say that the former is in the mental state of seeing a dog (and of knowing that he does so), whereas the latter is not in such a state of seeing a dog (but falsely believes that he sees one).

There is also discussion among philosophers about mental supervenience and our experience of duration. If all mental properties supervene only upon some physical properties at durationless moments, then it may be difficult to explain our experience of duration. The philosophical belief that mental and physical events exist as a series of durationless moments that lie between the physical past and the physical future is known as presentism.

=== Computational properties ===
There are several examples of supervenience to be found in computer networking. For example, in a dial-up internet connection, the audio signal on a phone line transports IP packets between the user's computer and the Internet service provider's computer. In this case, the arrangement of bytes in that packet supervenes on the physical properties of the phone signal. More generally, each layer of the OSI Model of computer networking supervenes on the layers below it.

We can find supervenience wherever a message is conveyed by a representational medium. When we see a letter "a" in a page of print, for example, the meaning Latin lowercase "a" supervenes on the geometry of the boundary of the printed glyph, which in turn supervenes on the ink deposition on the paper.

=== Biological properties ===
In biological systems phenotype can be said to supervene on genotype. This is because any genotype encodes a finite set of unique phenotypes, but any given phenotype is not produced by a finite set of genotypes. Innumerable examples of convergent evolution can be used to support this claim. Throughout nature, convergent evolution produces incredibly similar phenotypes from a diverse set of taxa with fundamentally different genotypes underpinning the phenotypes. One example is evolution on islands which is a remarkably predictable example of convergent evolution where the same phenotypes consistently evolve for the same reasons. Organisms released from predation tend to become larger, while organisms limited by food tend to become smaller. Yet there are almost infinite numbers of genetic changes that might lead to changes in body size. Another example of convergent evolution is the loss of sight that almost universally occurs in cave fish living in lightless pools. Eyes are expensive, and in lightless cave pools there is little reason for fish to have eyes. Yet, despite the remarkably consistent convergent evolution producing sightless cave fish, the genetics that produce the loss of sight phenotype is different nearly every time. This is because phenotype supervenes on genotype.

== Arguments against supervenience-based formulations of physicalism ==
Although supervenience seems to be perfectly suited to explain the predictions of physicalism (i.e. the mental is dependent on the physical), there are four main problems with it. They are Epiphenomenal ectoplasm, the lone ammonium molecule problem, modal status problem and the problem of necessary beings.

=== Epiphenomenal ectoplasm ===
Epiphenomenal ectoplasm was proposed by Horgan and Lewis in 1983; they envisioned a possible world (a world that could possibly exist) W which is identical to our world in the distribution of all mental and physical characteristics (i.e. they are identical), except world W contains an experience called epiphenomenal ectoplasm that does not causally interact with that world. The possibility of such a world should be compatible with physicalism as this is a property of the actual world; but a supervenience-based definition of physicalism would imply that such a world could not exist, because it differs from the actual world with respect to a mental property, but is physically identical. A typical response to this objection is Frank Jackson's; he adjusted the supervenience-based definition of physicalism to state "Physicalism is true at a possible world W if and only if any world which is a minimal physical duplicate (i.e. is physically identical) of W is a duplicate of W simpliciter." This avoids the problem because the "ectoplasm" world is not a minimal physical duplicate, so its identity with the actual world need not follow.

=== The lone ammonium molecule problem ===
The lone ammonium molecule problem provides a problem for Jackson's solution to epiphenomenal ectoplasm. It was proposed by Jaegwon Kim in 1993 when he stated that according to Jackson's idea of supervenience, a possible world W was identical to the actual world, except it possessed an extra ammonium molecule on one of Saturn's rings. This may not seem to provide much of a problem, but because Jackson's solution refers only to minimal physical duplicates, this allows for the mental properties of W to be vastly different from those in the actual world. If such a difference would cause mental differences on Earth, it would not be consistent with our understanding of physicalism.

=== Modal status ===
Suppose that the supervenience thesis for physicalism is stated as a nomological constraint, rather than a metaphysical one; this avoids any objection based on the thesis ruling out metaphysical possibilities which a physicalist would leave open. But the thesis would not rule out the metaphysical possibility of philosophical zombies, although their impossibility is a clear consequence of physicalism.

=== Problem of necessary beings ===
The problem of necessary beings was proposed by Jackson in 1998, in which he stated that the existence of a non-physical necessary being (in all possible worlds) would prove physicalism false. However, physicalism allows for the existence of necessary beings, because any minimal physical duplicate would have the same necessary being as the actual world. This however is paradoxical, based on the fact that physicalism both permits and prevents the existence of such beings.

== See also ==
- Functionalism (philosophy of mind)
- Emergentism
- Downward causation
- Nominalism
- Multiple realizability
