= Aboutness =

Aspect of terminology

Aboutness is a term used in library and information science (LIS), linguistics, philosophy of language, and philosophy of mind. In general, the term refers to the concept that a text, utterance, image, or action is on or of something. In LIS, it is often considered synonymous with a document's subject. In the philosophy of mind, it has been often considered synonymous with intentionality, perhaps since John Searle (1983). In the philosophy of logic and language, it is understood as the way a piece of text relates to a subject matter or topic.

R. A. Fairthorne (1969) is credited with coining the exact term "aboutness", which became popular in LIS since the late 1970s, perhaps due to arguments put forward by William John Hutchins (1975, 1977, 1978). Hutchins argued that "aboutness" was to be preferred to "subject" because it removed some epistemological problems. Birger Hjørland (1992, 1997) argued, however, that the same epistemological problems also were present in Hutchins' proposal, why "aboutness" and "subject" should be considered synonymous.

While information scientists may well be concerned with the literary aboutness (John Hutchins, 1975, 1977, 1978), philosophers of mind and psychologists with the psychological or intentional aboutness (John Searle, 1983) and language of thought (Jerry Fodor, 1975), and semantic externalists with the external state of affairs (Hilary Putnam, 1975). These seminal perspectives are respectively analogous to Ogden and Richards' Literary, psychological, and external contexts (1923), as well as Karl Popper's World 1, 2, and 3 (1977).

== See also ==
- Content analysis
- Intentional stance
- Theme and rheme

== Literature ==
- Furner, J. (November 5, 2006). "The ontology of subjects of works". ASIS&T conference.
- Hjørland, B. (2001). "Towards a theory of aboutness, subject, topicality, theme, domain, field, content... and relevance". Journal of the American Society for Information Science and Technology, 52(9), 774–778.
- Bruza, P. D., Song, D. W., & Wong, K. F. (2000). "Aboutness from a commonsense perspective". Journal of the American Society for Information Science, 51(12), 1090–1105. Available at: http://people.kmi.open.ac.uk/dawei/papers/aboutness-aista00.pdf
- Campbell, G. (2000a). "Aboutness and meaning: How a paradigm of subject analysis can illuminate queer theory in literary studies". IN: CAIS 2000. Canadian Association for Information Science: Proceedings of the 28th Annual Conference.
- Campbell, G. (2000b). "Queer theory and the creation of contextual subject access tools for gay and lesbian communities". Knowledge Organization, 27(3), 122–131.
- Hjørland, B. (1997): Information seeking and subject representation: An activity-theoretical approach to information science. Westport & London: Greenwood Press.
- Holley, R., and Joudrey, D.N. (2021). "Aboutness and Conceptual Analysis: A Review", Cataloging & Classification Quarterly 59:2-3, 159–185.
- Joudrey, D. N. (2005). Building Puzzles And Growing Pearls: A Qualitative Exploration Of Determining Aboutness (PhD diss.: University of Pittsburgh).
- Heidegger, M. (1996). Being and Time, trans. by Joan Stambaugh. Albany: State University of New York Press.
- Hjørland, B. (1992). "The concept of "subject" in information science". Journal of Documentation, 48(2), 172–200.
- Frohmann, B. (1990). "Rules of indexing: A critique of mentalism in information retrieval theory". Journal of Documentation, 81–101.
- Beghtol, C. (1986). "Bibliographic classification theory and text linguistics: aboutness analysis, intertextuality and the cognitive act of classifying documents". Journal of Documentation, 42, 84–113.
- Searle, John (1983). Intentionality: An Essay in the Philosophy of Mind, Cambridge University Press.
- Salem, Shawky (1982). "Towards "coring" and "aboutness": An approach to some aspects of in-depth indexing". Journal of Information Science Principles & Practice, 1982, 4, 167–170.
- Mark Petersen, A. (1979). "The meaning of "about" in fiction indexing and retrieval". ASLIB Proceedings, 31, 251- 257.
- Swift, D. F., Winn, V. & Bramer, D. (1978). ""Aboutness" as a strategy for retrieval in the social sciences". ASLIB Proceedings, 30, 182–187.
- Hutchings, W. J. (1978). "The concept of "aboutness" in subject indexing". ASLIB Proceedings, 30, 172–181.
- Hutchins, W. J. (1977). "On the problem of "aboutness" in document analysis". Journal of Informatics, 1, 17–35.
- Maron, M. E. (1977). "On indexing, retrieval and the meaning of about". Journal of the American Society for Information Science, 28, 38–43.
- Heidegger, M. (1977). "Sein und Zeit", in Heidegger's Gesamtausgabe, volume 2, ed. F.-W. von Herrmann, 1977, XIV, 586p.
- Hutchins, W. J. (1975). Languages of indexing and classification. A linguistic study of structures and functions. London: Peter Peregrinus.
- Fairthorne, R. A. (1969). "Content analysis, specification and control". Annual Review of Information Science and Technology, 4, 73–109.
- Heidegger, M. (1962). Being and Time, trans. by John Macquarrie & Edward Robinson. London: SCM Press.
- Goodman, N. (1961). "About". Mind, 70(277), 1-24.
- Putnam, H. (1958). "Formalization of the concept "about"". Philosophy of Science, 25(2), 125-130.
- Thalheimer, R. (1936). "More about "about"". Analysis, 3(3): 46-48.
- Ryle, G. (1933). "About". Analysis, 1(1): 10–11.
- Yablo, S. (2014) Aboutness, Princeton University Press
