= Phenomenal concept strategy =

Approach within philosophy of mind

The phenomenal concept strategy (PCS) is an approach within philosophy of mind to provide a physicalist response to anti-physicalist arguments like the explanatory gap and philosophical zombies. The name was coined by Daniel Stoljar. As David Chalmers put it, PCS "locates the gap in the relationship between our concepts of physical processes and our concepts of consciousness, rather than in the relationship between physical processes and consciousness themselves." The idea is that if we can explain why we think there is an explanatory gap, this will defuse the motivation to question physicalism.

== Overview ==
PCS advocates typically subscribe to what Chalmers has called "type-B materialism", which holds that there is an epistemic but not ontological gap between physics and subjective experience. PCS maintains that our concepts are dualistic, but reality is monistic, in a similar way as "heat" and "molecular motion" are two different concepts that refer to the same property. However, phenomenal concepts are different from other concepts in that they incline us to see an epistemic gap. PCS suggests that physicalist explanations "cannot feel satisfactory [...] since the concepts used in the physical explanation don't entail any applications of the phenomenal concepts in terms of which the explanandum is characterized."

PCS would help physicalists answer the knowledge argument because upon seeing red, Mary would have new thoughts about phenomenal concepts, even though those thoughts would only re-express physical facts she already knew. Likewise, we can conceive of zombies even if they are not possible because when we think about their functional/physical characteristics, we do not also conjure thoughts about phenomenal concepts.

David Papineau coined the term antipathetic fallacy to refer to the way in which we fail to see phenomenal experience in brain processing. It is the opposite of the pathetic fallacy of seeing consciousness in non-minds.

== Types of concepts ==
Chalmers outlines several ways in which phenomenal concepts might be distinctive:

=== Recognitional concepts ===
These are so-called "type-demonstratives" in which we point to "one of those". For instance:

Suppose you go into the California desert and spot a succulent never seen before. You become adept at recognizing instances, and gain a recognitional command of their kind, without a name for it; you are disposed to identify positive and negative instances and thereby pick out a kind. These dispositions are typically linked with capacities to form images, whose conceptual role seems to be to focus thoughts about an identifiable kind in the absence of currently perceived instances.

Peter Carruthers suggests that phenomenal concepts are purely recognitional, which means

1. they apply directly to instances
2. they are conceptually isolated, i.e., do not have a priori connections with other concepts (including physical or functional concepts).

=== Distinct conceptual roles ===
We think about physical and phenomenal concepts in different ways.

=== Indexical concepts ===
Several philosophers have suggested that phenomenal concepts denote brain states indexically, in a similar way as saying "now" picks out a particular time. Even given full knowledge of physics, additional indexical information is required to say where and when one is.

=== Quotational/constitutional concepts ===
Some contend that phenomenal states are part of the concepts that refer to them. For instance, Papineau suggests that phenomenal concepts are quotational, like saying "That state: ___."

Katalin Balog defends a constitutional account of phenomenal concepts, in which "token experiences serve as modes of presentation of the phenomenal properties they instantiate." For instance, the concept of pain is partly constituted by a token experience of pain. She claims this position helps resolve the explanatory gap because an a priori description alone does not suffice to express the concept; in addition, a direct experiential constitution is required. While it seems like physical/functional information about H_{2}O tells us all there is about it, we feel something more for phenomenality because we "have a 'substantive' grasp of its nature."

Papineau takes a similar position. He claims that normal physical identity statements (such as that heat is molecular kinetic energy) involve two descriptions, which we can associate in our minds. In contrast, we think about a phenomenal concept by either "actually undergoing the experience" or at least by imagining it, and this creates a "what-it's-likeness" sensation. Then:

This subjective commonality can easily confuse us when we contemplate identities like pains = nociceptive-specific neuronal activity. We focus on the left-hand side, deploy our phenomenal concept of pain (that feeling), and therewith feel something akin to pain. Then we focus on the right-hand side, deploy our concept of nociceptive-specific neurons, and feel nothing (or at least nothing in the pain dimension—we may visually imagine axons and dendrites and so on). And so we conclude that the right hand side leaves out the feeling of pain itself, the unpleasant what-it's-likeness, and refers only to the distinct physical correlates of pain.

Papineau compares the situation to the use–mention distinction: Phenomenal concepts directly use the experiences to which they refer, while physical descriptions merely mention them.

== Chalmers' counter-argument ==
David Chalmers presents what he terms "A Master Argument" against PCS. He argues that phenomenal concepts are ultimately characterized either in a manner too weak to bridge the explanatory gap or too strong to themselves yield to physical explanation. He contends that in either case, PCS fails to refute arguments against physicalism.

At a more technical level, Chalmers defines C as the PCS thesis that

1. humans have psychological features
2. that explain why we have the apparent epistemic gaps with consciousness,
3. and this explanation is purely physical.

All three of these must hold for PCS to succeed. He then defines P as all physical facts. Then he poses a dilemma:

- "If P&~C is conceivable, then C is not physically explicable." This is because P&~C logically means physics alone does not explain C. If true, this horn would invalidate #3 of C.
- "If P&~C is not conceivable, then C cannot explain our epistemic situation." This is because if P&~C is not conceivable, C must follow straightforwardly from P. Hence, even zombies would satisfy C (since nothing more than P is required). But zombies would not completely share our epistemic situation—for instance, because their statements that "I'm phenomenally conscious" would be false while ours would be true. Since zombies might also share C, C does not explain why our epistemic situation is different from theirs. If true, this horn would invalidate #2 of C.

Regardless of which horn is true, C is invalidated.

=== Reply ===
Carruthers and Veillet argue that Chalmers's argument commits a fallacy of equivocation between first-person and third-person phenomenal concepts, but the authors reformulate it to avoid that problem. They proceed to attack the revised argument by denying the premise that if zombies must have third-person phenomenal concepts, then phenomenal concepts cannot account for the explanatory gap. In particular, they suggest that, pace Chalmers, people and zombies would have the same epistemic situation even though the contents of their situations would be different. For instance, a person's phenomenal concept would have content of a phenomenal state, while the "schmenomenal" concept of a zombie would have content about a "schmenomenal" state. A zombie "is correct when he says that he is conscious, because he isn't saying that he has phenomenal states as we understand them. He is correct because he means that he has schmenomenal states, and he has them." So people and zombies can both have true beliefs justified in similar ways (same epistemic situation), even if those beliefs are about different things.

Chalmers's "Master Argument" relies on the assumption that his Zombie argument (also known as the conceivability argument) is true. Critics of the argument have variously disputed either the first or second premise. Many philosophers have offered objections to the conceivability argument.

== See also ==
- Phenomenal stance
