= Antonio Millán-Puelles =

Spanish philosopher (1921–2005)

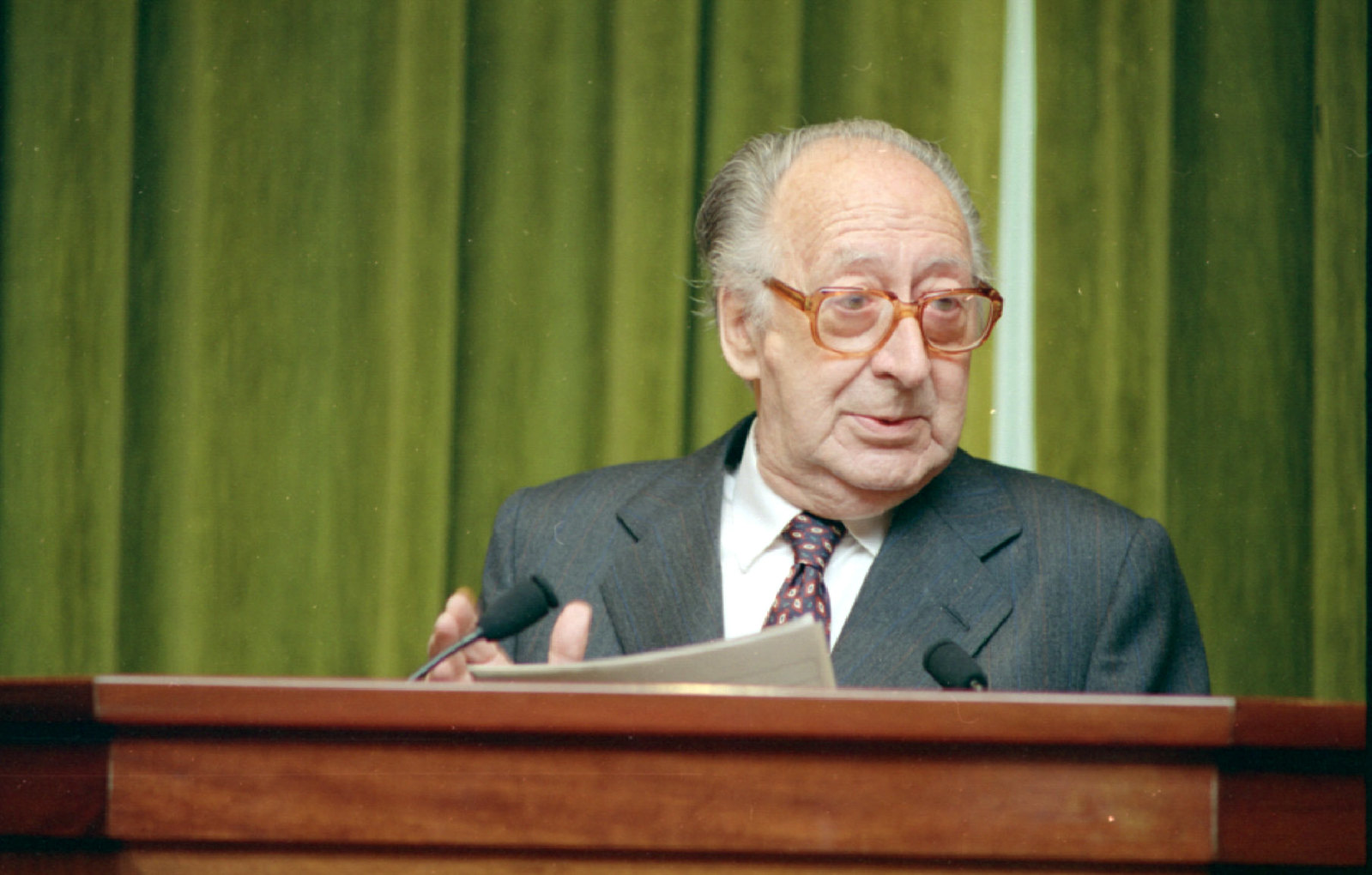
- Millán-Puelles in 1994
- Born: 11 February 1921; Alcalá de los Gazules, Cádiz, Spain
- Died: 22 March 2005 (aged 84); Madrid, Spain

Philosophical work
- Era: 20th-century philosophy
- Region: Western philosophy
- School: Phenomenology, Thomism

Antonio Millán-Puelles (22 February 1921 – 22 March 2005) was a Spanish philosopher interested in phenomenology and metaphysics, who published many books and articles. He discovered his vocation to philosophy when he read Husserl’s Logical Investigations and abandoned the medical studies he had just begun.

His preferred topics were the relationship between conscience and subjectivity, the value of freedom, the ideal and the unreal being, and the rapport between metaphysics and logic. "The properly and refreshing philosophical attitude of the author is precisely made evident by the fact that he is open to the truth regardless of who stayed it. He is close to the phenomena and data of experience and analyzes them carefully and without a trace of reductionism and constructivism".

== Publications ==
Among his most important books there are:

- “El problema del ente ideal” (The Problem of the Ideal Being. A study of Hartmann and Husserl, doctoral dissertation; 1947);
- “Ontología de la existencia histórica” (The Ontology of Historical Existence, 1951);
- “Fundamentos de Filosofía” (Fundamentals of Philosophy, 1958), ISBN 84-321-3278-0;
- “La claridad en Filosofía y otros estudios” (Clarity in Philosophy and Other Essays, 1958);
- “La función social de los saberes liberales” (The Social Function of the Humanities, 1961);
- “Persona humana y justicia social” (The Human Person and Social Justice, 1961), ISBN 968-428-380-6;
- “La formación de la personalidad humana” (The Development of Human Personality, 1963), ISBN 84-321-0009-9;
- “La estructura de la subjetividad” (The Structure of Subjectivity, Ediciones Rialp, 1967). Translated to Italian; in this work he studies particularly the concept of intentionality;
- “Economía y libertad” (Economy and Freedom, 1974);
- “Sobre el hombre y la sociedad” (On Man and Society, 1976);
- “Universidad y sociedad” (The University and Society, 1976);
- “Teoría de la educación” (A Theory of Education, 1983);
- “Léxico Filosófico” (A Philosophical Lexicon, 1984), ISBN 84-321-3416-3, ISBN 978-84-321-3669-6;
- “Teoría del objeto puro” (The Theory of the Pure Object, 1990). Translated to English: Heidelberg, Universitätsverlag C. Winter 1996; ISBN 3-8253-0309-8;
- “El interés por la verdad” (The Interest for Truth, 1997);
- “La lógica de los conceptos metafísicos (2 Vols.)” (The Logic of Metaphysical Concepts, 2002);
- "La libre afirmación de nuestro ser", (The Free Affirmation of Our Being, ISBN 84-321-3028-1);
- "La inmortalidad del alma humana" (The Inmortality of the Human Soul), ISBN 978-84-321-3669-6.

His books could be divided in three main groups: those devoted to the theory of knowledge and metaphysics, those devoted to ethics and society, and educational handbooks. In all these works he studies and comments Brentano, Aristotle, Aquinas, Husserl, Kant, Hartmann, Meinong, Sartre, Heidegger, and many other ancient, medieval, and modern philosophers.
