= Daniel Stoljar =

Australian philosopher (born 1967)

Daniel Stoljar FAHA
- Born: 1967 (age 58–59)

Education
- Education: University of Sydney (BA); Massachusetts Institute of Technology (PhD)
- Thesis: The Content of Physicalism (1995)
- Doctoral advisor: Ned Block

Philosophical work
- Era: 21st-century philosophy
- Region: Western philosophy
- School: Analytic philosophy
- Institutions: University of Colorado Boulder; Australian National University
- Main interests: Philosophy of mind, metaphysics, metaethics
- Notable ideas: Phenomenal concept strategy

Daniel Stoljar (born 1967) is an Australian philosopher and Professor of Philosophy at the Australian National University. He was the President of the Australasian Association of Philosophy (2016–2017). Stoljar is known for his works on physicalism and philosophical progress.

Stoljar was elected a Fellow of the Australian Academy of the Humanities in 2010.

== Books ==
- Ignorance and imagination (2006)
- Physicalism (2010)
- Philosophical Progress: In Defence of a Reasonable Optimism (2017)
