= Thinking About Consciousness =

Book by David Papineau

- Author: David Papineau
- Language: English
- Subject: Consciousness
- Genre: Non-fiction
- Publication date: 2002

Thinking About Consciousness by David Papineau, is a book (published in 2002) about consciousness that describes what Papineau calls the 'Intuition of Distinctness'. He does not so much attempt to prove that materialism is right (although he presents his 'Causal argument' for it in the first chapter) as analyse why dualism seems intuitively plausible. He makes various propositions for future research in his book.

== Causal argument ==
In the first chapter of his book, Papineau offers the causal argument as what he considers the best argument for materialism:

1. Conscious mental occurrences have physical effects
2. All physical effects are fully caused by purely physical prior histories
3. The physical effects of conscious states are not always overdetermined by distinct causes.

Materialism follows. Although Papineau recognises that it is possible to reject these premisses, he claims that to do so leads to empirically implausible conclusions.

== Conceptual dualism ==
Not to be confused with property dualism, or ontological dualism, conceptual dualism suggests that we have two different ways of thinking about the properties of a single substance. The distinctness between these different kinds of concepts is what causes the 'intuition of distinctness', which Papineau suggests is responsible for dualism, and why it is such an attractive hypothesis.

Specifically, Papineau says that these two types of concepts are distinct, because the phenomenal concepts possess some part of the actual experience. Our concept of red includes a 'faint copy' of red, whereas our conception of the human perceptual system includes no such faint copy.

== Reaction ==
Susan Blackmore characterized Papineau's book as "definitely written for philosophers rather than psychologists or neuroscientists" because of its focus on abstruse philosophical arguments. She concludes that "Papineau has helped explain why" it's so easy for us to think there's an explanatory gap for consciousness, though she doubts that Papineau's insistence that consciousness is an inherently vague concept will dampen neuroscientific efforts to understand it better.
