= David Papineau =

British academic philosopher (born 1947)

- Born: September 30, 1947 (age 79); Como, Italy

Education
- Education: University of Natal; University of Cambridge
- Doctoral advisor: Ian Hacking
- Other advisor: D. H. Mellor

Philosophical work
- Era: Contemporary philosophy
- Region: Western philosophy
- School: Analytic philosophy
- Institutions: University of Reading; Macquarie University; Birkbeck College, London; University of Cambridge; King's College London; City University of New York
- Doctoral students: Stathis Psillos
- Main interests: Philosophy of mind, metaphysics, philosophy of science
- Notable ideas: Conceptual dualism

David Papineau (/ˈpæpɪnoʊ/; born 1947) is a British academic philosopher, born in Como, Italy. He works as Professor of Philosophy of Science at King's College London and the City University of New York Graduate Center, and previously taught for several years at Cambridge University, where he was a fellow of Robinson College.

== Biography ==
Papineau received a BSc in mathematics from the University of Natal and a BA and PhD in philosophy from the University of Cambridge under the supervision of Ian Hacking.

He has worked in metaphysics, epistemology, and the philosophies of science, mind, and mathematics. His overall stance is naturalist and realist. He is one of the originators of the teleosemantic theory of mental representation, a solution to the problem of intentionality which derives the intentional content of our beliefs from their biological purpose. He is also a defender of the a posteriori physicalist solution to the mind–body problem.

Papineau was elected president of the British Society for the Philosophy of Science for 1993–1995, of the Mind Association for 2009–2010, and of the Aristotelian Society for 2013–2014.

His book Knowing the Score (2017) is written for a general readership and looks at a number of ways in which sporting issues cast light on long-standing philosophical problems.

== Publications ==
- For Science in the Social Sciences (1978)
- Theory and Meaning (1979)
- Reality and Representation (1987)
- Philosophical Naturalism (1993)
- Introducing Consciousness (2000)
- Thinking about Consciousness (2002)
- The Roots of Reason: Philosophical Essays on Rationality, Evolution and Probability (2003)
- Philosophical Devices (2012)
- Knowing the Score (2017)
- The Metaphysics of Sensory Experience (2021)
