= W. John Hutchins =

English linguist and information scientist (1939–2021)

William John Hutchins (27 January 1939 – 9 January 2021) was an English linguist and information scientist who specialized in machine translation.

He graduated as a Bachelor of Arts in French and German at the University of Nottingham in 1960 and obtained a diploma in librarianship at University College London in 1962. He worked as assistant librarian at Durham University (1962–1965) and at the University of Sheffield (1965–1971), and then as assistant librarian (1971–1980) and sub-librarian (1980–1998) at the University of East Anglia.

In 2000 he obtained his PhD degree at the University of East Anglia. In addition to authoring numerous articles in journals and conferences about machine translation since 1963, he is particularly well known by the book An Introduction to Machine Translation (1992) which he co-authored with Harold Somers. John's service to the machine translation community, most of it after retirement, has been outstanding. After serving as editor of the UEA Papers in Linguistics, (1976–1982), he was editor of MT News International, the bulletin of the International Association for Machine Translation (1992–1997), president of the European Association for Machine Translation (1995–2004) and of the International Association for Machine Translation (1999–2001), editor of the Compendium of Translation Software (1992–2012). John leveraged his experience as a librarian and machine translation scholar and became the librarian and the historian of machine translation. In the last decades, curator of one of the best resources about machine translation, the Machine Translation Archive (archived, temporarily offline).

== Awards and recognition ==
- 2001: IAMT Award of Honour. The Association for Machine Translation recognized John's dedication twice, first with the IAMT Award of Honour (2001)
- 2013: IAMT Lifetime Achievement Award. The Association for Machine Translation recognized John's dedication for a second time.

== Selected publications ==
- Hutchins, W. John (1975). Languages of indexing and classification. A linguistic study of structures and functions. London: Peter Peregrinus.
- Hutchins, W. John (1977). On the Problem of "Aboutness" in Document Analysis. Journal of Informatics, 1, 17–35.
- Hutchins, W. John (1978). The concept of "aboutness" in subject indexing. ASLIB Proceedings, 30, 172–181.
- Hutchins, W. J., & Somers, H. L. (1992). An introduction to machine translation (Vol. 362). London: Academic Press.
- Hutchins, W. John (2006). Machine translation: history of research and use. In: Encyclopedia of Languages and Linguistics. 2nd edition, edited by Keith Brown (Oxford: Elsevier 2006), vol.7, pp. 375–383. PDF, 445KB.
- Autobibliography (archived)
