= Clare Beghtol =

- Born: 15 February 1942; Lincoln, Nebraska, United States
- Died: 3 March 2018 (aged 76)
- Education: University of Chicago, Brown University, University of Toronto
- Occupations: Classification Theorist, Educator, Editor

Clare Beghtol (15 February 1942 – 3 March 2018) was an American-born classification theorist.

Born in Lincoln, Nebraska, she studied English at the University of Chicago and American civilization at Brown University. Beghtol began teaching at what became Concordia University in 1967, then became an editor and writer. Beghtol received a master's degree in library science from the University of Toronto in 1979. She joined the Canadian Broadcasting Corporation and continued working there while earning a doctoral degree. From 1987 to 1992, Beghtol was director of research at Ketchum Canada. She taught at the University of Toronto from 1991 to 2009. In 1999, Beghtol was editor of the journal Knowledge Organization. She died on 3 March 2018.

== Selected works ==
- Beghtol, Clare (1991). The Classification of Fiction: The Development of a System Based on Theoretical Principles (PhD thesis). University of Toronto. ProQuest 303961123.
- Beghtol, Clare (Spring 2004). "Exploring New Approaches to the Organization of Knowledge: The Subject Classification of James Duff Brown". Library Trends. 52 (4): 702–718.
