= Intentionality =

Ability of the mind to form representations

Intentionality is the mental ability to refer to or represent something. Sometimes regarded as the mark of the mental, it is found in mental states like perceptions, beliefs or desires. For example, the perception of a tree has intentionality because it represents a tree to the perceiver. A central issue for theories of intentionality has been the problem of intentional inexistence: to determine the ontological status of the entities which are the objects of intentional states.

An early theory of intentionality is associated with Anselm of Canterbury's ontological argument for the existence of God, and with his tenets distinguishing between objects that exist in the understanding and objects that exist in reality. The idea fell out of discussion with the end of the medieval scholastic period, but in recent times was resurrected by empirical psychologist Franz Brentano and later adopted by contemporary phenomenological philosopher Edmund Husserl. Today, intentionality is a live concern among philosophers of mind and language. A common dispute is between naturalism, the view that intentional properties are reducible to natural properties as studied by the natural sciences, and the phenomenal intentionality theory, the view that intentionality is grounded in consciousness.

== Overview ==
The concept of intentionality was reintroduced in 19th-century contemporary philosophy by Franz Brentano (a German philosopher and psychologist who is generally regarded as the founder of act psychology, also called intentionalism) in his work Psychology from an Empirical Standpoint (1874). Brentano described intentionality as a characteristic of all acts of consciousness that are thus "psychical" or "mental" phenomena, by which they may be set apart from "physical" or "natural" phenomena.

Every mental phenomenon is characterized by what the Scholastics of the Middle Ages called the intentional (or mental) inexistence of an object, and what we might call, though not wholly unambiguously, reference to a content, direction towards an object (which is not to be understood here as meaning a thing), or immanent objectivity. Every mental phenomenon includes something as object within itself, although they do not all do so in the same way. In presentation something is presented, in judgement something is affirmed or denied, in love loved, in hate hated, in desire desired and so on. This intentional in-existence is characteristic exclusively of mental phenomena. No physical phenomenon exhibits anything like it. We could, therefore, define mental phenomena by saying that they are those phenomena which contain an object intentionally within themselves.

— Franz Brentano, Psychology from an Empirical Standpoint, edited by Linda L. McAlister (London: Routledge, 1995), p. 68.

Brentano coined the expression "intentional inexistence" to indicate the peculiar ontological status of the contents of mental phenomena. According to some interpreters the "in-" of "in-existence" is to be read as locative, i.e. as indicating that "an intended object ... exists in or has in-existence, existing not externally but in the psychological state" (Jacquette 2004, p. 102), while others are more cautious, stating: "It is not clear whether in 1874 this ... was intended to carry any ontological commitment" (Chrudzimski and Smith 2004, p. 205).

A major problem within discourse on intentionality is that participants often fail to make explicit whether or not they use the term to imply concepts such as agency or desire, i.e. whether it involves teleology. Dennett (see below) explicitly invokes teleological concepts in the "intentional stance". However, most philosophers use "intentionality" to mean something with no teleological import. Thus, a thought of a chair can be about a chair without any implication of an intention or even a belief relating to the chair. For philosophers of language, what is meant by intentionality is largely an issue of how symbols can have meaning. This lack of clarity may underpin some of the differences of view indicated below.

To bear out further the diversity of sentiment evoked from the notion of intentionality, Husserl followed on Brentano, and gave the concept of intentionality more widespread attention, both in continental and analytic philosophy. In contrast to Brentano's view, French philosopher Jean-Paul Sartre (Being and Nothingness) identified intentionality with consciousness, stating that the two were indistinguishable. German philosopher Martin Heidegger (Being and Time), defined intentionality as "care" (Sorge), a sentient condition where an individual's existence, facticity, and being in the world identifies their ontological significance, in contrast to that which is merely ontic ("thinghood").

Other 20th-century philosophers such as Gilbert Ryle and A. J. Ayer were critical of Husserl's concept of intentionality and his many layers of consciousness. Ryle insisted that perceiving is not a process, and Ayer that describing one's knowledge is not to describe mental processes. The effect of these positions is that consciousness is so fully intentional that the mental act has been emptied of all content, and that the idea of pure consciousness is that it is nothing. (Sartre also referred to "consciousness" as "nothing").

Platonist Roderick Chisholm has revived the Brentano thesis through linguistic analysis, distinguishing two parts to Brentano's concept, the ontological aspect and the psychological aspect. Chisholm's writings have attempted to summarize the suitable and unsuitable criteria of the concept since the Scholastics, arriving at a criterion of intentionality identified by the two aspects of Brentano's thesis and defined by the logical properties that distinguish language describing psychological phenomena from language describing non-psychological phenomena. Chisholm's criteria for the intentional use of sentences are: existence independence, truth-value indifference, and referential opacity.

In current artificial intelligence and philosophy of mind, intentionality is sometimes linked with questions of semantic inference, with both skeptical and supportive adherents. John Searle argued for this position with the Chinese room thought experiment, according to which no syntactic operations that occurred in a computer would provide it with semantic content. Others are more skeptical of the human ability to make such an assertion, arguing that the kind of intentionality that emerges from self-organizing networks of automata will always be undecidable because it will never be possible to make our subjective introspective experience of intentionality and decision making coincide with our objective observation of the behavior of a self-organizing machine.

== The problem of intentional inexistence ==
A central issue for theories of intentionality has been the problem of intentional inexistence: to determine the ontological status of the entities which are the objects of intentional states. This is particularly relevant for cases involving objects that have no existence outside the mind, as in the case of mere fantasies or hallucinations.

For example, assume that Mary is thinking about Superman. On the one hand, it seems that this thought is intentional: Mary is thinking about something. On the other hand, Superman does not exist. This suggests that Mary either is not thinking about something or is thinking about something that does not exist (that Superman fiction exists is beside the point). Various theories have been proposed in order to reconcile these conflicting intuitions. These theories can roughly be divided into eliminativism, relationalism, and adverbialism. Eliminativists deny that this kind of problematic mental state is possible. Relationalists try to solve the problem by interpreting intentional states as relations while Adverbialists interpret them as properties.

=== Eliminativism ===
Eliminativists deny that the example above is possible. It might seem to us and to Mary that she is thinking about something but she is not really thinking at all. Such a position could be motivated by a form of semantic externalism, the view that the meaning of a term, or in this example the content of a thought, is determined by factors external to the subject. If meaning depends on successful reference then failing to refer would result in a lack of meaning. The difficulty for such a position is to explain why it seems to Mary that she is thinking about something and how seeming to think is different from actual thinking.

=== Relationalism ===
Relationalists hold that having an intentional state involves standing in a relation to the intentional object. This is the most natural position for non-problematic cases. So if Mary perceives a tree, it could be said that a perceptual relation holds between Mary, the subject of this relation, and the tree, the object of this relation. Relations are usually assumed to be existence-entailing: the instance of a relation entails the existence of its relata. This principle rules out that people can bear relations to non-existing entities. One way to solve the problem is to deny this principle and argue for a kind of intentionality exceptionalism: that intentionality is different from all other relations in the sense that this principle does not apply to it.

A more common relationalist solution is to look for existing objects that can play the role that the non-existing object was supposed to play. Such objects are sometimes called "proxies", "traces", or "ersatz objects". It has been suggested that abstract objects or Platonic forms can play this role. Abstract objects have actual existence but they exist outside space and time. So when Mary thinks about Superman, she is standing in a thinking relation to the abstract object or the Platonic form that corresponds to Superman. A similar solution replaces abstract objects with concrete mental objects. In this case, there exists a mental object corresponding to Superman in Mary's mind. As Mary starts to think about Superman, she enters into a relationship with this mental object. One problem for both of these theories is that they seem to mischaracterize the experience of thinking. As Mary is thinking about Superman, she is neither thinking about a Platonic form outside space-time nor about a mental object. Instead, she is thinking about a concrete physical being. A related solution sees possible objects as intentional objects. This involves a commitment to modal realism, for example in the form of the Lewisian model or as envisioned by Takashi Yagisawa.

=== Adverbialism ===
Adverbialists hold that intentional states are properties of subjects. So no independent objects are needed besides the subject, which is how adverbialists avoid the problem of non-existence. This approach has been termed "adverbialism" since the object of the intentional state is seen as a modification of this state, which can be linguistically expressed through adverbs. Instead of saying that Mary is thinking about Superman, it would be more precise, according to adverbialists, to say that Mary is thinking in a superman-ly manner or that Mary is thinking superman-ly. Adverbialism has been challenged on the grounds that it puts a strain on natural language and the metaphysical insights encoded in it. Another objection is that, by treating intentional objects as mere modifications of intentional states, adverbialism loses the power to distinguish between different complex intentional contents, the so-called many-property-problem.

== Dennett's taxonomy of current theories about intentionality ==
Daniel Dennett offers a taxonomy of the current theories about intentionality in Chapter 10 of his book The Intentional Stance. Most, if not all, current theories on intentionality accept Brentano's thesis of the irreducibility of intentional idiom. From this thesis the following positions emerge:

- intentional idiom is problematic for science;
- intentional idiom is not problematic for science, which is divided into:
  - Eliminative materialism;
  - Epistemological realism;
  - Quinean double standard (see below) which is divided into:
    - adherence to Normative Principle (epistemology), which is divided into:
      - who makes an Assumption of Rationality;
      - who follows the Principle of Charity;
    - adherence to Projective Principle.

Roderick Chisholm (1956), G.E.M. Anscombe (1957), Peter Geach (1957), and Charles Taylor (1964) all adhere to the former position, namely that intentional idiom is problematic and cannot be integrated with the natural sciences. Members of this category also maintain realism in regard to intentional objects, which may imply some kind of dualism (though this is debatable).

The latter position, which maintains the unity of intentionality with the natural sciences, is further divided into three standpoints:

- Eliminative materialism, supported by W.V. Quine (1960) and Churchland (1981);
- Realism, advocated by Jerry Fodor (1975), as well as Burge, Dretske, Kripke and the early Hilary Putnam; and
- those who adhere to the Quinean double standard.

Proponents of the eliminative materialism, understand intentional idiom, such as "belief", "desire", and the like, to be replaceable either with behavioristic language (e.g. Quine) or with the language of neuroscience (e.g. Churchland).

Holders of realism argue that there is a deeper fact of the matter to both translation and belief attribution. In other words, manuals for translating one language into another cannot be set up in different yet behaviorally identical ways and ontologically there are intentional objects. Famously, Fodor has attempted to ground such realist claims about intentionality in a language of thought. Dennett comments on this issue, Fodor "attempt[s] to make these irreducible realities acceptable to the physical sciences by grounding them (somehow) in the 'syntax' of a system of physically realized mental representations" (Dennett 1987, 345).

Those who adhere to the so-called Quinean double standard (namely that ontologically there is nothing intentional, but that the language of intentionality is indispensable), accept Quine's thesis of the indeterminacy of radical translation and its implications, while the other positions so far mentioned do not. As Quine puts it, indeterminacy of radical translation is the thesis that "manuals for translating one language into another can be set up in divergent ways, all compatible with the totality of speech dispositions, yet incompatible with one another" (Quine 1960, 27). Quine (1960) and Wilfrid Sellars (1958) both comment on this intermediary position. One such implication would be that there is, in principle, no deeper fact of the matter that could settle two interpretative strategies on what belief to attribute to a physical system. In other words, the behavior (including speech dispositions) of any physical system, in theory, could be interpreted by two different predictive strategies and both would be equally warranted in their belief attribution. This category can be seen to be a medial position between the realists and the eliminativists since it attempts to blend attributes of both into a theory of intentionality. Dennett, for example, argues in True Believers (1981) that intentional idiom (or "folk psychology") is a predictive strategy and if such a strategy successfully and voluminously predicts the actions of a physical system, then that physical system can be said to have those beliefs attributed to it. Dennett calls this predictive strategy the intentional stance.

They are further divided into two theses:

- adherence to the Normative Principle
- adherence to the Projective Principle

Advocates of the former, the Normative Principle, argue that attributions of intentional idioms to physical systems should be the propositional attitudes that the physical system ought to have in those circumstances (Dennett 1987, 342). However, exponents of this view are still further divided into those who make an Assumption of Rationality and those who adhere to the Principle of Charity. Dennett (1969, 1971, 1975), Cherniak (1981, 1986), and the more recent work of Putnam (1983) recommend the Assumption of Rationality, which unsurprisingly assumes that the physical system in question is rational. Donald Davidson (1967, 1973, 1974, 1985) and Lewis (1974) defend the Principle of Charity.

The latter is advocated by Grandy (1973) and Stich (1980, 1981, 1983, 1984), who maintain that attributions of intentional idioms to any physical system (e.g. humans, artifacts, non-human animals, etc.) should be the propositional attitude (e.g. "belief", "desire", etc.) that one would suppose one would have in the same circumstances (Dennett 1987, 343).

== Basic intentionality types according to Le Morvan ==
Working on the intentionality of vision, belief, and knowledge, Pierre Le Morvan (2005) has distinguished between three basic kinds of intentionality that he dubs "transparent", "translucent", and "opaque" respectively. The threefold distinction may be explained as follows. Let's call the "intendum" what an intentional state is about, and the "intender" the subject who is in the intentional state. An intentional state is transparent if it satisfies the following two conditions: (i) it is genuinely relational in that it entails the existence of not just the intender but the intendum as well, and (ii) substitutivity of identicals applies to the intendum (i.e. if the intentional state is about a, and a = b, then the intentional state is about b as well). An intentional state is translucent if it satisfies (i) but not (ii). An intentional state is opaque if it satisfies neither (i) nor (ii).

== Intentionalism ==
Intentionalism is the thesis that all mental states are intentional, i.e. that they are about something: about their intentional object. This thesis has also been referred to as "representationalism". Intentionalism is entailed by Brentano's claim that intentionality is "the mark of the mental": if all and only mental states are intentional then it is surely the case that all mental states are intentional.

Discussions of intentionalism often focus on the intentionality of conscious states. One can distinguish in such states their phenomenal features, or what it is like for a subject to have such a state, from their intentional features, or what they are about. These two features seem to be closely related to each other, which is why intentionalists have proposed various theories in order to capture the exact form of this relatedness.

=== Forms of intentionalism ===
These theories can roughly be divided into three categories: pure intentionalism, impure intentionalism, and qualia theories. Both pure and impure intentionalism hold that there is a supervenience relation between phenomenal features and intentional features, for example, that two intentional states cannot differ regarding their phenomenal features without differing at the same time in their intentional features. Qualia theories, on the other hand, assert that among the phenomenal features of a mental state there are at least some non-intentional phenomenal properties, so-called "Qualia", which are not determined by intentional features. Pure and impure intentionalism disagree with each other concerning which intentional features are responsible for determining the phenomenal features. Pure intentionalists hold that only intentional content is responsible, while impure intentionalists assert that the manner or mode how this content is presented also plays a role.

Tim Crane, himself an impure intentionalist, explains this difference by distinguishing three aspects of intentional states: the intentional object, the intentional content, and the intentional mode. For example, seeing that an apple is round and tasting that this apple is sweet both have the same intentional object: the apple. But they involve different contents: the visual perception ascribes the property of roundness to the apple while the gustatory perception ascribes the property of sweetness to the apple. Touching the apple will also result in a perceptual experience ascribing roundness to the apple, but the roundness is presented in a different manner. So the visual perception and the haptic perception agree in both intentional object and intentional content but differ in intentional mode. Pure intentionalists may not agree with this distinction. They may argue, for example, that the difference in the last case also belongs to intentional content, because two different properties are ascribed to the apple: seen-roundness and felt-roundness.

=== Mental states without intentionality ===
Critics of intentionalism, so-called anti-intentionalists, have proposed various apparent counterexamples to intentionalism: states that are considered mental but lack intentionality.

Some anti-intentionalist theories, such as that of Ned Block, are based on the argument that phenomenal conscious experience or qualia is also a vital component of consciousness, and that it is not intentional. (The latter claim is itself disputed by Michael Tye.)

Another form of anti-intentionalism associated with John Searle regards phenomenality itself, not intentionality, as the "mark of the mental" and thereby sidelines intentionality, since such anti-intentionalists "might accept the thesis that intentionality coincides with the mental, but they hold the view that intentionality derives from consciousness".

A further form argues that some unusual states of consciousness are non-intentional, although an individual might live a lifetime without experiencing them. Robert K.C. Forman argues that some of the unusual states of consciousness typical of mystical experience are pure consciousness events in which awareness exists, but has no object, is not awareness "of" anything.

== Phenomenal intentionality ==
Phenomenal intentionality is the type of intentionality grounded in phenomenal or conscious mental states. It contrasts with non-phenomenal intentionality, which is often ascribed to e.g. language and unconscious states. The distinction is important to philosophers who hold that phenomenal intentionality has a privileged status over non-phenomenal intentionality. This position is known as the phenomenal intentionality theory. This privileged status can take two forms. In the moderate version, phenomenal intentionality is privileged because other types of intentionality depend on it or are grounded in it. They are therefore not intrinsically intentional. The stronger version goes further and denies that there are other types of intentionality. Phenomenal intentionality theory is commonly contrasted with naturalism about intentionality, the view that intentional properties are reducible to natural properties as studied by the natural sciences.

== Intentionality and self-consciousness ==
Several authors have attempted to construct philosophical models describing how intentionality relates to the human capacity to be self-conscious. Cedric Evans contributed greatly to the discussion with his "The Subject of Self-Consciousness" in 1970. He centered his model on the idea that executive attention need not be propositional in form.

== See also ==
- Aboutness
- Héctor-Neri Castañeda
- Collective intentionality
- Directedness
- Georges Dreyfus
- Alexius Meinong
- Ruth Millikan
- Mind–body problem
- Thomas Nagel
- Antonio Millan-Puelles
- Self-awareness
- Shared intentionality
- Superintelligence
