= Thought =

Cognitive process independent of the senses

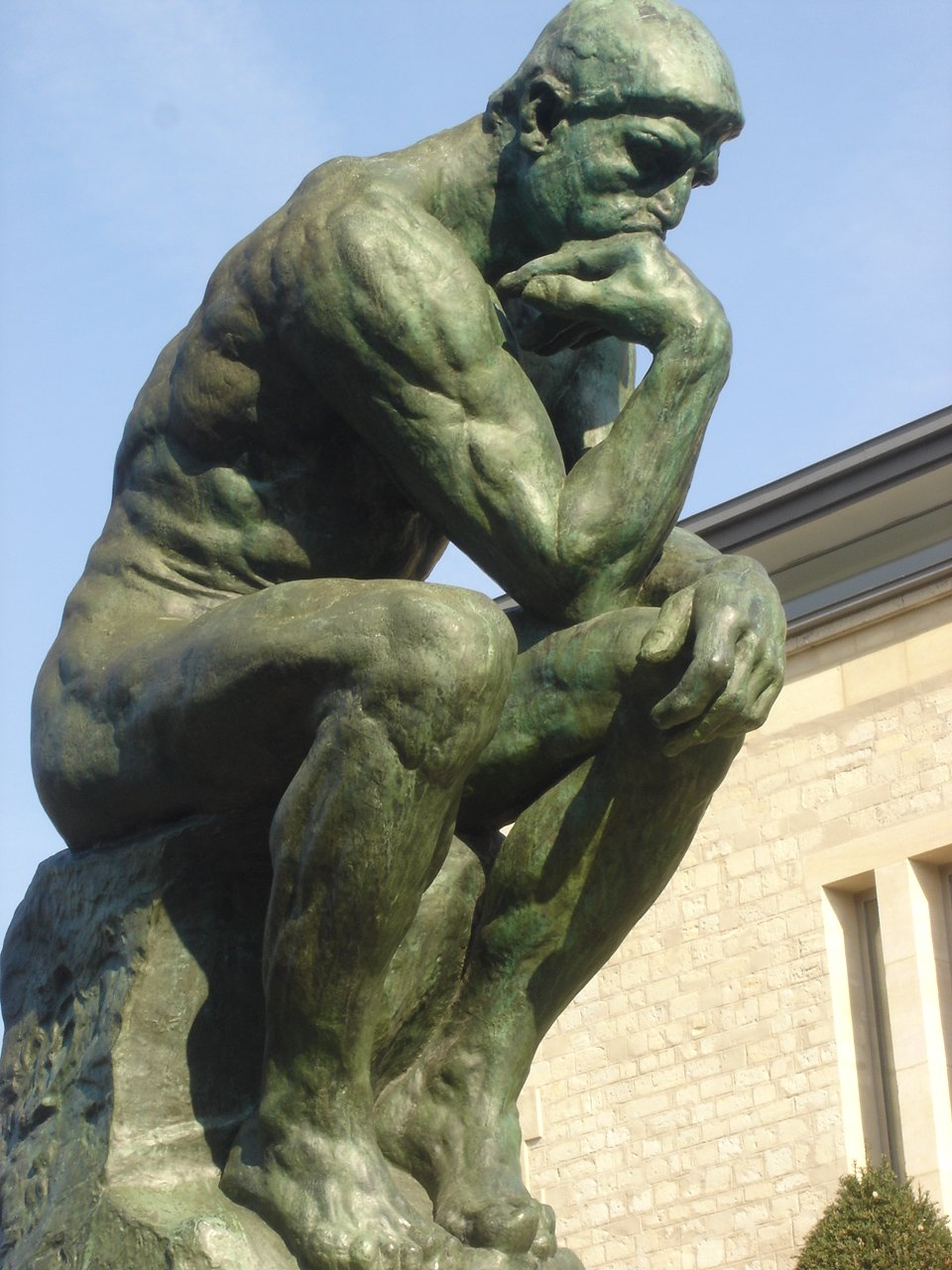
The Thinker by Auguste Rodin (1840–1917) in the garden of the Musée Rodin, Paris

Thought, or thinking, is a cognitive process in which the mind considers, creates, or manipulates ideas, representations, or information. Core forms include judging, reasoning, concept formation, problem solving, and deliberation. Other processes, such as entertaining an idea, memory, or imagination, are also frequently considered types of thought. Thought may arise in response to perception, but can also occur without immediate input from the sensory organs. In a broader sense, any mental event—including perception and unconscious processes—may be described as forms of thought. The term can also denote not the process itself, but the resulting mental states or systems of ideas.

A variety of theories attempt to explain the nature of thinking. Platonism holds that thought involves discerning eternal forms and their interrelations, distinguishing these pure entities from their imperfect sensory imitations. Aristotelianism interprets thinking as instantiating the universal essence of an object within the mind, derived from sense experience rather than a changeless realm. Conceptualism, closely related to Aristotelianism, identifies thinking with the mental evocation of concepts. Inner speech theories suggest that thought takes the form of silent verbal expression, sometimes in a natural language and sometimes in a specialized "mental language," or Mentalese, as proposed by the language of thought hypothesis. Associationism views thought as the succession of ideas governed by laws of association, while behaviorism reduces thinking to behavioral dispositions that generate intelligent actions in response to stimuli. More recently, computationalism compares thought to information processing, storage, and transmission in computers.

Different types of thinking are recognized in philosophy and psychology. Judgement involves affirming or denying a proposition; reasoning draws conclusions from premises or evidence. Both depend on concepts acquired through concept formation. Problem-solving aims at achieving specific goals by overcoming obstacles, while deliberation evaluates possible courses of action before selecting one. Episodic memory and imagination internally represent objects or events, either as faithful reproductions or novel rearrangements. Unconscious thought refers to mental activity that occurs without conscious awareness and is sometimes invoked to explain solutions reached without deliberate effort.

The study of thought spans many disciplines. Phenomenology, for example, examines the subjective experience of thinking, while metaphysics addresses how mental processes relate to matter in a naturalistic framework. Cognitive psychology treats thought as information processing, whereas developmental psychology explores its growth from infancy to adulthood. Psychoanalysis emphasizes unconscious processes, and fields such as linguistics, neuroscience, artificial intelligence, biology, and sociology also investigate different aspects of thought. Related concepts include the classical laws of thought (identity, non-contradiction, excluded middle), counterfactual thinking (imagining alternatives to reality), thought experiments (testing theories through hypothetical scenarios), critical thinking (reflective evaluation of beliefs and actions), and positive thinking (focusing on beneficial aspects of situations, often linked to optimism).

== Definition ==
The terms "thought" and "thinking" are used in different ways in psychology and philosophy. In their most common sense, they refer to conscious processes that occur independently of direct sensory input. This includes activities such as considering an idea, evaluating a proposition, or making a judgement. In this sense, memory and imagination count as forms of thought, while perception does not. In a narrower sense, only the most typical cases are called thought-specifically conscious, conceptual or linguistic processes such as judging, inferring, problem-solving, and deliberating. Sometimes, however, the terms are understood in a much broader sense to include all mental processes, conscious or unconscious. In this wide usage, they can be treated as synonymous with mind, as in the Cartesian tradition (where the mind is described as a "thinking thing") and in the cognitive sciences. Some accounts further add that only processes leading to intelligent behavior should count as thought. A common contrast in the literature is drawn between thinking and feeling. In this distinction, thinking is seen as a rational, dispassionate activity, while feeling involves direct emotional engagement.

The words thought and thinking can also refer to the results of these processes, such as beliefs, mental states, or systems of ideas held by an individual or shared within a group. Academic discussions often leave implicit which of these senses is intended.

The word thought derives from Old English þoht or geþoht, from the stem of þencan ("to conceive in the mind, consider").

== Theories of thinking ==
Many different theories of thinking have been developed. They attempt to describe the main features and processes involved in thinking. These theories are not necessarily mutually exclusive, meaning that some of them can be combined without contradiction.

=== Platonism ===
According to Platonism, thinking is a spiritual activity in which the mind perceives and examines Platonic forms and their relationships. This process is described as a kind of silent inner dialogue, where the soul "talks to itself." Platonic forms are understood as universals that exist in a changeless, non-physical realm, distinct from the sensory world. Examples include the forms of goodness, beauty, unity, and sameness. The challenge of thinking, in this view, lies in recognizing and distinguishing these true forms from the imperfect copies and imitations found in the physical world. For instance, one must separate the idea of beauty itself from mere beautiful objects. A central difficulty for this theory is explaining how humans can think about or learn these transcendent forms if they exist in a different realm. Plato addresses this issue with his theory of recollection, which claims that the soul was once in direct contact with the forms before birth and can therefore "remember" them. However, this solution relies on metaphysical assumptions that are not widely accepted in modern philosophy.

=== Aristotelianism and conceptualism ===
According to Aristotelianism, the mind thinks about an object by instantiating its essence. For example, when thinking about trees, the mind instantiates "tree-ness." Unlike actual trees, this instantiation does not occur in matter but in the mind, though the universal essence is the same in both cases. In contrast with Platonism, universals are not seen as timeless forms existing in a separate intelligible realm. Instead, they exist only insofar as they are instantiated. The mind comes to recognize universals through abstraction from experience, a view that avoids some objections directed against Platonism.

Conceptualism is closely related. It holds that thinking consists in mentally evoking concepts. While some concepts may be innate, most are acquired through abstraction from sensory experience before they can be used in thought.

Critics argue that both theories face difficulties. One problem is explaining the logical structure of thought. For instance, to think that it will either rain or snow, it is not enough to instantiate the essences of rain and snow or to evoke the relevant concepts. The disjunctive relation between them is not captured in this way. Another challenge lies in providing a clear account of how the mind acquires essences or concepts through abstraction.

=== Inner speech theory ===
Inner speech theories hold that thinking is a form of inner speech. This position, sometimes called psychological nominalism, maintains that thinking consists of silently evoking words and connecting them to form mental sentences. A person's awareness of their own thoughts is explained as a kind of overhearing of one's silent monologue. Three central features are often associated with inner speech: it is in some sense similar to hearing sounds, it involves the use of language, and it constitutes a motor plan that could be used for actual speech. The link between thinking and language is supported by evidence that thinking is often accompanied by muscle activity in the speech organs. Such activity may facilitate thought in certain cases but is not required for thinking in general. Some versions of the theory propose that thinking does not occur in ordinary languages like English or French but in a specialized symbolic system with its own syntax. This is known as the language of thought hypothesis.

Inner speech theory has strong intuitive appeal since introspection suggests that many thoughts are accompanied by inner speech. Critics argue, however, that not all forms of thinking are linguistic. Daydreaming, for example, has been cited as a case of non-linguistic thought. This debate is significant for the question of whether animals can think. If thinking necessarily depends on language, then there is a sharp divide between humans and other animals, since only humans possess sufficiently complex languages. But if non-linguistic thought exists, then this gap may be smaller, suggesting that some animals are capable of thought as well.

==== Language of thought hypothesis ====
There are various theories about the relation between language and thought. One prominent version in contemporary philosophy is called the language of thought hypothesis. It states that thinking happens in the medium of a mental language. This language, often referred to as Mentalese, is similar to regular languages in various respects: it is composed of words that are connected to each other in syntactic ways to form sentences. This claim does not merely rest on an intuitive analogy between language and thought. Instead, it provides a clear definition of the features a representational system has to embody in order to have a linguistic structure. On the level of syntax, the representational system has to possess two types of representations: atomic and compound representations. Atomic representations are basic whereas compound representations are constituted either by other compound representations or by atomic representations. On the level of semantics, the semantic content or the meaning of the compound representations should depend on the semantic contents of its constituents. A representational system is linguistically structured if it fulfills these two requirements.

The language of thought hypothesis states that the same is true for thinking in general. This would mean that thought is composed of certain atomic representational constituents that can be combined as described above. Apart from this abstract characterization, no further concrete claims are made about how human thought is implemented by the brain or which other similarities to natural language it has. The language of thought hypothesis was first introduced by Jerry Fodor. He argues in favor of this claim by holding that it constitutes the best explanation of the characteristic features of thinking. One of these features is productivity: a system of representations is productive if it can generate an infinite number of unique representations based on a low number of atomic representations. This applies to thought since human beings are capable of entertaining an infinite number of distinct thoughts even though their mental capacities are quite limited. Other characteristic features of thinking include systematicity and inferential coherence. Fodor argues that the language of thought hypothesis is true as it explains how thought can have these features and because there is no good alternative explanation. Some arguments against the language of thought hypothesis are based on neural networks, which are able to produce intelligent behavior without depending on representational systems. Other objections focus on the idea that some mental representations happen non-linguistically, for example, in the form of maps or images.

Computationalists have been especially interested in the language of thought hypothesis since it provides ways to close the gap between thought in the human brain and computational processes implemented by computers. The reason for this is that processes over representations that respect syntax and semantics, like inferences according to the modus ponens, can be implemented by physical systems using causal relations. The same linguistic systems may be implemented through different material systems, like brains or computers. In this way, computers can think.

=== Associationism ===
An important view in the empiricist tradition has been associationism, the view that thinking consists in the succession of ideas or images. This succession is seen as being governed by laws of association, which determine how the train of thought unfolds. These laws are different from logical relations between the contents of thoughts, which are found in the case of drawing inferences by moving from the thought of the premises to the thought of the conclusion. Various laws of association have been suggested. According to the laws of similarity and contrast, ideas tend to evoke other ideas that are either very similar to them or their opposite. The law of contiguity, on the other hand, states that if two ideas were frequently experienced together, then the experience of one tends to cause the experience of the other. In this sense, the history of an organism's experience determines which thoughts the organism has and how these thoughts unfold. But such an association does not guarantee that the connection is meaningful or rational. For example, because of the association between the terms "cold" and "Idaho", the thought "this coffee shop is cold" might lead to the thought "Russia should annex Idaho".

One form of associationism is imagism. It states that thinking involves entertaining a sequence of images where earlier images conjure up later images based on the laws of association. One problem with this view is that we can think about things that we cannot imagine. This is especially relevant when the thought involves very complex objects or infinities, which is common, for example, in mathematical thought. One criticism directed at associationism in general is that its claim is too far-reaching. There is wide agreement that associative processes as studied by associationists play some role in how thought unfolds. But the claim that this mechanism is sufficient to understand all thought or all mental processes is usually not accepted.

=== Behaviorism ===
According to behaviorism, thinking consists in behavioral dispositions to engage in certain publicly observable behavior as a reaction to particular external stimuli. On this view, having a particular thought is the same as having a disposition to behave in a certain way. This view is often motivated by empirical considerations: it is very difficult to study thinking as a private mental process but it is much easier to study how organisms react to a certain situation with a given behavior. In this sense, the capacity to solve problems not through existing habits but through creative new approaches is particularly relevant. The term "behaviorism" is also sometimes used in a slightly different sense when applied to thinking to refer to a specific form of inner speech theory. This view focuses on the idea that the relevant inner speech is a derivative form of regular outward speech. This sense overlaps with how behaviorism is understood more commonly in philosophy of mind since these inner speech acts are not observed by the researcher but merely inferred from the subject's intelligent behavior. This remains true to the general behaviorist principle that behavioral evidence is required for any psychological hypothesis.

One problem for behaviorism is that the same entity often behaves differently despite being in the same situation as before. This problem consists in the fact that individual thoughts or mental states usually do not correspond to one particular behavior. So thinking that the pie is tasty does not automatically lead to eating the pie, since various other mental states may still inhibit this behavior, for example, the belief that it would be impolite to do so or that the pie is poisoned.

=== Computationalism ===
Computationalist theories of thinking, often found in the cognitive sciences, understand thinking as a form of information processing. These views have a forerunner in the mechanistic philosophy of Thomas Hobbes and developed with the rise of computers in the second part of the 20th century, when various theorists saw thinking in analogy to computer operations. On such views, the information may be encoded differently in the brain, but in principle, the same operations take place there as well, corresponding to the storage, transmission, and processing of information. But while this analogy has some intuitive attraction, theorists have struggled to give a more explicit explanation of what computation is. A further problem consists in explaining the sense in which thinking is a form of computing.

The traditionally dominant view defines computation in terms of Turing machines, though contemporary accounts often focus on neural networks for their analogies. A Turing machine is capable of executing any algorithm based on a few very basic principles, such as reading a symbol from a cell, writing a symbol to a cell, and executing instructions based on the symbols read. This way it is possible to perform deductive reasoning following the inference rules of formal logic as well as simulating many other functions of the mind, such as language processing, decision making, and motor control. But computationalism does not only claim that thinking is in some sense similar to computation. Instead, it is claimed that thinking just is a form of computation or that the mind is a Turing machine.

Computationalist theories of thought are sometimes divided into functionalist and representationalist approaches. Functionalist approaches define mental states through their causal roles but allow both external and internal events in their causal network. Thought may be seen as a form of program that can be executed in the same way by many different systems, including humans, animals, and even robots. According to one such view, whether something is a thought only depends on its role "in producing further internal states and verbal outputs". Representationalism, on the other hand, focuses on the representational features of mental states and defines thoughts as sequences of intentional mental states. In this sense, computationalism is often combined with the language of thought hypothesis by interpreting these sequences as symbols whose order is governed by syntactic rules.

Various arguments have been raised against computationalism. In one sense, it seems trivial since almost any physical system can be described as executing computations and therefore as thinking. For example, it has been argued that the molecular movements in a regular wall can be understood as computing an algorithm since they are "isomorphic to the formal structure of the program" in question under the right interpretation. This would lead to the implausible conclusion that the wall is thinking. Another objection focuses on the idea that computationalism captures only some aspects of thought but is unable to account for other crucial aspects of human cognition.

== Types of thinking ==
A great variety of types of thinking are discussed in the academic literature. A common approach divides them into those forms that aim at the creation of theoretical knowledge and those that aim at producing actions or correct decisions, but there is no universally accepted taxonomy summarizing all these types.

=== Entertaining, judging, and reasoning ===
Thinking is often identified with the act of judging. A judgment is a mental operation in which a proposition is evoked and then either affirmed or denied. It involves deciding what to believe and aims at determining whether the judged proposition is true or false. Various theories of judgment have been proposed. The traditionally dominant approach is the combination theory. It states that judgments consist in the combination of concepts. On this view, to judge that "all men are mortal" is to combine the concepts "man" and "mortal". The same concepts can be combined in different ways, corresponding to different forms of judgment, for example, as "some men are mortal" or "no man is mortal".

Other theories of judgment focus more on the relation between the judged proposition and reality. According to Franz Brentano, a judgment is either a belief or a disbelief in the existence of some entity. In this sense, there are only two fundamental forms of judgment: "A exists" and "A does not exist". When applied to the sentence "all men are mortal", the entity in question is "immortal men", of whom it is said that they do not exist. Important for Brentano is the distinction between the mere representation of the content of the judgment and the affirmation or the denial of the content. The mere representation of a proposition is often referred to as "entertaining a proposition". This is the case, for example, when one considers a proposition but has not yet made up one's mind about whether it is true or false. The term "thinking" can refer both to judging and to mere entertaining. This difference is often explicit in the way the thought is expressed: "thinking that" usually involves a judgment whereas "thinking about" refers to the neutral representation of a proposition without an accompanying belief. In this case, the proposition is merely entertained but not yet judged. Some forms of thinking may involve the representation of objects without any propositions, as when someone is thinking about their grandmother.

Reasoning is one of the most paradigmatic forms of thinking. It is the process of drawing conclusions from premises or evidence. Types of reasoning can be divided into deductive and non-deductive reasoning. Deductive reasoning is governed by certain rules of inference, which guarantee the truth of the conclusion if the premises are true. For example, given the premises "all men are mortal" and "Socrates is a man", it follows deductively that "Socrates is mortal". Non-deductive reasoning, also referred to as defeasible reasoning or non-monotonic reasoning, is still rationally compelling but the truth of the conclusion is not ensured by the truth of the premises. Induction is one form of non-deductive reasoning, for example, when one concludes that "the sun will rise tomorrow" based on one's experiences of all the previous days. Other forms of non-deductive reasoning include the inference to the best explanation and analogical reasoning.

Fallacies are faulty forms of thinking that go against the norms of correct reasoning. Formal fallacies concern faulty inferences found in deductive reasoning. Denying the antecedent is one type of formal fallacy, for example, "If Othello is a bachelor, then he is male. Othello is not a bachelor. Therefore, Othello is not male". Informal fallacies, on the other hand, apply to all types of reasoning. The source of their flaw is to be found in the content or the context of the argument. This is often caused by ambiguous or vague expressions in natural language, as in "Feathers are light. What is light cannot be dark. Therefore, feathers cannot be dark". An important aspect of fallacies is that they seem to be rationally compelling on the first look and thereby seduce people into accepting and committing them. Whether an act of reasoning constitutes a fallacy does not depend on whether the premises are true or false but on their relation to the conclusion and, in some cases, on the context.

=== Concept formation ===
Concepts are general notions that constitute the fundamental building blocks of thought. They are rules that govern how objects are sorted into different classes. A person can only think about a proposition if they possess the concepts involved in this proposition. For example, the proposition "wombats are animals" involves the concepts "wombat" and "animal". Someone who does not possess the concept "wombat" may still be able to read the sentence but cannot entertain the corresponding proposition. Concept formation is a form of thinking in which new concepts are acquired. It involves becoming familiar with the characteristic features shared by all instances of the corresponding type of entity and developing the ability to identify positive and negative cases. This process usually corresponds to learning the meaning of the word associated with the type in question. There are various theories concerning how concepts and concept possession are to be understood. The use of metaphor may aid in the processes of concept formation.

According to one popular view, concepts are to be understood in terms of abilities. On this view, two central aspects characterize concept possession: the ability to discriminate between positive and negative cases and the ability to draw inferences from this concept to related concepts. Concept formation corresponds to acquiring these abilities. It has been suggested that animals are also able to learn concepts to some extent, due to their ability to discriminate between different types of situations and to adjust their behavior accordingly.

=== Problem solving ===
In the case of problem solving, thinking aims at reaching a predefined goal by overcoming certain obstacles. This process often involves two different forms of thinking. On the one hand, divergent thinking aims at coming up with as many alternative solutions as possible. On the other hand, convergent thinking tries to narrow down the range of alternatives to the most promising candidates. Some researchers identify various steps in the process of problem solving. These steps include recognizing the problem, trying to understand its nature, identifying general criteria the solution should meet, deciding how these criteria should be prioritized, monitoring the progress, and evaluating the results.

An important distinction concerns the type of problem that is faced. For well-structured problems, it is easy to determine which steps need to be taken to solve them, but executing these steps may still be difficult. For ill-structured problems, on the other hand, it is not clear what steps need to be taken, i.e. there is no clear formula that would lead to success if followed correctly. In this case, the solution may sometimes come in a flash of insight in which the problem is suddenly seen in a new light. Another way to categorize different forms of problem solving is by distinguishing between algorithms and heuristics. An algorithm is a formal procedure in which each step is clearly defined. It guarantees success if applied correctly. The long multiplication usually taught in school is an example of an algorithm for solving the problem of multiplying big numbers. Heuristics, on the other hand, are informal procedures. They are rough rules-of-thumb that tend to bring the thinker closer to the solution but success is not guaranteed in every case even if followed correctly. Examples of heuristics are working forward and working backward. These approaches involve planning one step at a time, either starting at the beginning and moving forward or starting at the end and moving backward. So when planning a trip, one could plan the different stages of the trip from origin to destiny in the chronological order of how the trip will be realized, or in the reverse order.

Obstacles to problem solving can arise from the thinker's failure to take certain possibilities into account by fixating on one specific course of action. There are important differences between how novices and experts solve problems. For example, experts tend to allocate more time for conceptualizing the problem and work with more complex representations whereas novices tend to devote more time to executing putative solutions.

=== Deliberation and decision ===
Deliberation is an important form of practical thinking. It aims at formulating possible courses of action and assessing their value by considering the reasons for and against them. This involves foresight to anticipate what might happen. Based on this foresight, different courses of action can be formulated in order to influence what will happen. Decisions are an important part of deliberation. They are about comparing alternative courses of action and choosing the most favorable one. Decision theory is a formal model of how ideal rational agents would make decisions. It is based on the idea that they should always choose the alternative with the highest expected value. Each alternative can lead to various possible outcomes, each of which has a different value. The expected value of an alternative consists in the sum of the values of each outcome associated with it multiplied by the probability that this outcome occurs. According to decision theory, a decision is rational if the agent chooses the alternative associated with the highest expected value, as assessed from the agent's own perspective.

Various theorists emphasize the practical nature of thought, i.e. that thinking is usually guided by some kind of task it aims to solve. In this sense, thinking has been compared to trial-and-error seen in animal behavior when faced with a new problem. On this view, the important difference is that this process happens inwardly as a form of simulation. This process is often much more efficient since once the solution is found in thought, only the behavior corresponding to the found solution has to be outwardly carried out and not all the others.

=== Episodic memory and imagination ===
When thinking is understood in a wide sense, it includes both episodic memory and imagination. In episodic memory, events one experienced in the past are relived. It is a form of mental time travel in which the past experience is re-experienced. But this does not constitute an exact copy of the original experience since the episodic memory involves additional aspects and information not present in the original experience. This includes both a feeling of familiarity and chronological information about the past event in relation to the present. Memory aims at representing how things actually were in the past, in contrast to imagination, which presents objects without aiming to show how things actually are or were. Because of this missing link to actuality, more freedom is involved in most forms of imagination: its contents can be freely varied, changed, and recombined to create new arrangements never experienced before. Episodic memory and imagination have in common with other forms of thought that they can arise internally without any stimulation of the sensory organs. But they are still closer to sensation than more abstract forms of thought since they present sensory contents that could, at least in principle, also be perceived.

=== Unconscious thought ===
Conscious thought is the paradigmatic form of thinking and is often the focus of the corresponding research. But it has been argued that some forms of thought also happen on the unconscious level. Unconscious thought is thought that happens in the background without being experienced. It is therefore not observed directly. Instead, its existence is usually inferred by other means. For example, when someone is faced with an important decision or a difficult problem, they may not be able to solve it straight away. But then, at a later time, the solution may suddenly flash before them even though no conscious steps of thinking were taken towards this solution in the meantime. In such cases, the cognitive labor needed to arrive at a solution is often explained in terms of unconscious thoughts. The central idea is that a cognitive transition happened and we need to posit unconscious thoughts to be able to explain how it happened.

It has been argued that conscious and unconscious thoughts differ not just concerning their relation to experience but also concerning their capacities. According to unconscious thought theorists, for example, conscious thought excels at simple problems with few variables but is outperformed by unconscious thought when complex problems with many variables are involved. This is sometimes explained through the claim that the number of items one can consciously think about at the same time is rather limited whereas unconscious thought lacks such limitations. But other researchers have rejected the claim that unconscious thought is often superior to conscious thought. Other suggestions for the difference between the two forms of thinking include that conscious thought tends to follow formal logical laws while unconscious thought relies more on associative processing and that only conscious thinking is conceptually articulated and happens through the medium of language.

== In various disciplines ==
=== Phenomenology ===
Phenomenology is the science of the structure and contents of experience. The term "cognitive phenomenology" refers to the experiential character of thinking or what it feels like to think. Some theorists claim that there is no distinctive cognitive phenomenology. On such a view, the experience of thinking is just one form of sensory experience. According to one version, thinking just involves hearing a voice internally. According to another, there is no experience of thinking apart from the indirect effects thinking has on sensory experience. A weaker version of such an approach allows that thinking may have a distinct phenomenology but contends that thinking still depends on sensory experience because it cannot occur on its own. On this view, sensory contents constitute the foundation from which thinking may arise.

An often-cited thought experiment in favor of the existence of a distinctive cognitive phenomenology involves two persons listening to a radio broadcast in French, one who understands French and the other who does not. The idea behind this example is that both listeners hear the same sounds and therefore have the same non-cognitive experience. In order to explain the difference, a distinctive cognitive phenomenology has to be posited: only the experience of the first person has this additional cognitive character since it is accompanied by a thought that corresponds to the meaning of what is said. Other arguments for the experience of thinking focus on the direct introspective access to thinking or on the thinker's knowledge of their own thoughts.

Phenomenologists are also concerned with the characteristic features of the experience of thinking. Making a judgment is one of the prototypical forms of cognitive phenomenology. It involves epistemic agency, in which a proposition is entertained, evidence for and against it is considered, and, based on this reasoning, the proposition is either affirmed or rejected. It is sometimes argued that the experience of truth is central to thinking, i.e. that thinking aims at representing how the world is. It shares this feature with perception but differs from it in the way how it represents the world: without the use of sensory contents.

One of the characteristic features often ascribed to thinking and judging is that they are predicative experiences, in contrast to the pre-predicative experience found in immediate perception. On such a view, various aspects of perceptual experience resemble judgments without being judgments in the strict sense. For example, the perceptual experience of the front of a house brings with it various expectations about aspects of the house not directly seen, like the size and shape of its other sides. This process is sometimes referred to as apperception. These expectations resemble judgments and can be wrong. This would be the case when it turns out upon walking around the "house" that it is no house at all but only a front facade of a house with nothing behind it. In this case, the perceptual expectations are frustrated and the perceiver is surprised. There is disagreement as to whether these pre-predicative aspects of regular perception should be understood as a form of cognitive phenomenology involving thinking. This issue is also important for understanding the relation between thought and language. The reason for this is that the pre-predicative expectations do not depend on language, which is sometimes taken as an example for non-linguistic thought. Various theorists have argued that pre-predicative experience is more basic or fundamental since predicative experience is in some sense built on top of it and therefore depends on it.

Another way how phenomenologists have tried to distinguish the experience of thinking from other types of experiences is in relation to empty intentions in contrast to intuitive intentions. In this context, "intention" means that some kind of object is experienced. In intuitive intentions, the object is presented through sensory contents. Empty intentions, on the other hand, present their object in a more abstract manner without the help of sensory contents. So when perceiving a sunset, it is presented through sensory contents. The same sunset can also be presented non-intuitively when merely thinking about it without the help of sensory contents. In these cases, the same properties are ascribed to objects. The difference between these modes of presentation concerns not what properties are ascribed to the presented object but how the object is presented. Because of this commonality, it is possible for representations belonging to different modes to overlap or to diverge. For example, when searching one's glasses one may think to oneself that one left them on the kitchen table. This empty intention of the glasses lying on the kitchen table are then intuitively fulfilled when one sees them lying there upon arriving in the kitchen. This way, a perception can confirm or refute a thought depending on whether the empty intuitions are later fulfilled or not.

=== Metaphysics ===
The mind–body problem concerns the explanation of the relationship that exists between minds, or mental processes, and bodily states or processes. The main aim of philosophers working in this area is to determine the nature of the mind and mental states/processes, and how—or even if—minds are affected by and can affect the body.

Human perceptual experiences depend on stimuli which arrive at one's various sensory organs from the external world and these stimuli cause changes in one's mental state, ultimately causing one to feel a sensation, which may be pleasant or unpleasant. Someone's desire for a slice of pizza, for example, will tend to cause that person to move his or her body in a specific manner and in a specific direction to obtain what he or she wants. The question, then, is how it can be possible for conscious experiences to arise out of a lump of gray matter endowed with nothing but electrochemical properties. A related problem is to explain how someone's propositional attitudes (e.g. beliefs and desires) can cause that individual's neurons to fire and his muscles to contract in exactly the correct manner. These comprise some of the puzzles that have confronted epistemologists and philosophers of mind from at least the time of René Descartes.

The above reflects a classical, functional description of how we work as cognitive, thinking systems. However the apparently irresolvable mind–body problem is said to be overcome, and bypassed, by the embodied cognition approach, with its roots in the work of Heidegger, Piaget, Vygotsky, Merleau-Ponty and the pragmatist John Dewey.

This approach states that the classical approach of separating the mind and analysing its processes is misguided: instead, we should see that the mind, actions of an embodied agent, and the environment it perceives and envisions, are all parts of a whole which determine each other. Therefore, functional analysis of the mind alone will always leave us with the mind–body problem which cannot be solved.

=== Psychology ===
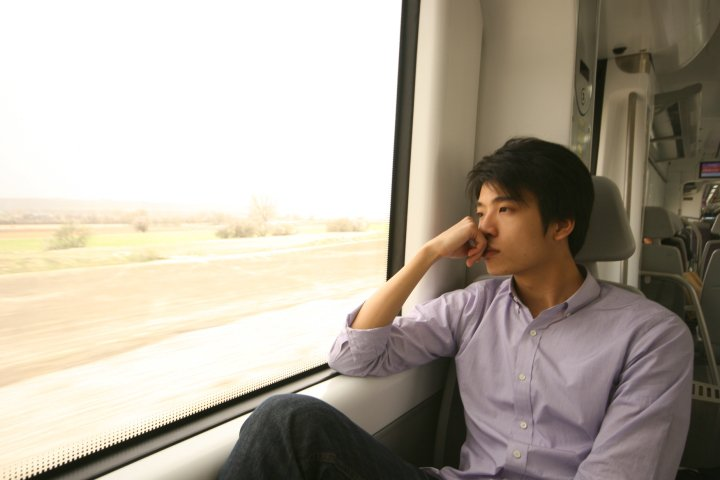
Man thinking on a train journey

Psychologists have concentrated on thinking as an intellectual exertion aimed at finding an answer to a question or the solution of a practical problem. Cognitive psychology is a branch of psychology that investigates internal mental processes such as problem solving, memory, and language; all of which are used in thinking. The school of thought arising from this approach is known as cognitivism, which is interested in how people mentally represent information processing. It had its foundations in the Gestalt psychology of Max Wertheimer, Wolfgang Köhler, and Kurt Koffka, and in the work of Jean Piaget, who provided a theory of stages/phases that describes children's cognitive development.

Cognitive psychologists use psychophysical and experimental approaches to understand, diagnose, and solve problems, concerning themselves with the mental processes which mediate between stimulus and response. They study various aspects of thinking, including the psychology of reasoning, and how people make decisions and choices, solve problems, as well as engage in creative discovery and imaginative thought. Cognitive theory contends that solutions to problems either take the form of algorithms: rules that are not necessarily understood but promise a solution, or of heuristics: rules that are understood but that do not always guarantee solutions. Cognitive science differs from cognitive psychology in that algorithms that are intended to simulate human behavior are implemented or implementable on a computer. In other instances, solutions may be found through insight, a sudden awareness of relationships.

In developmental psychology, Jean Piaget was a pioneer in the study of the development of thought from birth to maturity. In his theory of cognitive development, thought is based on actions on the environment. That is, Piaget suggests that the environment is understood through assimilations of objects in the available schemes of action and these accommodate to the objects to the extent that the available schemes fall short of the demands. As a result of this interplay between assimilation and accommodation, thought develops through a sequence of stages that differ qualitatively from each other in mode of representation and complexity of inference and understanding. That is, thought evolves from being based on perceptions and actions at the sensorimotor stage in the first two years of life to internal representations in early childhood. Subsequently, representations are gradually organized into logical structures which first operate on the concrete properties of the reality, in the stage of concrete operations, and then operate on abstract principles that organize concrete properties, in the stage of formal operations. In recent years, the Piagetian conception of thought was integrated with information processing conceptions. Thus, thought is considered as the result of mechanisms that are responsible for the representation and processing of information. In this conception, speed of processing, cognitive control, and working memory are the main functions underlying thought. In the neo-Piagetian theories of cognitive development, the development of thought is considered to come from increasing speed of processing, enhanced cognitive control, and increasing working memory.

Positive psychology emphasizes the positive aspects of human psychology as equally important as the focus on mood disorders and other negative symptoms. In Character Strengths and Virtues, Peterson and Seligman list a series of positive characteristics. One person is not expected to have every strength, nor are they meant to fully capsulate that characteristic entirely. The list encourages positive thought that builds on a person's strengths, rather than how to "fix" their "symptoms".

=== Psychoanalysis ===
The "id", "ego" and "super-ego" are the three parts of the "psychic apparatus" defined in Sigmund Freud's structural model of the psyche; they are the three theoretical constructs in terms of whose activity and interaction mental life is described. According to this model, the uncoordinated instinctual trends are encompassed by the "id", the organized realistic part of the psyche is the "ego", and the critical, moralizing function is the "super-ego".

For psychoanalysis, the unconscious does not include all that is not conscious, rather only what is actively repressed from conscious thought or what the person is averse to knowing consciously. In a sense this view places the self in relationship to their unconscious as an adversary, warring with itself to keep what is unconscious hidden. If a person feels pain, all he can think of is alleviating the pain. Any of his desires, to get rid of pain or enjoy something, command the mind what to do. For Freud, the unconscious was a repository for socially unacceptable ideas, wishes or desires, traumatic memories, and painful emotions put out of mind by the mechanism of psychological repression. However, the contents did not necessarily have to be solely negative. In the psychoanalytic view, the unconscious is a force that can only be recognized by its effects—it expresses itself in the symptom.

The collective unconscious, sometimes known as collective subconscious, is a term of analytical psychology, coined by Carl Jung. It is a part of the unconscious mind, shared by a society, a people, or all humanity, in an interconnected system that is the product of all common experiences and contains such concepts as science, religion, and morality. While Freud did not distinguish between "individual psychology" and "collective psychology", Jung distinguished the collective unconscious from the personal subconscious particular to each human being. The collective unconscious is also known as "a reservoir of the experiences of our species".

In the "Definitions" chapter of Jung's seminal work Psychological Types, under the definition of "collective" Jung references representations collectives, a term coined by Lucien Lévy-Bruhl in his 1910 book How Natives Think. Jung says this is what he describes as the collective unconscious. Freud, on the other hand, did not accept the idea of a collective unconscious.

== Related concepts and theories ==
=== Laws of thought ===
Traditionally, the term "laws of thought" refers to three fundamental laws of logic: the law of contradiction, the law of excluded middle, and the principle of identity. These laws by themselves are not sufficient as axioms of logic but they can be seen as important precursors to the modern axiomatization of logic. The law of contradiction states that for any proposition, it is impossible that both it and its negation are true: $\lnot (p \land \lnot p)$. According to the law of excluded middle, for any proposition, either it or its opposite is true: $p \lor \lnot p$. The principle of identity asserts that any object is identical to itself: $\forall x (x = x)$. There are different conceptions of how the laws of thought are to be understood. The interpretations most relevant to thinking are to understand them as prescriptive laws of how one should think or as formal laws of propositions that are true only because of their form and independent of their content or context. Metaphysical interpretations, on the other hand, see them as expressing the nature of "being as such".

While there is a very wide acceptance of these three laws among logicians, they are not universally accepted. Aristotle, for example, held that there are some cases in which the law of excluded middle is false. This concerns primarily uncertain future events. On his view, it is currently "not ... either true or false that there will be a naval battle tomorrow". Modern intuitionist logic also rejects the law of excluded middle. This rejection is based on the idea that mathematical truth depends on verification through a proof. The law fails for cases where no such proof is possible, which exist in every sufficiently strong formal system, according to Gödel's incompleteness theorems. Dialetheists, on the other hand, reject the law of contradiction by holding that some propositions are both true and false. One motivation of this position is to avoid certain paradoxes in classical logic and set theory, like the liar's paradox and Russell's paradox. One of its problems is to find a formulation that circumvents the principle of explosion, i.e. that anything follows from a contradiction.

Some formulations of the laws of thought include a fourth law: the principle of sufficient reason. It states that everything has a sufficient reason, ground, or cause. It is closely connected to the idea that everything is intelligible or can be explained in reference to its sufficient reason. According to this idea, there should always be a full explanation, at least in principle, to questions like why the sky is blue or why World War II happened. One problem for including this principle among the laws of thought is that it is a metaphysical principle, unlike the other three laws, which pertain primarily to logic.

=== Counterfactual thinking ===
Counterfactual thinking involves mental representations of non-actual situations and events, i.e. of what is "contrary to the facts". It is usually conditional: it aims at assessing what would be the case if a certain condition had obtained. In this sense, it tries to answer "What if"-questions. For example, thinking after an accident that one would be dead if one had not used the seatbelt is a form of counterfactual thinking: it assumes, contrary to the facts, that one had not used the seatbelt and tries to assess the result of this state of affairs. In this sense, counterfactual thinking is normally counterfactual only to a small degree since just a few facts are changed, like concerning the seatbelt, while most other facts are kept in place, like that one was driving, one's gender, the laws of physics, etc. When understood in the widest sense, there are forms of counterfactual thinking that do not involve anything contrary to the facts at all. This is the case, for example, when one tries to anticipate what might happen in the future if an uncertain event occurs and this event actually occurs later and brings with it the anticipated consequences. In this wider sense, the term "subjunctive conditional" is sometimes used instead of "counterfactual conditional". But the paradigmatic cases of counterfactual thinking involve alternatives to past events.

Counterfactual thinking plays an important role since we evaluate the world around us not only by what actually happened but also by what could have happened. Humans have a greater tendency to engage in counterfactual thinking after something bad happened because of some kind of action the agent performed. In this sense, many regrets are associated with counterfactual thinking in which the agent contemplates how a better outcome could have been obtained if only they had acted differently. These cases are known as upward counterfactuals, in contrast to downward counterfactuals, in which the counterfactual scenario is worse than actuality. Upward counterfactual thinking is usually experienced as unpleasant, since it presents the actual circumstances in a bad light. This contrasts with the positive emotions associated with downward counterfactual thinking. But both forms are important since it is possible to learn from them and to adjust one's behavior accordingly to get better results in the future.

=== Thought experiments ===
Thought experiments involve thinking about imaginary situations, often with the aim of investigating the possible consequences of a change to the actual sequence of events. It is a controversial issue to what extent thought experiments should be understood as actual experiments. They are experiments in the sense that a certain situation is set up and one tries to learn from this situation by understanding what follows from it. They differ from regular experiments in that imagination is used to set up the situation and counterfactual reasoning is employed to evaluate what follows from it, instead of setting it up physically and observing the consequences through perception. Counterfactual thinking, therefore, plays a central role in thought experiments.

The Chinese room argument is a famous thought experiment proposed by John Searle. It involves a person sitting inside a closed-off room, tasked with responding to messages written in Chinese. This person does not know Chinese but has a giant rule book that specifies exactly how to reply to any possible message, similar to how a computer would react to messages. The core idea of this thought experiment is that neither the person nor the computer understands Chinese. This way, Searle aims to show that computers lack a mind capable of deeper forms of understanding despite acting intelligently.

Thought experiments are employed for various purposes, for example, for entertainment, education, or as arguments for or against theories. Most discussions focus on their use as arguments. This use is found in fields like philosophy, the natural sciences, and history. It is controversial since there is a lot of disagreement concerning the epistemic status of thought experiments, i.e. how reliable they are as evidence supporting or refuting a theory. Central to the rejection of this usage is the fact that they pretend to be a source of knowledge without the need to leave one's armchair in search of any new empirical data. Defenders of thought experiments usually contend that the intuitions underlying and guiding the thought experiments are, at least in some cases, reliable. But thought experiments can also fail if they are not properly supported by intuitions or if they go beyond what the intuitions support. In the latter sense, sometimes counter thought experiments are proposed that modify the original scenario in slight ways in order to show that initial intuitions cannot survive this change. Various taxonomies of thought experiments have been suggested. They can be distinguished, for example, by whether they are successful or not, by the discipline that uses them, by their role in a theory, or by whether they accept or modify the actual laws of physics.

=== Critical thinking ===
Critical thinking is a form of thinking that is reasonable, reflective, and focused on determining what to believe or how to act. It holds itself to various standards, like clarity and rationality. In this sense, it involves not just cognitive processes trying to solve the issue at hand but at the same time meta-cognitive processes ensuring that it lives up to its own standards. This includes assessing both that the reasoning itself is sound and that the evidence it rests on is reliable. This means that logic plays an important role in critical thinking. It concerns not just formal logic, but also informal logic, specifically to avoid various informal fallacies due to vague or ambiguous expressions in natural language. No generally accepted standard definition of "critical thinking" exists but there is significant overlap between the proposed definitions in their characterization of critical thinking as careful and goal-directed. According to some versions, only the thinker's own observations and experiments are accepted as evidence in critical thinking. Some restrict it to the formation of judgments but exclude action as its goal.

A concrete everyday example of critical thinking, due to John Dewey, involves observing foam bubbles moving in a direction that is contrary to one's initial expectations. The critical thinker tries to come up with various possible explanations of this behavior and then slightly modifies the original situation in order to determine which one is the right explanation. But not all forms of cognitively valuable processes involve critical thinking. Arriving at the correct solution to a problem by blindly following the steps of an algorithm does not qualify as critical thinking. The same is true if the solution is presented to the thinker in a sudden flash of insight and accepted straight away.

Critical thinking plays an important role in education: fostering the student's ability to think critically is often seen as an important educational goal. In this sense, it is important to convey not just a set of true beliefs to the student but also the ability to draw one's own conclusions and to question pre-existing beliefs. The abilities and dispositions learned this way may profit not just the individual but also society at large. Critics of the emphasis on critical thinking in education have argued that there is no universal form of correct thinking. Instead, they contend that different subject matters rely on different standards and education should focus on imparting these subject-specific skills instead of trying to teach universal methods of thinking. Other objections are based on the idea that critical thinking and the attitude underlying it involve various unjustified biases, like egocentrism, distanced objectivity, indifference, and an overemphasis of the theoretical in contrast to the practical.

=== Positive thinking ===
Positive thinking is an important topic in positive psychology. It involves focusing one's attention on the positive aspects of one's situation and thereby withdrawing one's attention from its negative sides. This is usually seen as a global outlook that applies especially to thinking but includes other mental processes, like feeling, as well. In this sense, it is closely related to optimism. It includes expecting positive things to happen in the future. This positive outlook makes it more likely for people to seek to attain new goals. It also increases the probability of continuing to strive towards pre-existing goals that seem difficult to reach instead of just giving up.

The effects of positive thinking are not yet thoroughly researched, but some studies suggest that there is a correlation between positive thinking and well-being. For example, students and pregnant women with a positive outlook tend to be better at dealing with stressful situations. This is sometimes explained by pointing out that stress is not inherent in stressful situations but depends on the agent's interpretation of the situation. Reduced stress may therefore be found in positive thinkers because they tend to see such situations in a more positive light. But the effects also include the practical domain in that positive thinkers tend to employ healthier coping strategies when faced with difficult situations. This effects, for example, the time needed to fully recover from surgeries and the tendency to resume physical exercise afterward.

But it has been argued that whether positive thinking actually leads to positive outcomes depends on various other factors. Without these factors, it may lead to negative results. For example, the tendency of optimists to keep striving in difficult situations can backfire if the course of events is outside the agent's control. Another danger associated with positive thinking is that it may remain only on the level of unrealistic fantasies and thereby fail to make a positive practical contribution to the agent's life. Pessimism, on the other hand, may have positive effects since it can mitigate disappointments by anticipating failures.

Positive thinking is a recurrent topic in the self-help literature. Here, often the claim is made that one can significantly improve one's life by trying to think positively, even if this means fostering beliefs that are contrary to evidence. Such claims and the effectiveness of the suggested methods are controversial and have been criticized due to their lack of scientific evidence. In the New Thought movement, positive thinking figures in the law of attraction, the pseudoscientific claim that positive thoughts can directly influence the external world by attracting positive outcomes.

== See also ==
- Animal cognition
- Freethought – Position that beliefs should be formed only on the basis of logic, reason, and empiricism
- Outline of human intelligence – Topic tree presenting the traits, capacities, models, and research fields of human intelligence, and more
- Outline of thought – Topic tree that identifies many types of thoughts, types of thinking, aspects of thought, related fields, and more
- Rethinking – To review a conclusion previously made
