= Susan Schneider =

American philosopher and artificial intelligence expert

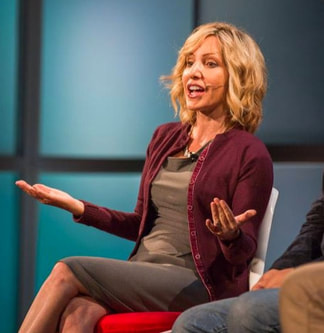
- Schneider on AI panel, 2019
- Occupation: Philosopher

Academic background
- Education: University of California, Berkeley; Rutgers University
- Doctoral advisor: Jerry Fodor
- Website: schneiderwebsite.com

External videos
- Artificial You: AI and The Future Of Your Mind, Susan Schneider, Talks at Google, Nov 7, 2019
- Can A Robot Feel?, Susan Schneider, TEDxCambridge, June 22, 2016
- Transcending the Brain? AI, Radical Brain Enhancement and the Nature of Consciousness, Susan Schneider, Harvard, January 3, 2019
- AI and Artificially Enhanced Brains, Susan Schneider, Royal Institution, June 18, 2020

Susan Schneider is an American philosopher and artificial intelligence expert. She is the founding director of the Center for the Future of AI, Mind, & Society at Florida Atlantic University where she also holds the William F. Dietrich Distinguished Professorship. She is also Co-Principal Investigator at the Machine Perception and Cognitive Robotics Laboratory (MPCR Lab) in the Center for Complex Systems and Brain Sciences. Schneider has also held the Baruch S. Blumberg NASA/Library of Congress Chair in Astrobiology, Exploration, and Scientific Innovation at NASA and the Distinguished Scholar Chair at the Library of Congress.

== Education ==
Schneider graduated from University of California, Berkeley in 1993 with a B.A. (honors) in Economics. She then went to Rutgers University where she worked with Jerry Fodor, graduating with a Ph.D. in Philosophy in 2003.

== Career ==
Schneider was an assistant professor of philosophy at the University of Pennsylvania and an associate professor of philosophy and cognitive science at the University of Connecticut. She was the founding director of the group for AI, Mind and Society ("AIMS"). In addition she has done research at the Australian National University, the Institute for Advanced Study in Princeton, New Jersey and at the Yale Interdisciplinary Center for Bioethics at Yale University

At the Library of Congress in Washington, D.C. she has held the Distinguished Scholar chair and the Baruch S. Blumburg NASA Chair in Astrobiology, Exploration and Technological innovation. In 2020, Schneider accepted the position of William F. Dietrich Professor of Philosophy at Florida Atlantic University (FAU), jointly appointed to the FAU Brain Institute.

=== Philosophy of mind ===
Schneider writes about the philosophical nature of the mind and self, drawing on and addressing issues from philosophy of mind, cognitive science, artificial intelligence, ethics, metaphysics, and astrobiology. Topics include the nature of life, the nature of persons, what minds have in common with programs, radical brain enhancement, superintelligence, panpsychism, and emergent spacetime.

=== Artificial Intelligence ===
In her book Artificial You: AI and the Future of Your Mind, Schneider discusses different theories of artificial intelligence (AI) and consciousness, and speculates about the ethical, philosophical, and scientific implications of AI for humanity. She argues that AI will inevitably change our understanding of intelligence, and may also change us in ways that we do not anticipate, intend, or desire. She advocates for a cautious and thoughtful approach to transhumanism. She emphasizes that people must make careful choices to ensure that sentient beings – whether human or android – flourish. Using AI technology to reshape the human brain or to build machine minds, will mean experimenting with "tools" that we do not understand how to use: the mind, the self, and consciousness. Schneider argues that failing to understand fundamental philosophical issues will jeopardize the beneficial use of AI and brain enhancement technology, and may lead to the suffering or death of conscious beings. To flourish, humans must address the philosophical issues underlying the AI algorithms.

In her work on the mind-body problem, she argues against physicalism, maintaining a monistic position and offering, in a series of papers, several novel anti-physicalist arguments.

In the domain of astrobiology, Schneider contends that the most intelligent alien beings we encounter will be "postbiological in nature", being forms of artificial intelligence, that they would be superintelligent, and that we can predict what the shape of some of these superintelligences would be like. Her reason for the claim that the most intelligent aliens will be "postbiological" is called the "short window observation." The short-window supposition holds that by the time any society learns to transmit radio signals, they're likely just a few hundred years from upgrading their own biology.

In an earlier technical book on the computational nature of the brain with MIT Press, The Language of Thought: a New Philosophical Direction (2011), Schneider examines the viability of different computational theories of thinking. Expanding on the work of Jerry Fodor, with whom she had studied, she suggests revisions to the symbol processing approach known as the "language of thought hypothesis" (LOTH) or "language of thought" (LOT). Drawing on both computational neuroscience and cognitive psychology, Scheider argues that the brain may be a hybrid computational system. She defends a view in which mental symbols are the basic vocabulary items composing the language of thought. She then uses this conception of symbols, together with certain work on the nature of meaning, to construct a theory of the nature of concepts. The basic theory of concepts is intended to be ecumenical, having a version that applies in the case of connectionism, as well as versions that apply to both the prototype theory and definitions view of concepts.

Testing AI:

To determine whether something is conscious we must perform dedicated tests in order to come to a conclusion. The Turing test was developed in an attempt to solve the puzzle of testing thinking, not consciousness. This test was developed far before the first artificial intelligence were made and does not answer the true question of consciousness. The idea behind the Turing test was that if it could have a conversation, then it could think. However this is far too restrictive. Much like the "seagull test" just because it looks like a seagull doesn't mean it can fly. Due to these faults, a new test had to be created. When it comes to machine minds, Schneider has developed her own personal opinions on machine consciousness. She believed that we should test computer consciousness with a variety of different tests. The two main tests Schneider shares her opinions about are the ACT test and her chip test. These test aim to defeat the faults that plague the Turing test.

Chip Test:

The Chip test, unlike the Turing test Focuses on the parts inside the machine and not just its behaviors. She thinks that if a machine has the same parts that could support a human consciousness, we should consider that it might also have a consciousness and be conscious. This means that if the machine could contain parts that had the capability to support consciousness, then it would be possible to be conscious. The issue with this test is that if we replaced someone's brain with a silicon chip, then we ask them if they are conscious, there is nothing stopping the chip from emitting a sound that says "yes, I am conscious". They could act exactly as they did before, simply without consciousness. Susan has also put forward the idea of the "hybrid chip test," integrating biological organoids and LLMs to directly test subjective experience.

ACT test:

The ACT test is responsible for determining consciousness based on verbal behavior, more specifically; verbal behavior concerning the metaphysics of consciousness. The machine will be tested on its ability to have philosophical ideas and thoughts, whether it thinks of the afterlife and whether we have a soul or not, etc. If the machine could have these profound thoughts without being taught to do so, then it would be conscious. If a machine is not truly conscious, then it would perform these tests very poorly. However this test has its faults as well. The test relies on the idea that the machine would not have been fed any information of any kind. The issue lies, however, not in the computer but in humans, since we have been fed information from the moment we were born. Our philosophy has been constructed by the things and ideas around us. So while we may think philosophically about what happens when we die, the computer may be thinking of something completely different. So if a machine was not fed any information at all, or even info different form ours, then we could not compare them to us.

== Public philosophy ==
Schneider is active as a public philosopher, who believes that individuals, not companies, need to be considering and deciding the philosophical issues that will affect them personally, socially, and culturally as a result of artificial intelligence. She writes opinion pieces for venues such as the New York Times, The Financial Times and Scientific American. Schneider had also contributed articles to Nautilus magazine.

Her work has been mentioned by numerous publications including The New York Times, Wired Magazine, Smithsonian, Discover Magazine, Science Magazine, Slate, Motherboard, Big Think, Inverse, and Nautilus.

Schneider has been featured on television shows on BBC World News, The History Channel, Fox News, PBS, and the National Geographic Channel, and appears in the feature film, Supersapiens: the Rise of the Mind by Markus Mooslechner.

== Books ==
- (with Max Velmans, eds.), The Blackwell Companion to Consciousness, Oxford: Blackwell Publishers, 2006. ISBN 9780470674079
- Science Fiction and Philosophy, Oxford: Wiley-Blackwell, 2009. ISBN 9781118922613
- The Language of Thought: a New Philosophical Direction, MIT Press, 2011. ISBN 9780262527453
- Artificial You: AI and the Future of Your Mind, Princeton University Press, 2019. ISBN 9780691180144
- Amy Mind The Philosophy of Mind, Machine Minds (106-107)
