= Sentient computer =

Sentient computer, may refer to:

- Artificial general intelligence, a hypothetical machine that exhibits behavior at least as skillful and flexible as humans do
- Computational theory of mind, the view that human minds are (or can be usefully modeled as) computer programs
