= Fiona Cowie =

American philosopher

Fiona Cowie

Fiona Cowie (August 21, 1963-December 9, 2018) was a professor of philosophy at California Institute of Technology. She specialized in the philosophy of mind, of biology, and of linguistics.

== Life ==
Fiona Cowie was born in Sydney, Australia in 1963. She gained her MA at Princeton University in 1991, and a PhD in philosophy, also at Princeton, in 1994. She joined the philosophy faculty at California Institute of Technology in 1992. She became a full professor there in 2010. She specialized in the philosophy of mind, of biology, and of linguistics.

== Awards and distinctions ==
Cowie's book What's Within? Nativism Reconsidered won the 1999 Gustave O. Arlt Award in the Humanities. The book argued that multiple features of the mind are learnt, not innate, opposing Jerry Fodor's view.

== Works ==
=== Books ===
- Cowie, Fiona (1999). What's Within?. New York: Oxford University Press. ISBN 978-0-19-512384-5.

=== Articles ===
- The logical problem of language acquisition, 1997
- Mad dog nativism, 1998
- On Cussing in Church: In Defence of What's Within?, 2001
- Innateness and language, 2008
- Us, them, and it: Modules, genes, environments and evolution, 2008
- Why isn't Stich an eliminativist?, 2009

=== Reviews ===
- Ask Darwin's Grandma (review of Mean Genes: From Sex to Money to Food: Taming Our Primal Instincts, 2000)
- Of Theft and Honest Toil (review of Mind in Everyday Life and Cognitive Science, 2001)
