= Context principle =

Form of semantic holism in the philosophy of language

In the philosophy of language, the context principle is a form of semantic holism holding that a philosopher should "never ... ask for the meaning of a word in isolation, but only in the context of a proposition" (Frege [1884/1980] x).

== Analysis ==
The context principle is one of Gottlob Frege's "three fundamental principles" for philosophical analysis, first discussed in his Introduction to The Foundations of Arithmetic (Grundlagen der Arithmetik, 1884). Frege argued that many philosophical errors, especially those related to psychologism in the philosophy of logic and philosophy of mathematics, could be avoided by adhering carefully to the context principle. The view of meaning expressed by the context principle is sometimes called semantic contextualism.

This view need not be contrasted with the view that the meanings of words or expressions can (or must) be determined prior to, and independently of, the meanings of the propositions in which they occur, which is often referred to as the principle of compositionality.

The context principle also figures prominently in the work of other analytic philosophers, such as Bertrand Russell and Ludwig Wittgenstein, who were greatly influenced by Frege's work.

== Formulations of the context principle ==
Gottlob Frege, Introduction to The Foundations of Arithmetic (1884/1980):

In the enquiry that follows, I have kept to three fundamental principles:

always to separate sharply the psychological from the logical, the subjective from the objective;
never to ask for the meaning of a word in isolation, but only in the context of a proposition
never to lose sight of the distinction between concept and object.

Ludwig Wittgenstein, Tractatus Logico-Philosophicus (1921/1922):

3.3 Only the proposition has sense; only in the context of a proposition has a name meaning. ...
3.314 An expression has meaning only in a proposition. Every variable can be conceived as a propositional variable.
(Including the variable name.)

== See also ==
- Principle of compositionality
- Semantic holism
