= Computational theory of mind =

Family of views in the philosophy of mind

In philosophy of mind, the computational theory of mind (CTM), also known as computationalism, is a family of views that hold that the human mind is an information processing system and that cognition and consciousness together are a form of computation. It is closely related to functionalism, a broader theory that defines mental states by what they do rather than what they are made of.

== History ==
Warren McCulloch and Walter Pitts (1943) were the first to suggest that neural activity is computational. They argued that neural computations explain cognition. A version of the theory was put forward by Peter Putnam and Robert W. Fuller in 1964. The theory was proposed in its modern form by Hilary Putnam in 1960 and 1961, aided by his then PhD student, philosopher and cognitive scientist Jerry Fodor, who continued the research as a post-doc in the 1960s, 1970s, and 1980s. It was later criticized by Putnam himself, John Searle, and others.

== Classical computational theory of mind ==
The CTM holds that the human mind is a computational system that is realized (i.e., physically implemented) by neural activity in the brain. The theory can be elaborated in many ways and varies largely based on how the term computation is understood.

In classical computational theory of mind (CCTM), computation is modeled in terms of Turing machines which manipulate symbols according to a rule, in combination with the internal state of the machine. A Turing machine is an abstract machine with unlimited time and storage. CCTM does not pretend that the mind looks like a Turing machine, but instead uses Turing machines as a formalism. Alan Turing argued that any symbolic algorithm executed by a human brain can in theory be replicated on a Turing machine.

The critical aspect of such a computational model is that it allows to abstract away from particular physical details of the machine that is implementing the computation. For example, the appropriate computation could be implemented either by silicon chips or biological neural networks, so long as there is a series of outputs based on manipulations of inputs and internal states, performed according to a rule.

Computational theories of mind are often said to require mental representation because 'input' into a computation comes in the form of symbols or representations of other objects. A computer cannot compute an actual object but must interpret and represent the object in some form and then compute the representation. Unlike CTM, the representational theory of mind shifts the focus to the symbols being manipulated. This approach better accounts for systematicity and productivity. In Fodor's view, the mind is a computational system that processes the language of thought.

== Connectionist computationalism ==
Connectionist computationalism models the mind as a neural network. Steven Pinker and Alan Prince distinguish two types of connectionists: eliminative and implementationist. Eliminative connectionists generally reject classical CTMs and the idea of a structured, symbolic mind, whereas implementationists view neural networks and Turing machines as two potentially complementary levels of analysis. It is indeed possible in theory to implement a neural network in a Turing machine, or a Turing machine in a neural network.

== "Computer metaphor" ==
The CTM is not the same as the computer metaphor, comparing the mind to a modern-day digital computer. While the computer metaphor draws an analogy between the mind as software and the brain as hardware, CTM is the claim that the mind is literally a computational system. "Computational system" is not intended to mean a modern-day electronic computer. The CTM is also different from the computational theory of cognition (CTC), which merely states that neural computations explain cognition, without regard to whether they explain phenomenal consciousness.

== Pancomputationalism ==
The CTM raises a question that remains a subject of debate: what does it take for a physical system (such as a mind, or an artificial computer) to perform computations? A very straightforward account is based on a simple mapping between abstract mathematical computations and physical systems: a system performs computation C if and only if there is a mapping between a sequence of states individuated by C and a sequence of states individuated by a physical description of the system.

Putnam (1988) and Searle (1992) argue that this simple mapping account (SMA) trivializes the empirical import of computational descriptions. As Putnam put it, "everything is a Probabilistic Automaton under some Description". Even rocks, walls, and buckets of water—contrary to appearances—are computing systems. Gualtiero Piccinini identifies different versions of pancomputationalism. Searle wrote:

the wall behind my back is right now implementing the WordStar program, because there is some pattern of molecule movements that is isomorphic with the formal structure of WordStar. But if the wall is implementing WordStar, if it is a big enough wall it is implementing any program, including any program implemented in the brain.

In response to the trivialization criticism, and to restrict SMA, philosophers of mind have offered different accounts of computational systems. These typically include causal account, semantic account, syntactic account, and mechanistic account. Instead of a semantic restriction, the syntactic account imposes a syntactic restriction. The mechanistic account was first introduced by Gualtiero Piccinini in 2007.

== Criticism ==
A range of arguments have been proposed against physicalist conceptions used in computational theories of mind.

An early, though indirect, criticism of the computational theory of mind comes from philosopher John Searle. In his thought experiment known as the Chinese room, Searle attempts to refute the claims that artificially intelligent agents can be said to have intentionality and understanding and that these systems, because they can be said to be minds themselves, are sufficient for the study of the human mind. Searle asks us to imagine that there is a man in a room with no way of communicating with anyone or anything outside of the room except for a piece of paper with symbols written on it that is passed under the door. With the paper, the man is to use a series of provided rule books to return paper containing different symbols. Unknown to the man in the room, these symbols are of a Chinese language, and this process generates a conversation that a Chinese speaker outside of the room can actually understand. Searle contends that the man in the room does not understand the Chinese conversation. This was originally written as a repudiation of the idea that computers work like minds.

Objections like Searle's might be called insufficiency objections. They claim that computational theories of mind fail because computation is insufficient to account for some capacity of the mind. Arguments from qualia, such as Frank Jackson's knowledge argument, can be understood as objections to computational theories of mind in this way—though they take aim at physicalist conceptions of the mind in general, and not computational theories specifically.

Objections have also been put forth that are directly tailored for computational theories of mind.

Jerry Fodor himself argues that the mind is still a very long way from having been explained by the computational theory of mind. The main reason for this shortcoming is that most cognition is abductive and global, hence sensitive to all possibly relevant background beliefs to (dis)confirm a belief. This creates, among other problems, the frame problem for the computational theory, because the relevance of a belief is not one of its local, syntactic properties but context-dependent.

Putnam himself (see in particular Representation and Reality and the first part of Renewing Philosophy) became a prominent critic of computationalism for a variety of reasons, including ones related to Searle's Chinese room arguments, questions of world-word reference relations, and thoughts about the mind-body problem. Regarding functionalism in particular, Putnam has claimed along lines similar to, but more general than Searle's arguments, that the question of whether the human mind can implement computational states is not relevant to the question of the nature of mind, because "every ordinary open system realizes every abstract finite automaton." Computationalists have responded by aiming to develop criteria describing what exactly counts as an implementation.

Roger Penrose has proposed the idea that the human mind does not use a knowably sound calculation procedure to understand and discover mathematical intricacies. This would mean that a normal Turing complete computer would not be able to ascertain certain mathematical truths that human minds can. The application of Gödel's theorem by Penrose to demonstrate it, however, was widely criticized, and is considered erroneous.

== Notable theorists ==
- Daniel Dennett proposed the multiple drafts model, in which consciousness seems linear but is actually blurry, distributed over space and time in the brain. Consciousness is the computation, there is no extra step in which you become conscious of the computation.
- Jerry Fodor argues that mental states, such as beliefs and desires, are relations between individuals and mental representations. He maintains that these representations can only be correctly explained in terms of a language of thought (LOT) in the mind. Further, this language of thought itself is codified in the brain, not just a useful explanatory tool. Fodor adheres to a species of functionalism, maintaining that thinking and other mental processes consist primarily of computations operating on the syntax of the representations that make up the language of thought. In later work (Concepts and The Elm and the Expert), Fodor has refined and even questioned some of his original computationalist views, and adopted LOT2, a highly modified version of LOT.
- David Marr proposed that cognitive processes have three levels of description: the computational level, which describes what operations the system performs and why it performs them; the algorithmic level, which presents the algorithm used for computing it; and the implementational level, which describes the physical implementation of the algorithm postulated at the algorithmic level.
- Ulric Neisser popularized the term cognitive psychology in his book with that title published in 1967. Neisser characterizes people as dynamic information-processing systems whose mental operations might be described in computational terms.
- Steven Pinker argued in his 1997 book How the Mind Works that "thinking and feeling consist of information-processing in the brain" and sought to explain the brain from an evolutionary psychology perspective. He wrote that similarly to organs, human mental faculties exist because they serve a role for survival or reproduction.
- Hilary Putnam proposed functionalism to describe consciousness, asserting that it is the computation that equates to consciousness, regardless of whether the computation is operating in a brain or in a computer.

== See also ==
- Artificial consciousness – Hypothetical consciousness in artificial systems
- Cognitivism (psychology) – Theoretical framework for understanding the mind
- Constructivist epistemology – Hypothesis that scientific knowledge is constructed as models of reality
- Enchanted loom – Metaphor for the human brain
- Simulated reality – Concept of a false version of reality
- Stimulus–response model – Conceptual framework in psychology
- Stochastic parrot – Term used in machine learning

=== Alternative theories ===
- Adaptive systems – Systems that can adapt to the environment
- Associationism – Psychological concept
- Connectionism – Cognitive science approach
- Enactivism – Philosophical concept
- Memory-prediction framework – Theory of brain function
- Neurophenomenology – Research into the problem of consciousness
- Perceptual control theory – Psychological theory
- Situated cognition – Hypothesis that knowing is inseparable from doing

== Bibliography ==
- Block, Ned, ed. (1983). Readings in Philosophy of Psychology. Vol. 1. Cambridge, Massachusetts: Harvard University Press. ISBN 0-674-74876-X. OCLC 810753995.
- Chalmers, David (2011). "A Computational Foundation for the Study of Cognition". Journal of Cognitive Science. 12 (4): 323–357.
- Crane, Tim (2016). The Mechanical Mind: A Philosophical Introduction to Minds, Machines, and Mental Representation (3nd ed.). London and New York: Routledge. ISBN 978-1-138-85832-9. OCLC 964575493.
- Fodor, Jerry (1975). The Language of Thought. Cambridge, Massachusetts: Harvard University Press. ISBN 0-674-51030-5. OCLC 15149586.
- Fodor, Jerry (1995). The Elm and the Expert: Mentalese and Its Semantics (eBook ed.). Cambridge, Massachusetts: The MIT Press. doi:10.7551/mitpress/2693.001.0001. ISBN 978-0-262-27288-9. OCLC 9470770683.
- Fodor, Jerry (1998). Concepts: Where Cognitive Science Went Wrong. Oxford Cognitive Science Series. Oxford and New York: Clarendon Press of the Oxford University Press. ISBN 978-0-19-823637-5. OCLC 38079317.
- Fodor, Jerry (2000). The Mind Doesn't Work That Way: The Scope and Limits of Computational Psychology. Cambridge, MA and London: The MIT Press. ISBN 978-0-262-06212-1. OCLC 43109956.
- Fodor, Jerry (2010). LOT 2: The Language of Thought Revisited. Oxford and New York: Oxford University Press. ISBN 978-0-19-954877-4. OCLC 470698989.
- Harnad, Stevan (1994). "Computation Is Just Interpretable Symbol Manipulation: Cognition Isn't". Minds and Machines. 4 (4): 379–390. doi:10.1007/bf00974165. S2CID 230344.
- Marr, David (2010) [1981]. Vision: A Computational Investigation into the Human Representation and Processing of Visual Information. Cambridge, MA and London: The MIT Press. ISBN 978-0-262-51462-0. OCLC 472791457.
- Piccinini, Gualtiero (2015). Physical Computation: A Mechanistic Account. Oxford: Oxford University Press. ISBN 978-0-19-965885-5. OCLC 920617851.
- Pinker, Steven (1997). How the Mind Works. New York: W. W. Norton. ISBN 978-0-393-04535-2. OCLC 36379708.
- Putnam, Hilary (1995) [1979]. Mathematics, Matter, and Method. Philosophical Papers, Volume 1 (2nd ed.). Cambridge and New York: Cambridge University Press. ISBN 0-521-29550-5. OCLC 258667059.
- Putnam, Hilary (1995). Renewing Philosophy (Reissue ed.). Cambridge, Massachusetts: Harvard University Press. ISBN 978-0-674-76094-3. OCLC 60298037.
- Pylyshyn, Zenon (1984). Computation and Cognition: Toward a Foundation for Cognitive Science. Cambridge, Massachusetts: The MIT Press. ISBN 0-262-16098-6. OCLC 10507591.
- Searle, John (1992). The Rediscovery of the Mind. Cambridge, Massachusetts: The MIT Press. ISBN 0-262-69154-X. OCLC 760581004.
- Zalta, Edward N. (ed.). "The Computational Theory of Mind". Stanford Encyclopedia of Philosophy. ISSN 1095-5054. OCLC 429049174.
