= Jerry Fodor =

American philosopher (1935–2017)

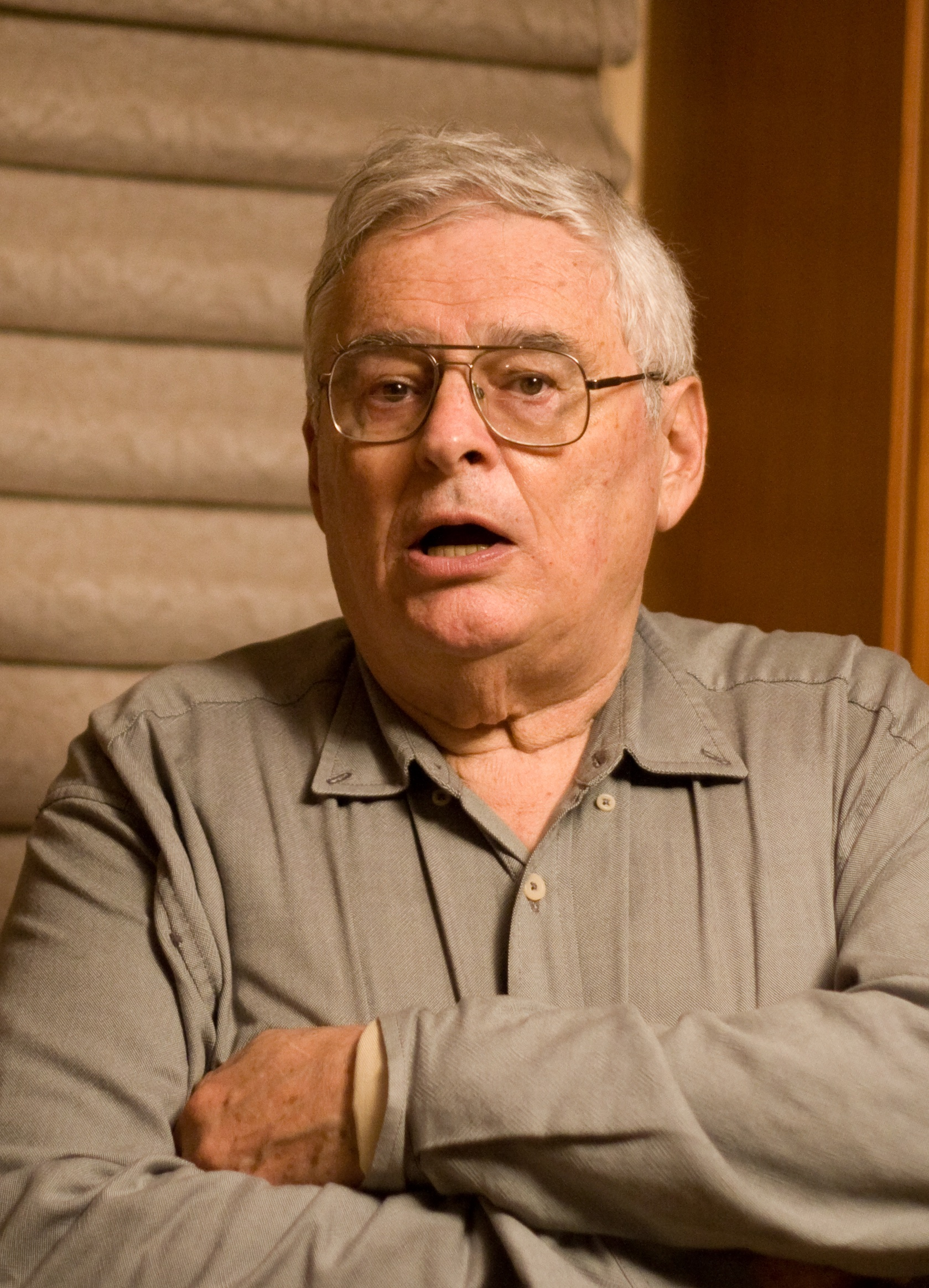
- In 2007
- Born: Jerry Alan Fodor; April 22, 1935; New York City, US
- Died: November 29, 2017 (aged 82); Manhattan, New York City, US
- Awards: Jean Nicod Prize (1993)

Education
- Education: Columbia University (BA); Princeton University (PhD)
- Thesis: The Uses of "Use": A Study in the Philosophy of Language (1960)
- Doctoral advisor: Hilary Putnam
- Other advisor: Sidney Morgenbesser

Philosophical work
- Era: 20th-/21st-century philosophy
- Region: Western philosophy
- School: Analytic
- Institutions: Rutgers University
- Main interests: Philosophy of mind Philosophy of language Cognitive science Rationalism; Cognitivism; Functionalism
- Notable ideas: Modularity of mind Language of thought

Jerry Alan Fodor (/ˈfoʊdər/ FOH-dər; April 22, 1935 – November 29, 2017) was an American philosopher and the author of works in the fields of philosophy of mind and cognitive science. His writings in these fields laid the groundwork for the modularity of mind and the language of thought hypotheses, and he is recognized as having had "an enormous influence on virtually every portion of the philosophy of mind literature since 1960." At the time of his death in 2017, he held the position of State of New Jersey Professor of Philosophy, Emeritus, at Rutgers University, and had taught previously at the City University of New York Graduate Center and MIT.

== Life and career ==
Fodor was born in New York City on April 22, 1935, and was of Jewish descent. He graduated with a B.A. in philosophy, summa cum laude, from Columbia University in 1956. As an undergraduate, he wrote a senior thesis on Søren Kierkegaard and studied with Sidney Morgenbesser and Arthur Danto. He then earned a Ph.D. in philosophy from Princeton University in 1960, under the direction of Hilary Putnam.

From 1959 to 1986 Fodor was on the faculty of the Massachusetts Institute of Technology. From 1986 to 1988 he was a full professor at the City University of New York (CUNY). From 1988, until his retirement in 2016 as emeritus, he was State of New Jersey Professor of philosophy and cognitive science at Rutgers University.

Besides his interest in philosophy, Fodor followed opera and regularly wrote columns for the London Review of Books on that and other topics. Fodor's first marriage was to the applied psychologist Iris Goldstein, with whom he had one son. After their divorce, he married the linguist Janet Dean. Janet and he lived in Manhattan and had a daughter. He died at home on November 29, 2017.

== Philosophical work ==
Fodor argued in his 1975 book The Language of Thought that mental states, such as beliefs and desires, are relations between individuals and mental representations. He maintained that these representations can only be correctly explained in terms of a language of thought (LOT) in the mind. Furthermore, this language of thought itself is an actually existing thing that is codified in the brain and not just a useful explanatory tool. Fodor adhered to a species of functionalism, maintaining that thinking and other mental processes consist primarily of computations operating on the syntax of the representations that make up the language of thought.

For Fodor, significant parts of the mind, such as perceptual and linguistic processes, are structured in terms of modules, or "organs", which he defines by their causal and functional roles. These modules are relatively independent of each other and of the "central processing" part of the mind, which has a more global and less "domain specific" character. Fodor suggests that the character of these modules permits the possibility of causal relations with external objects. This, in turn, makes it possible for mental states to have contents that are about things in the world. The central processing part, on the other hand, takes care of the logical relations between the various contents and inputs and outputs.

Although Fodor originally rejected the idea that mental states must have a causal, externally determined aspect, in his later years he devoted much of his writing and study to the philosophy of language because of this problem of the meaning and reference of mental contents. His contributions in this area include the so-called asymmetric causal theory of reference and his many arguments against semantic holism. Fodor strongly opposed reductive accounts of the mind. He argued that mental states are multiple realizable and that there is a hierarchy of explanatory levels in science such that the generalizations and laws of a higher-level theory of psychology or linguistics, for example, cannot be captured by the low-level explanations of the behavior of neurons and synapses. He also emerged as a prominent critic of what he characterized as the ill-grounded Darwinian theories of natural selection as an explanation of mind.

=== Fodor and the nature of mental states ===
The structure of a mental state, such as that an individual called Mary believes that a man has bitten a dog, as described by Rudolf Carnap, Gottlob Frege, and Fodor. Fodor's scheme says that a person's attitude to something makes use of a mental representation of that thing.

Despite the changes in many of his positions over the years, Fodor's idea that mental states embodying intentionality, propositional attitudes, like beliefs and desires are relational never changed. He attempted to show how mental representations, specifically sentences in the language of thought, are necessary to explain this relational nature of mental states. Fodor considers two alternative hypotheses. The first denies the relational character of mental states, while the second considers mental states as two-place relations. The latter position can be further subdivided into the Carnapian view that such relations are between individuals and sentences of natural languages, and the Fregean view that they are between individuals and the propositions expressed by such sentences. Fodor's own position, instead, is that to properly account for the nature of intentional attitudes, it is necessary to employ a three-place relation between individuals, representations and propositional contents.

Considering mental states as three-place relations in this way, representative realism makes it possible to hold together all of the elements necessary to the solution of this problem. Further, mental representations are not only the objects of beliefs and desires, but are also the domain over which mental processes operate. They can be considered the ideal link between the syntactic notion of mental content and the computational notion of functional architecture. These notions are, according to Fodor, our best explanation of mental processes.

=== Functional architecture of the mind ===
==== Psychological nativism and modularity ====
The Müller-Lyer illusion, that two identical lines look to be of differing lengths, even if the subject knows they are the same length, persuaded Fodor that mental processes are grouped in discrete modules without access to each other.

Following in the path paved by linguist Noam Chomsky, Fodor developed a strong commitment to the idea of psychological nativism. Nativism postulates the innateness of many cognitive functions and concepts. For Fodor, this emerges naturally out of his criticism of behaviourism and associationism. These criticisms led him to formulate his hypothesis of the modularity of the mind.

Fodor noted the evidence from perceptual errors like the Müller-Lyer illusion that processes such as visually estimating the length of a line are not interfered with by the knowledge that the two lines are actually the same length. He took this to mean that the visual processes were in a separate module from knowledge.

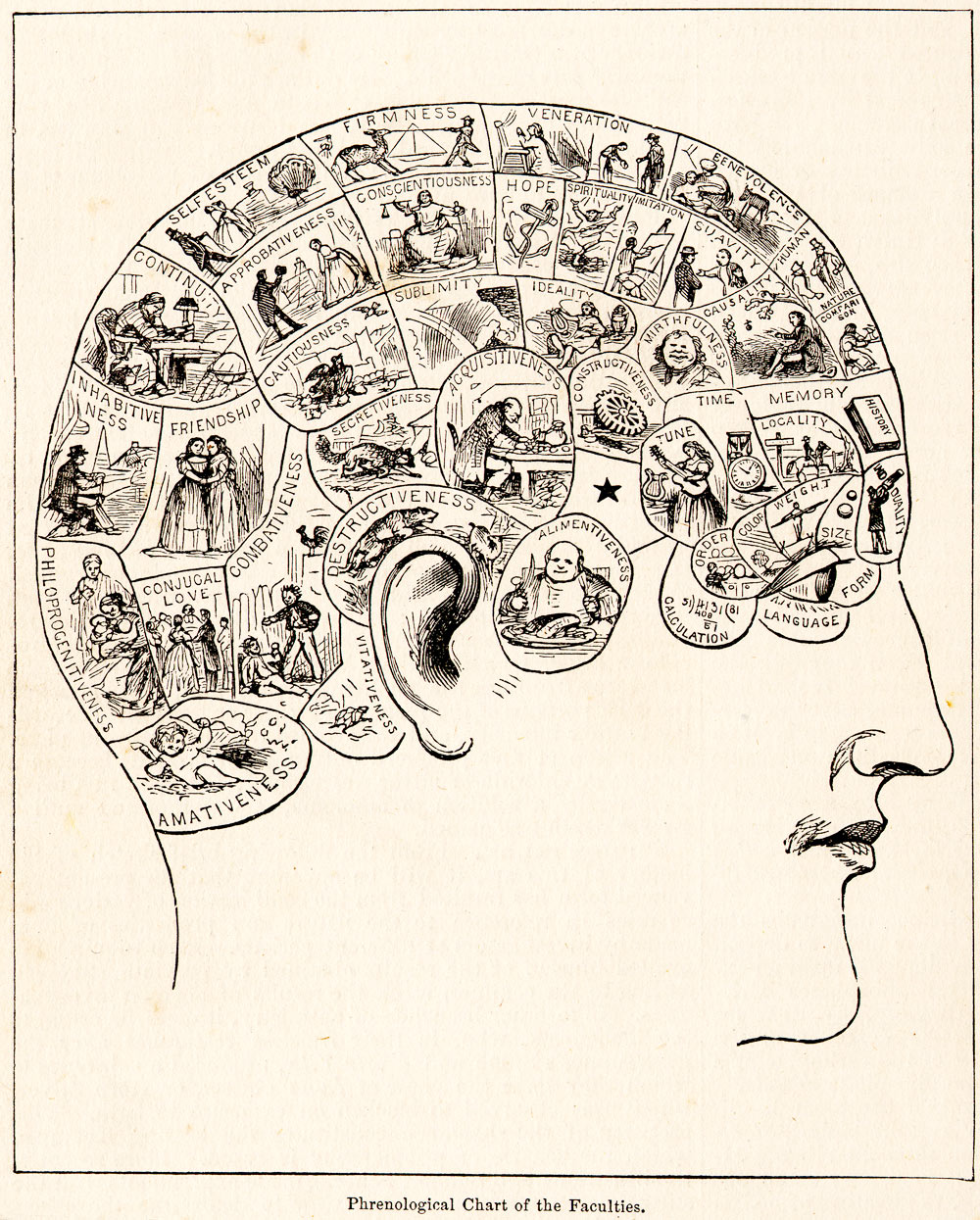
The idea of modularity of mind was presaged by Franz Joseph Gall's 19th century phrenology movement.

The idea can be traced back to the 19th century phrenology movement. Its founder Franz Joseph Gall claimed that mental faculties were associated with specific regions of the brain. Hence, someone's level of intelligence, for example, could be "read off" from the size of a particular bump on his posterior parietal lobe. This simplistic view of modularity has been disproven in the 20th century.

Fodor revived the idea of modularity, without the notion of precise physical localizability, in the 1980s, and became a vocal proponent of it with the 1983 publication of his monograph The Modularity of Mind, where he points to Gall through Bernard Hollander's In search of the soul. Two properties of modularity, informational encapsulation and domain specificity, make it possible to relate functional architecture to mental content. A person's ability to elaborate information independently from their background beliefs allows Fodor to give an atomistic and causal account of mental content. The main idea is that the properties of the contents of mental states can depend, not just on the internal relations of the system of which they are a part, but also on their causal relations with the external world.

==== Adoption by cognitive and evolutionary psychologists ====
Fodor's notions of mental modularity, informational encapsulation and domain specificity were taken up and expanded, much to Fodor's chagrin, by cognitive scientists such as Zenon Pylyshyn and evolutionary psychologists such as Steven Pinker and Henry Plotkin. Fodor complained that Pinker, Plotkin and other members of what he sarcastically called "the New Synthesis" had taken modularity and similar ideas way too far. He insisted that the mind is not "massively modular" and that, contrary to these researchers, the mind was a long way from having been explained by the computational, or any other, model. The main reason for this is that most cognition is abductive and global, hence sensitive to all possibly relevant background beliefs to (dis)confirm a belief. This creates the frame problem for the computational theory, because the relevance of a belief is not one of its local, syntactic properties but context-dependent.

=== Intentional realism ===
In A Theory of Content and Other Essays (1990), Fodor takes up another of his central notions: the question of the reality of mental representations. He sought to justify representational realism, so as to justify the idea that the contents of mental states are expressed in symbolic structures such as those of the LOT.

==== Fodor's criticism of Dennett ====
Fodor starts with some criticisms of so-called standard realism. This view is characterized, according to Fodor, by two distinct assertions. One of these regards the internal structure of mental states and asserts that such states are non-relational. The other concerns the semantic theory of mental content and asserts that there is an isomorphism between the causal roles of such contents and the inferential web of beliefs. Among modern philosophers of mind, the majority view seems to be that the first of these two assertions is false, but that the second is true. Fodor departs from this view in accepting the truth of the first thesis but rejecting strongly the truth of the second.

In particular, Fodor criticizes the instrumentalism of Daniel Dennett. Dennett maintains that it is possible to be realist with regard to intentional states without having to commit oneself to the reality of mental representations. Now, according to Fodor, if one remains at this level of analysis, then there is no possibility of explaining why the intentional strategy works:

There is ... a standard objection to instrumentalism ...: it is difficult to explain why the psychology of beliefs/desires works so well, if the psychology of beliefs/desires is, in fact, false.... As Putnam, Boyd and others have emphasized, from the predictive successes of a theory to the truth of that theory there is surely a presumed inference; and this is even more likely when ... we are dealing with the only theory in play which is predictively crowned with success. It is not obvious ... why such a presumption should not militate in favour of a realist conception ... of the interpretations of beliefs/desires.

=== Productivity, systematicity and thought ===
==== Building on Chomsky ====
Fodor also has positive arguments in favour of the reality of mental representations in terms of the LOT. He maintains that if language is the expression of thoughts and language is systematic, then thoughts must also be systematic. Fodor draws on the work of Noam Chomsky to both model his theory of the mind and to refute alternative architectures such as connectionism. Systematicity in natural languages was explained by Chomsky in terms of two more basic concepts: productivity and compositionality.

Productivity is a representational system's unbounded ability to generate new representations from a given set of symbols, using its cognitive architecture. "John", "loves", and "Mary" allow for the construction of the sentences "John loves Mary" and "Mary loves John". Fodor's language of thought theorizes that representations are decomposable into constituent parts, and these decomposed representations are built into new strings.

More important than productivity is systematicity since it does not rely on questionable idealizations about human cognition. The argument states that a cognizer is able to understand some sentence in virtue of understanding another. For example, no one who understands "John loves Mary" is unable to understand "Mary loves John", and no one who understands "P and Q" is unable to understand "P". Systematicity itself is rarely challenged as a property of natural languages and logics, but some challenge that thought is systematic in the same way languages are. Still others from the connectionist tradition have tried to build non-classical networks that can account for the apparent systematicity of language.

The fact that systematicity and productivity depend on the compositional structure of language means that language has a combinatorial semantics. If thought also has such a combinatorial semantics, then, Fodor stated, there must be a language of thought.

==== Formalizing thought processes ====
The second argument that Fodor provides in favour of representational realism involves the processes of thought. This argument touches on the relation between the representational theory of mind and models of its architecture. If the sentences of Mentalese require unique processes of elaboration then they require a computational mechanism of a certain type. The syntactic notion of mental representations goes hand in hand with the idea that mental processes are calculations which act only on the form of the symbols which they elaborate. And this is the computational theory of the mind. Consequently, the defence of a model of architecture based on classic artificial intelligence passes inevitably through a defence of the reality of mental representations.

For Fodor, this formal notion of thought processes also has the advantage of highlighting the parallels between the causal role of symbols and the contents which they express. In his view, syntax plays the role of mediation between the causal role of the symbols and their contents. The semantic relations between symbols can be "imitated" by their syntactic relations. The inferential relations which connect the contents of two symbols can be imitated by the formal syntax rules which regulate the derivation of one symbol from another.

=== The nature of content ===
From the beginning of the 1980s, Fodor adhered to a causal notion of mental content and of meaning. This idea of content contrasts sharply with the inferential role semantics to which he subscribed earlier in his career. Fodor went on to criticize inferential role semantics (IRS) because its commitment to an extreme form of holism excludes the possibility of a true naturalization of the mental. But naturalization must include an explanation of content in atomistic and causal terms.

==== Anti-holism ====
Fodor, while following W.V.O. Quine's confirmation holism, criticised semantic holism, the idea that every connection of a concept is part of its meaning. The identity of the content of a mental state, under semantic holism, can only be determined by the totality of its epistemic bonds. Fodor argued that this makes the realism of mental states an impossibility:

If people differ in an absolutely general way in their estimations of epistemic relevance, and if we follow the holism of meaning and individuate intentional states by way of the totality of their epistemic bonds, the consequence will be that two people (or, for that matter, two temporal sections of the same person) will never be in the same intentional state. Therefore, two people can never be subsumed under the same intentional generalizations. And, therefore, intentional generalization can never be successful. And, therefore again, there is no hope for an intentional psychology.

==== The asymmetric causal theory ====
Having criticized the idea that semantic evaluation concerns only the internal relations between the units of a symbolic system, Fodor can adopt an externalist position with respect to mental content and meaning. For Fodor, later in his life, the problem of naturalization of the mental is tied to the possibility of giving "the sufficient conditions for which a piece of the world is relative to (expresses, represents, is true of) another piece" in non-intentional and non-semantic terms. If this goal is to be achieved within a representational theory of the mind, then the challenge is to devise a causal theory which can establish the interpretation of the primitive non-logical symbols of the LOT. Fodor's initial proposal is that what determines that the symbol for "water" in Mentalese expresses the property H_{2}O is that the occurrences of that symbol are in certain causal relations with water. The intuitive version of this causal theory is what Fodor calls the "Crude Causal Theory". According to this theory, the occurrences of symbols express the properties which are the causes of their occurrence. The term "horse", for example, says of a horse that it is a horse. In order to do this, it is necessary and sufficient that certain properties of an occurrence of the symbol "horse" be in a law-like relation with certain properties which determine that something is an occurrence of horse.

The main problem with this theory is that of erroneous representations. There are two unavoidable problems with the idea that "a symbol expresses a property if it is ... necessary that all and only the presences of such a property cause the occurrences". The first is that not all horses cause occurrences of horse. The second is that not only horses cause occurrences of horse. Sometimes the A(horses) are caused by A (horses), but at other times—when, for example, because of the distance or conditions of low visibility, one has confused a cow for a horse—the A (horses) are caused by B (cows). In this case the symbol A doesn't express just the property A, but the disjunction of properties A or B. The crude causal theory is therefore incapable of distinguishing the case in which the content of a symbol is disjunctive from the case in which it isn't. This gives rise to what Fodor calls the "problem of disjunction".

Fodor responds to this problem with what he defines as "a slightly less crude causal theory". According to this approach, it is necessary to break the symmetry at the base of the crude causal theory. Fodor must find some criterion for distinguishing the occurrences of A caused by As (true) from those caused by Bs (false). The point of departure, according to Fodor, is that while the false cases are ontologically dependent on the true cases, the reverse is not true. There is an asymmetry of dependence, in other words, between the true contents (A= A) and the false ones (A=A or B). The first can subsist independently of the second, but the second can occur only because of the existence of the first:

From the point of view of semantics, errors must be accidents: if in the extension of "horse" there are no cows, then it cannot be required for the meaning of "horse" that cows be called horses. On the other hand, if "horse" did not mean that which it means, and if it were an error for horses, it would never be possible for a cow to be called "horse". Putting the two things together, it can be seen that the possibility of falsely saying "this is a horse" presupposes the existence of a semantic basis for saying it truly, but not vice versa. If we put this in terms of the crude causal theory, the fact that cows cause one to say "horse" depends on the fact that horses cause one to say "horse"; but the fact that horses cause one to say "horse" does not depend on the fact that cows cause one to say "horse"...

=== Functionalism ===
During the 1960s, philosophers such as Donald Davidson, Hilary Putnam, and Fodor tried to resolve the puzzle of developing a way to preserve the explanatory efficacy of mental causation and folk psychology while adhering to a materialist vision of the world which did not violate the "generality of physics". Their proposal was, first of all, to reject the then-dominant theories in philosophy of mind: behaviorism and the type identity theory. The problem with logical behaviorism was that it failed to account for causation between mental states and such causation seems to be essential to psychological explanation, especially if one considers that behavior is not an effect of a single mental event/cause but is rather the effect of a chain of mental events/causes. The type-identity theory, on the other hand, failed to explain the fact that radically different physical systems can find themselves in the identical mental state. Besides being deeply anthropocentric (why should humans be the only thinking organisms in the universe?), the identity-type theory also failed to deal with accumulating evidence in the neurosciences that every single human brain is different from all the others. Hence, the impossibility of referring to common mental states in different physical systems manifests itself not only between different species but also between organisms of the same species.

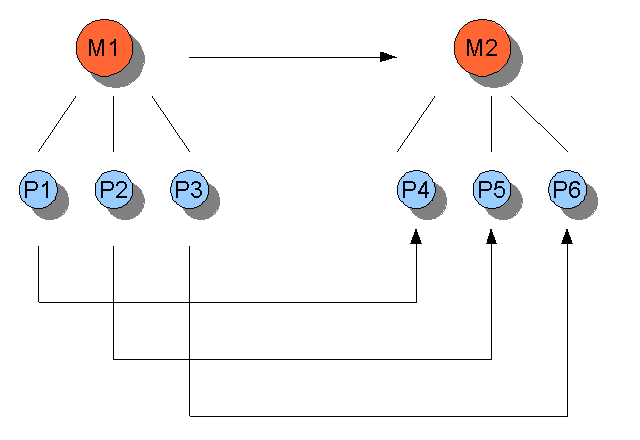
An illustration of multiple realizability. M stands for mental and P stand for physical. The diagram shows that more than one P can instantiate one M, but not vice versa. Causal relations between states are represented by the arrows (M1 goes to M2, etc.).

One can solve these problems, according to Fodor, with functionalism, a hypothesis which was designed to overcome the failings of both dualism and reductionism. What is important is the function of a mental state regardless of the physical substrate which implements it. The foundation for this view lies in the principle of the multiple realizability of the mental. Under this view, for example, I and a computer can both instantiate ("realize") the same functional state though we are made of completely different material stuff (see graphic at right). On this basis functionalism can be classified as a form of token materialism.

=== Evolution ===
Fodor and the biolinguist Massimo Piattelli-Palmarini co-authored the book What Darwin Got Wrong (2010). In the same, the authors argue that much neo-Darwinian literature is "distressingly uncritical" and that Charles Darwin's theory of evolution "overestimates the contribution the environment makes in shaping the phenotype of a species and correspondingly underestimates the effects of endogenous variables". Evolutionary biologist Jerry Coyne describes this book as "a profoundly misguided critique of natural selection" and "as biologically uninformed as it is strident". Moral philosopher and anti-scientism author Mary Midgley praises What Darwin Got Wrong as "an overdue and valuable onslaught on neo-Darwinist simplicities".

== Awards and honors ==
Fodor was a member of the American Academy of Arts and Sciences. He received numerous awards and honors: New York State Regent's Fellowship, Woodrow Wilson Fellowship (Princeton University), Chancellor Greene Fellow (Princeton University), Fulbright Fellowship (University of Oxford), Fellow at the Center for Advanced Study in the Behavioral Sciences, and a Guggenheim Fellowship. He won the first Jean Nicod Prize for philosophy of mind and cognitive philosophy in 1993. His lecture series for the Prize was published as The Elm and the Expert: Mentalese and Its Semantics (1995). In 1996–1997, Fodor delivered the John Locke Lectures at the University of Oxford, titled Concepts: Where Cognitive Science Went Wrong, which went on to become a 1998 book. He also delivered the Patrick Romanell Lecture on Philosophical Naturalism (2004) and the Royce Lecture on Philosophy of Mind (2002) to the American Philosophical Association, of whose Eastern Division he served as President (2005–2006). In 2005, he won the Mind & Brain Prize.

== Criticism ==
Philosophers of diverse orientations have challenged many of Fodor's ideas.

=== Simon Blackburn ===
Simon Blackburn in Spreading the Word (1984) has accused the language of thought hypothesis of falling prey to an infinite regress. If a person understands a word like "dog" through a mental representation which indicates that the word denotes dogs, then a regress takes place. Fodor replies that the language of thought does not involve denoting things. On this view, the process of reasoning works directly to give a result but does not allow the person to examine how it works.

=== Daniel Dennett ===
In 1981, Daniel Dennett formulated another argument against the LOT. Dennett suggested that it would seem, on the basis of the evidence of our behavior toward computers but also with regard to some of our own unconscious behavior, that explicit representation is not necessary for the explanation of propositional attitudes. During a game of chess with a computer program, we often attribute such attitudes to the computer, saying such things as "It thinks that the queen should be moved to the left." We attribute propositional attitudes to the computer and this helps us to explain and predict its behavior in various contexts. Yet no one would suggest that the computer is actually thinking or believing somewhere inside its circuits the equivalent of the propositional attitude "I believe I can kick this guy's butt" in Mentalese. The same is obviously true, suggests Dennett, of many of our everyday automatic behaviors such as "desiring to breathe clear air" in a stuffy environment.

=== Kent Bach ===
Linguists and philosophers of language such as Kent Bach have criticized Fodor's self-proclaimed "extreme" concept nativism. Bach takes Fodor to task for his criticisms of lexical semantics and polysemy. Fodor claims that there is no lexical structure to such verbs as "keep", "get", "make" and "put". He suggests that, alternatively, "keep" simply expresses the concept KEEP (Fodor capitalizes concepts to distinguish them from properties, names or other such entities). If there is a straightforward one-to-one mapping between individual words and concepts, "keep your clothes on", "keep your receipt" and "keep washing your hands" will all share the same concept of KEEP under Fodor's theory. This concept presumably locks on to the unique external property of keeping. But, if this is true, then RETAIN must pick out a different property in RETAIN YOUR RECEIPT, since one can't retain one's clothes on or retain washing one's hands. Fodor's theory also has a problem explaining how the concept FAST contributes, differently, to the contents of FAST CAR, FAST DRIVER, FAST TRACK, and FAST TIME. Whether or not the differing interpretations of "fast" in these sentences are specified in the semantics of English, or are the result of pragmatic inference, is a matter of debate. Fodor's own response to this kind of criticism is expressed bluntly in Concepts: "People sometimes used to say that exist must be ambiguous because look at the difference between 'chairs exist' and 'numbers exist'. A familiar reply goes: the difference between the existence of chairs and the existence of numbers seems, on reflection, strikingly like the difference between numbers and chairs. Since you have the latter to explain the former, you don't also need 'exist' to be polysemic."

Some critics find it difficult to accept Fodor's insistence that a large, perhaps implausible, number of concepts are primitive and undefinable. For example, Fodor considers such concepts as EFFECT, ISLAND, TRAPEZOID, and WEEK to be all primitive, innate and unanalyzable because they all fall into the category of what he calls "lexical concepts" (those for which our language has a single word). Against this view, Bach argues that the concept VIXEN is almost certainly composed out of the concepts FEMALE and FOX, BACHELOR out of SINGLE and MALE, and so on.

=== Fiona Cowie ===
In her 1999 book What's Within, Fiona Cowie argued against Fodor's innatist view, preferring a John Locke-style empiricism. Fodor replied at length in a 1999 article titled "Doing Without What's Within; Fiona Cowie's Critique of Nativism", stating that he was aiming at a position halfway between nativism and empiricism.

== Books ==
- Fodor, Jerry; Katz, Jerrold, eds. (1964). The Structure of Language. Prentice Hall. ISBN 0-13-854703-3.
- -----. Psychological Explanation: An Introduction to the Philosophy of Psychology. Random House, 1968. ISBN 0-07-021412-3.
- ----- Bever, Merrill F.; Garrett, Thomas (1974). The Psychology of Language. McGraw Hill. ISBN 0-394-30663-5.
- ----- (1975). The Language of Thought. Harvard University Press. ISBN 0-674-51030-5.
- ----- (1981). Representations: Philosophical Essays on the Foundations of Cognitive Science. Cambridge, Mass.: MIT Press. ISBN 978-0-262-06079-0.
- ----- (1983). The Modularity of Mind: An Essay in Faculty Psychology. MIT Press. ISBN 978-0-262-56025-2.
- ----- (1987). Psychosemantics: the problem of meaning in the philosophy of mind. MIT Press. ISBN 978-0-262-06106-3.
- ----- (1990). A Theory of Content and Other Essays. MIT Press. ISBN 978-0-262-56069-6.
- ----- Lepore, Ernie (1992). Holism: A Shopper's Guide. Blackwell. ISBN 0-631-18193-8.
- ----- (1993). Lepore, Ernie (ed.). Holism: A Consumer Update. Grazer Philosophische Studien. Vol. 46. Amsterdam: Rodopi. ISBN 90-5183-713-5.
- ----- (1994). The Elm and the Expert: Mentalese and Its Semantics. The 1993 Jean Nicod Lectures. MIT Press. ISBN 0-262-56093-3.
- ----- (1998). Concepts: Where Cognitive Science Went Wrong (PDF). Oxford University Press. p. 54. ISBN 978-0-19-823636-8. Archived from the original (PDF) on September 12, 2006.
- ----- (1998b). In Critical Condition: Polemical Essays on Cognitive Science and the Philosophy of Mind. MIT Press. ISBN 0-262-56128-X.
- ----- (2000). The Mind Doesn't Work That Way:The Scope and Limits of Computational Psychology. MIT Press. ISBN 978-0-262-56146-4.
- ----- (2001). Ferretti, Francesco (ed.). Mente e Linguaggio [Mind and Language] (in Italian). Rome: Editori Laterza. ISBN 978-88-420-6220-2. (edited collection)
- ----- Lepore, Ernie (2002). The Compositionality Papers. Oxford University Press. ISBN 0-19-925216-5.
- ----- (2003). Hume Variations. Oxford University Press. ISBN 0-19-928733-3.
- ----- (2008). LOT 2: The Language of Thought Revisited. Oxford University Press. ISBN 0-19-954877-3.
- ----- Piattelli-Palmarini, Massimo (2010). What Darwin Got Wrong. Farrar, Straus and Giroux. ISBN 0-374-28879-8.
- ----- Pylyshyn, Zenon (2014). Minds without meanings: an essay on the contents of concepts. MIT Press. ISBN 0-262-52981-5.

== See also ==
- Computational theory of mind
- Special sciences

== Sources ==
- Rives, Bradley. "Jerry A. Fodor (1935—2017)". In Fieser, James; Dowden, Bradley (eds.). Internet Encyclopedia of Philosophy. ISSN 2161-0002. OCLC 37741658.
