= Deep Play: Notes on the Balinese Cockfight =

1973 essay by Clifford Geertz

"Deep Play: Notes on the Balinese Cockfight" is an essay by the anthropologist Clifford Geertz included in the book The Interpretation of Cultures (1973). Considered Geertz's most seminal work, it addresses the symbolism and social dynamics of cockfighting (sabungan) in Balinese culture. It is an important example of Geertz's use of "thick description" as an anthropological approach.

== Background ==
In early April 1958, Geertz arrived in a Balinese village with his wife, fellow anthropologist Hildred Geertz. They were "malarial and diffident," and they were largely ignored by the villagers, as they were "intruders, professional ones," as Geertz wrote. The couple moved into an extended family compound, and they initially only interacted with their landlord and village chief.

Ten days after their arrival, the couple viewed their first cockfight. The fight was held to raise money for a new school. At the time, cockfights were illegal in Indonesia, as they had also been under Dutch colonial rule. Geertz attributed the illegality of cockfight to "...pretensions to puritanism radical nationalism tends to bring with it," and he wrote that Indonesian elites found cockfights to be primitive and embarrassing. For these reasons, cockfights were usually held in secluded areas, although some fights were in more central location if bribes and arrangements were made. The couple attended one of these larger matches, which was in a public square. It was broken up by the police, and the crowd rushed away in a panic. The couple fled with the crowd, and they hid from the police in the courtyard of a local man's house. Geertz and his wife were shocked when the man—"[their] host of five minutes"—lied to the police by telling them that Geertz and his wife had not been at the fight but instead had been engaged in ethnographic research, talking to the man and his family about their culture.

The next day, the village opened up to the couple. The experience of hiding from the police in the courtyard allowed Geertz to break the tension between himself and the villagers. As he explained, "...everyone was extremely pleased and even more surprised that we had not simply 'pulled out our papers' (they knew about those too) and asserted our Distinguished Visitor status, but had instead demonstrated our solidarity with what were now our covillagers." However, he also noted that they had fled due to fear, rather than bravery and solidarity. Despite this, they were able to discuss and laugh about the police raid with the village. As Geertz explained, "In Bali, to be teased is to be accepted. It was the turning point so far as our relationship to the community was concerned, and we were quite literally 'in.'" As a result, Geertz was able to perform the interviews and observation which make up The Interpretation of Cultures. The couple stayed in the village for a year, where they attended and observed cockfights.

== Findings ==
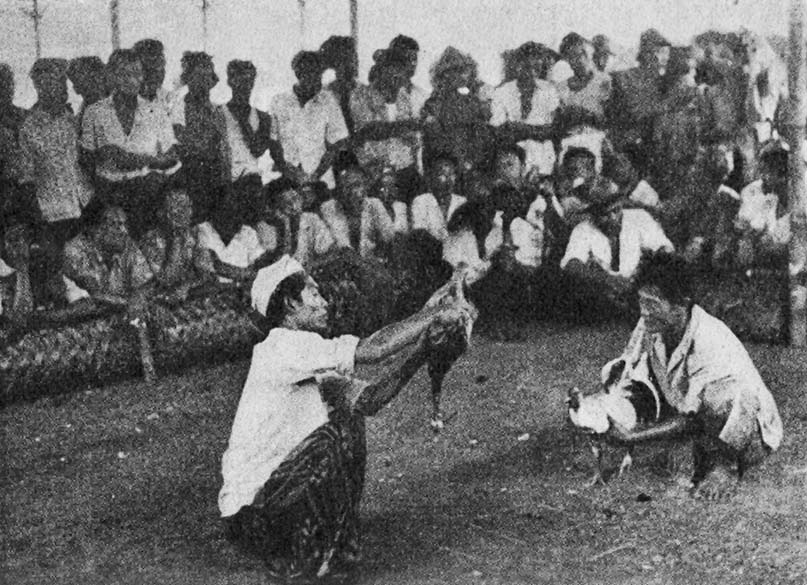
Example of a cockfight in Bali circa 1958.

In "Of Cocks and Men," the second section, the essay describes how cocks are taken to stand in for powerful men in the villages. He notes that even the double-entendre sense of the word "cock" ("Sabung," which also means "hero," "warrior," and "champion") exists in the Balinese language as much as in English. He also wrote of the intimate connection that many Balinese men have with their cocks, which includes grooming them, feeding them, observing them, and discussing them amongst each other. Geertz wrote, "cocks are symbolic expressions or magnifications of their owner's self, the narcissistic male ego writ out in Aesopian terms, they are also expressions--and rather more immediate ones--of what the Balinese regard as the direct inversion, aesthetically, morally, and metaphysically, of human status: animality."

In "The Fight," the third section, the essay describes how cocks are sheltered and fed in preparation of matches, followed by a description of the matches and their rules. The last half of the essay describes the rituals of betting (toh). He concludes that the cockfight serves as the Balinese commentary on themselves, as it embodies the network of social relationships in kin and village that govern traditional Balinese life.

The title of the essay is explained as a concept of British philosopher Jeremy Bentham (1748–1832), who defines "deep play" as a game with stakes so high that no rational person would engage in it. The amounts of money and status involved in the very brief cockfights make Balinese cockfighting "deep play." The problem of explaining why the activity prevails is what Geertz sets out to solve in the essay.
