= Ryle's regress =

In philosophy, Ryle's regress is a classic argument against cognitivist theories, and concludes that such theories are essentially meaningless as they do not explain what they purport to.

== Overview ==
The philosopher Gilbert Ryle was concerned with what he called the intellectualist legend (also known as the "Dogma of the ghost in the machine," the "Two-Lives Legend," the "Two-Worlds Story," or the "Double-Life Legend") which requires intelligent acts to be the product of the conscious application of mental rules. In other words, Ryle argued against Cartesian dualism.

A fine summation of the position which Ryle was defeating is the famous statement by Ralph Waldo Emerson that, "The ancestor of every action is a thought." In sharp contrast to such assertions, which rule out any other possible parentage to actions by the use of the word "every," Ryle argued in The Concept of Mind (1949) that the intellectualist legend results in an infinite regress of thought:

According to the legend, whenever an agent does anything intelligently, his act is preceded and steered by another internal act of considering a regulative proposition appropriate to his practical problem. [...] Must we then say that for the hero's reflections how to act to be intelligent he must first reflect how best to reflect how to act? The endlessness of this implied regress shows that the application of the criterion of appropriateness does not entail the occurrence of a process of considering this criterion. (The Concept of Mind (1949), p. 31.)

The crucial objection to the intellectualist legend is this. The consideration of propositions is itself an operation the execution of which can be more or less intelligent, less or more stupid. But if, for any operation to be intelligently executed, a prior theoretical operation had first to be performed and performed intelligently, it would be a logical impossibility for anyone ever to break into the circle. (The Concept of Mind (1949), p. 31.)

Variants of Ryle's regress are commonly aimed at cognitivist theories. For instance, in order to explain the behavior of rats, Edward Tolman suggested that the rats were constructing a "cognitive map" that helped them locate reinforcers, and he used intentional terms (e.g., expectancies, purposes, meanings) to describe their behavior. This led to a famous attack on Tolman's work by Edwin R. Guthrie who pointed out that if one was implying that every action must be preceded by a cognitive 'action' (a 'thought' or 'schema' or 'script' or whatever), then what 'causes' this act? (a physical feeling perhaps?) Clearly it must be preceded by another cognitive action, which must in turn be preceded by another and so on, in an infinite regress (always a sign that something has gone wrong with a theory). Guthrie's key point is that Tolman's explanation, which attempts to explain animal cognition, does not really explain anything at all.

As a further example, we may take note of the following statement from The Concept of Mind:

The main object of this chapter is to show that there are many activities which directly display qualities of mind, yet are neither themselves intellectual operations nor yet effects of intellectual operations. Intelligent practice is not a step-child of theory. On the contrary theorizing is one practice amongst others and is itself intelligently or stupidly conducted.

In light of Ryle's critique, we may translate the statement by Emerson (still very much in common currency) into: "The ancestor of every action is an action." (This is so, since Ryle notes that, "theorizing is one practice amongst others.") - a reminder of Thomas Aquinas. Or we can go even further and argue that, according to Ryle: "The ancestor of every behavior is a behavior".

As the use of the word 'behaviour' in the sentence above indicates, Ryle's regress arises from the Behaviorist tradition. Near the end of The Concept of Mind, Ryle states

The Behaviorists’ methodological program has been of revolutionary importance to the program of psychology. But more, it has been one of the main sources of the philosophical suspicion that the two-worlds story is a myth. (The Concept of Mind (1949), p. 328.)

Ryle's brand of logical behaviorism is not to be confused with the radical behaviorism of B. F. Skinner, or the methodological behaviorism of John B. Watson. Alex Byrne noted that "Ryle was indeed, as he reportedly said, 'only one arm and one leg a behaviorist'."

Cognitive scientists have Ryle's regress as a potential problem with their theories. A desideratum for those is a principled account of how the (potentially) infinite regress that emerges can be stopped. See also the homunculus fallacy.
