= Postcognitive psychology =

Psychology yet to come

Postcognitive psychology is the postmodern condition of a psychology yet to come as proposed by theorist Matthew Giobbi. The term postcognitive was first used in Giobbi's book A Postcognitive Negation: The Sadomasochistic Dialectic of American Psychology. Psychologists and theorists have discussed the post-cognitive which Giobbi differentiates by exclusion of the hyphen. Giobbi's postcognitive is a folding upon itself in a non-linear fashion which transcends the narrative function of the hyphen, thus leaving the field on a plateau of new ways of doing psychology.
