= Logical behaviorism =

Theory in the philosophy of mind

In the philosophy of mind, logical behaviorism (also known as analytical behaviorism, dispositional behaviorism or philosophical behaviorism) is the thesis that the meaning of mental concepts can be explained in terms of behavioral concepts.

Logical behaviorism was first stated by the Vienna Circle, especially Rudolf Carnap. Other philosophers with sympathies for behaviorism included C. G. Hempel, Ludwig Wittgenstein, and W. V. O. Quine. A more moderate form of analytical behaviorism was put forward by the Oxford philosopher Gilbert Ryle in his book The Concept of Mind (1949).

== Overview ==
Generally speaking, analytic behaviourism is the view that propositions about the mind, or about mental states more generally, are reducible to propositions about behaviour. For example, a dualist would take 'Finbarr is in pain' to refer to a private, non-physical mental state within Finbarr's mind. But a behaviourist would say that 'Finbarr is in pain' simply refers to Finbarr's behaviour, or his disposition to behave in a certain way. So, the behaviourist might argue that if Finbarr was crying, and this was the reason that the mental state of pain was attributed to Finbarr, then 'Finbarr is in pain' reduces to 'Finbarr is crying'. In other words, 'Finbarr is in pain' means the same thing as 'Finbarr is crying' as, for a behaviourist, statements about mental states merely refer to people's behaviour, or their dispositions to show certain behaviour (pain behaviour, in Finbarr's case).

== Gilbert Ryle ==
Following Hempel's behaviourist theory (sometimes called hard behaviourism), which alleged that all propositions about mental states were reducible, without loss of meaning, to propositions about bodily states and behaviour, Gilbert Ryle produced a modified, less extreme form of behaviourism (sometimes called soft behaviourism). Ryle sets out in The Concept of Mind to destroy the illusion of Cartesian dualism, which he says has produced a widespread acceptance of the 'dogma of the ghost in the machine' – the belief that the mind is an immaterial 'thing' caged within a body. To introduce his behaviourism, Ryle proposes his great criticism of Cartesianism: that it performs a category mistake. Ryle believes that mind–body dualism mistakenly puts the mind in the category of a 'thing', a non-physical entity that exists, driving our actions. But, says Ryle, the mind is not a thing. It is simply a way of talking about behaviour, specifically the dispositions of people to act in certain ways. So, whereas for Hempel 'Finbarr is in pain' reduces to 'Finbarr is crying', Ryle's soft dispositional analysis might say that it means 'Finbarr has a disposition to cry, or shout in pain, or hold onto something for support'. In other words, the mind is not a thing; propositions about mental states are instead a way to express the dispositions of people to act in certain ways.

== Criticism ==
Hilary Putnam criticises behaviourism by arguing that it confuses the symptoms of mental states (behaviour) with the mental states themselves. Mental states, says Putnam, are distinct from behaviour, and this is something that behaviourism overlooks. Putnam proposes a thought experiment intended to demonstrate the distinctness of mental states from behaviour and thereby show that behaviourism is false. In "Brains and Behavior", Putnam gives the example of 'X-Worlders', sometimes called 'super-super Spartans'. These are great warriors who have so strongly repressed the urge to display signs of pain that they no longer have any pain behaviour, nor any disposition to display pain behaviour. When an X-Worlder is stabbed, they feel a terrible pain, and yet they show no pain behaviour, nor do they feel any disposition to show their pain. This, says Putnam, shows behaviourism to be false- in this situation, there is no corresponding behaviour with the X-Worlder's pain, showing mental states to be distinct from behaviour.

== Etymology ==
Logical behaviorism is called "logical", after the idea adopted by Bertrand Russell, that mathematics can be described in terms of formal logic, using Set Theory, and thus make it "scientific", "provable", "specific", consistent and "truthful". In a similar way, it was thought by the Vienna Circle that the phenomena of human mental states such as feelings, perceptions, imaginations etc. can be described in terms of a tendency to behave in a certain way, which could then be tested and explained scientifically through the methods of behaviorism, whereby everything consists of stimulus–response pairs, with various types of origins and different types of reinforcement.

== See also ==
- Methodological behaviorism
