= Schirmacher =

Schirmacher is a German surname. Notable people with the surname include:

- Käthe Schirmacher (1865–1930), German writer, journalist, and political activist
- Wolfgang Schirmacher (born 1944), German philosopher
