= Ullin Place =

British philosopher and psychologist (1924–2000)

- Born: Ullin Thomas Place; 24 October 1924; Northallerton, Yorkshire, England
- Died: 2 January 2000 (aged 75); Thirsk, North Yorkshire, England

Education
- Education: Corpus Christi College, Oxford (BA, MA, DipAnth); University of Adelaide (DLitt)
- Academic advisor: Gilbert Ryle

Philosophical work
- Era: 20th-century philosophy
- Region: Western philosophy
- School: Analytic philosophy Australian realism Logical behaviorism
- Institutions: University of Adelaide; University of Chicago; Aston University; University of Leeds; University of Amsterdam; Bangor University
- Main interests: Philosophy of mind
- Notable ideas: Mind–brain identity theory

Ullin Thomas Place (24 October 1924 – 2 January 2000) was a British philosopher and psychologist. After an initial posting at the University of Adelaide, he spent the next 28 years practicing clinical psychology and lecturing in both philosophy and psychology, mainly at the University of Leeds. His 1956 paper "Is Consciousness a Brain Process?" launched the identity theory of mind.

== Life ==
Place was born on 24 October 1924 in Northallerton, North Riding of Yorkshire.

He was educated at Rugby School. He won an Open Scholarship to Corpus Christi College, Oxford in 1942 and spent a term there but his studies were interrupted by the Second World War. In 1943 he registered as a conscientious objector and worked in the Friends' Ambulance Service for the remainder of the war (his mother's ancestors being Quakers). He returned to Oxford in 1946, graduating in philosophy and psychology in 1949 and taking a diploma in anthropology in 1950.

He studied under and was strongly influenced by Gilbert Ryle at Oxford University. There, he became acquainted with philosophy of mind in the logical behaviourist tradition, of which Ryle was a major exponent. Although he would later abandon logical behaviourism as a theory of the mind in favour of the type identity theory, Place nevertheless continued to harbour sympathies toward the behaviouristic approach to psychology in general. He even went so far as to defend the radical behaviourist theses of B. F. Skinner, as expressed in Verbal Behavior (1957), from the criticisms of Noam Chomsky and the growing movement of cognitive psychology.

Place, as well as J. J. C. Smart, nevertheless established his place in the annals of analytic philosophy by founding the theory which would eventually help to dethrone and displace philosophical behaviourism – the identity theory. In "Is Consciousness a Brain Process?" Place formulated the thesis that mental processes were not to be defined in terms of behaviour; rather, one must identify them with neural states. With this bold thesis, Place became one of the fathers of the current materialistic mainstream of the philosophy of mind.

Place died in Thirsk, North Yorkshire on 2 January 2000. He bequeathed his brain to the University of Adelaide.

His sister, Dorothy E. Smith, was a prominent Canadian sociologist and the founder of the field of institutional ethnography, and his brother, Milner Place, was one of England's leading poets.

== Place's identity theory vs. that of Feigl and Smart ==
There are actually subtle but interesting differences between the three most widely credited formulations of the type identity thesis, those of Place, Feigl and Smart which were published in several articles in the late 1950s. Place's notion of the identity involved in the identity thesis is derived from Bertrand Russell's distinction among several types of is statements: the is of identity, the is of equality and the is of predication. Place's version of the relation of identity in the so-called identity thesis is more accurately described as an asymmetric relation of composition. For Place, higher-level mental events are composed out of lower-level physical events and will eventually be analytically reduced to these. To the objection that "sensations" do not mean the same thing as "brain processes", Place could simply reply with the example that "lightning" does not mean the same thing as "electrical discharge" since we determine that something is lightning by looking and seeing it, whereas we determine that something is an electrical discharge through experimentation and testing. Nevertheless, "lightning is an electrical discharge" is true since the one is composed of the other. Similarly, "clouds are water vapor" means that "clouds are composed of droplets of water vapor" but not vice versa.

For Feigl and Smart, on the other hand, the identity was to be interpreted as the identity between the referents of two descriptions (senses) which referred to the same thing, as in "the morning star" and "the evening star" both referring to Venus. So to the objection about the lack of equality of meaning between "sensation" and "brain process", their response was to invoke this Fregean distinction: "sensations" and "brain" processes do indeed mean different things but they refer to the same physical phenomenon. Moreover, "sensations are brain processes" is a contingent, not a necessary, identity.

== Works ==
- Graham, George; Valentine, Elizabeth R., eds. (2023) [2004]. Identifying the mind: selected papers of U.T. Place. Philosophy of mind series. New York: Oxford University Press. ISBN 978-0-19-773053-9.
- "Is consciousness a brain process?" (PDF). British Journal of Psychology. 47 (1): 44–50. 1956. doi:10.1111/j.2044-8295.1956.tb00560.x. ISSN 0007-1269.
- "Skinner's "Verbal Behavior I" - Why We Need It". Behaviorism. 9 (1): 1–24. 1981. ISSN 0090-4155.
