= Passagen Verlag =

The publishing house Passagen Verlag was founded in 1985 in Vienna by Peter Engelmann. The primary intention of the publisher was the translation of Jacques Derrida's work into German. Around the author Derrida, Peter Engelmann developed a program, which gathers relevant authors of all disciplines, who identified themselves with the program deconstruction ("Dekonstruktivismus") and "postmodernism" (Postmoderne). Peter Engelmann was honoured by the French State in February 2004 with the title "Commandeur dans l´ordre des Arts et des Lettres" for his work as a publisher.

The Passagen Verlag, the name Passagen being an allusion to Walter Benjamin's most important text Passagenwerk, publishes besides Derrida authors such as Jean-François Lyotard, Gianni Vattimo, Jean Baudrillard, Paul Feyerabend, Peter Eisenman, Jacques Lacan, Ernesto Laclau, Chantal Mouffe, Sarah Kofman, Gerhard Anna Concic-Kaucic, Slavoj Žižek, Emmanuel Levinas, Clifford Geertz, Ginka Steinwachs, Dennis Cooper, Wolfgang Schirmacher, etc.
