= Non-physical entity =

Object that exists outside physical reality

In ontology and the philosophy of mind, a non-physical entity is an object that exists outside physical reality. The philosophical schools of idealism and dualism assert that such entities exist, while physicalism asserts that they do not. Positing the existence of non-physical entities leads to further questions concerning their inherent nature and their relation to physical entities.

== Abstract concepts ==
Philosophers generally do agree on the existence of abstract objects. The mind can conceive of objects that clearly have no physical counterpart. Such objects include concepts such as numbers, mathematical sets and functions, and philosophical relations and properties. If such objects are indeed entities, they are entities that exist only in the mind itself, or in some other non-spatiotemporal manner (i.e., not within space and time). For an example, an abstract property such as redness has no presence in space-time. To make a distinction between metaphysics and epistemology, such objects, if they are to be considered entities, are categorized as logical entities, in order to distinguish them from physical entities. While older Cartesian dualists held the existence of non-physical minds, more limited forms of dualism propounded by 20th and 21st century philosophers (such as property dualism) hold merely the existence of non-physical properties.

== Mind–body dualism ==
Dualism is the division of two contrasted or opposed aspects. The dualist school supposes the existence of non-physical entities, the most widely discussed one being the mind, but beyond that it runs into stumbling blocks. Pierre Gassendi put one such problem directly to René Descartes in 1641, in response to Descartes's Meditations:

[It] still remains to be explained how that union and apparent intermingling [of mind and body ...] can be found in you, if you are incorporeal, unextended and indivisible [...]. How, at least, can you be united with the brain, or some minute part in it, which (as has been said) must yet have some magnitude or extension, however small it be? If you are wholly without parts how can you mix or appear to mix with its minute subdivisions? For there is no mixture unless each of the things to be mixed has parts that can mix with one another.

— Gassendi 1641

Descartes's response to Gassendi, and to Princess Elizabeth who asked him similar questions in 1643, is generally considered nowadays to be lacking, because it did not address what is known in the philosophy of mind as the interaction problem. This is a problem for non-physical entities as posited by dualism: by what mechanism, exactly, do they interact with physical entities, and how can they do so? Interaction with physical systems requires physical properties which a non-physical entity does not possess.

Dualists either, like Descartes, avoid the problem by considering it impossible for a non-physical mind to conceive the relationship that it has with the physical, and so impossible to explain philosophically, or assert that the questioner has made the fundamental mistake of thinking that the distinction between the physical and the non-physical is such that it prevents each from affecting the other.

Other questions about the non-physical which dualism has not answered include such questions as how many minds each person can have, which is not an issue for physicalism which can simply declare one-mind-per-person almost by definition; and whether non-physical entities such as minds and souls are simple or compound, and if the latter, what "stuff" the compounds are made from.

Christian List argues that Benj Hellie's vertiginous question, i.e. why people exist as themselves and not as someone else, and the existence of first-personal facts, are a refutation of physicalist philosophies of consciousness. List makes this claim on the basis of supervenience, and argues that first personal facts cannot supervene on third personal facts. However, List also argues that this also refutes standard versions of mind-body dualism that have purely third-personal metaphysics.

== Spirits ==
Describing in philosophical terms what a non-physical entity actually is (or would be) can prove problematic. A convenient example of what constitutes a non-physical entity is a ghost. Gilbert Ryle once labelled Cartesian dualism as positing the "ghost in the machine". However, it is hard to define in philosophical terms what it is, precisely, about a ghost that makes it a specifically non-physical, rather than a physical entity. Were the existence of ghosts ever demonstrated beyond doubt, it has been claimed that would actually place them in the category of physical entities.

Purported non-mental non-physical entities include things such as deities, angels, demons, and ghosts. Lacking physical demonstrations of their existence, their existences and natures are widely debated, independently of the philosophy of mind.

== See also ==
- Problem of universals, a debate about the existence of properties
