= Symbolic anthropology =

Study of cultural symbols

Symbolic anthropology or, more broadly, symbolic and interpretive anthropology, is the study of cultural symbols and how those symbols can be used to gain a better understanding of a particular society. According to Clifford Geertz, "[b]elieving, with Max Weber, that man is an animal suspended in webs of significance he himself has spun, I take culture to be those webs, and the analysis of it to be therefore not an experimental science in search of law but an interpretive one in search of meaning". In theory, symbolic anthropology assumes that culture lies within the basis of the individuals' interpretation of their surrounding environment, and that it does not in fact exist beyond the individuals themselves. Furthermore, the meaning assigned to people's behavior is molded by their culturally established symbols. Symbolic anthropology aims to thoroughly understand the way meanings are assigned by individuals to certain things, leading then to a cultural expression. There are two majorly recognized approaches to the interpretation of symbolic anthropology, the interpretive approach, and the symbolic approach. Both approaches are products of different figures, Clifford Geertz (interpretive) and Victor Turner (symbolic). There is also another key figure in symbolic anthropology, David M. Schneider, who does not particularly fall into either of the schools of thought. Symbolic anthropology follows a literary basis instead of an empirical one meaning there is less of a concern with objects of science such as mathematics or logic, instead focusing on tools like psychology and literature. That is not to say fieldwork is not done in symbolic anthropology, but the research interpretation is assessed in a more ideological basis.

Prominent figures in symbolic anthropology include Clifford Geertz, David M. Schneider, Victor Turner and Mary Douglas.

== Different perspectives ==
Clifford Geertz's interpretive approach asserts that humans are in need of symbolic "sources of illumination" to orient themselves to the system of meaning in a particular culture. Geertz was influenced largely by sociologist Max Weber and concerned himself more with overall cultural operation. Victor Turner believed that symbols initiate social actions, and are "determinable influences inclining persons and groups to action." Turner's influence came largely from Emile Durkheim, caring more about the way symbols functioned within society. The two different schools of perspective on symbolic anthropology also have their roots in different cultures, the work of Victor Turner traditionally being recognized as the British way of thought, while the work of Clifford Geertz is viewed as the American way.

== Conceptual Terminology ==
The purpose of symbolic and interpretive anthropology can be described through a term used often by Geertz that originated from Gilbert Ryle, "Thick Description." By this what is conveyed, is that since culture and behavior can only be studied as a unit, studying culture and its smaller sections of the structure, thick description is what details the interpretation of those belonging to a certain culture. Victor Turner proposed the concept of "Social Drama" to describe social interactions that entail some sort of conflict in society, proposing their symbolic significance. His model suggests that there are four phases to any conflictive interaction 1 – Breach; 2 – Crisis; 3 – Redress; 4 – Reintegration; each of these can describe the sequence of events that occurs from a drama in any given social relation. In this way Turner displays his theory of this linear ritual in society involving several exhibits of symbolism. Turner states that his theory was derived after observing the Ndembu people's interactions in West-Central Angola in Africa, then later perceiving it among most other people.

== Symbolic anthropology and psychology ==
Anthropology and psychology have influenced one another from very early on, especially due to the influence different figures such as Sigmund Freud, Carl Jung and Claude Lévi-Strauss had on one another. French anthropologist Lévi-Strauss, much like Swiss psychiatrist Jung, wanted to understand the mind through understanding myth. Symbolic or interpretive anthropology emphasizes the individual's interpretation of events, and how that interpretation enhances the more collectively perceived characteristics or rituals of a group. Furthermore, this is the only real difference in the aims of the two fields: one focuses on the collective and the other on the individual. However, one can't draw a clear line between mind culture and the mind, since they both contribute to one another. The two fields involve different data sets and settings, but require similar approaches, in whichever schools of thought is used. There was early hesitation among major figures to integrate the two fields, despite clear overlap in thought, such as Durkheim's and Jung's indirect influence on some of each other's theories. Some dismiss the connection between these two fields, believing that symbolic anthropology cannot be condensed down into psychology in any way, or that culture alone determines behavior, disregarding the role the individual psyche plays in collective traits expressed through thick description.

== Key publications ==
- Geertz, Clifford (1973) The interpretation of cultures, Basic Books, New York
- Geertz, Clifford. (Ed.) (1974) Myth, symbol, and culture, W. W. Norton, New York
- Sahlins, Marshall (1976) Culture and practical reason, University of Chicago Press, Chicago
- Schneider, David (1968) American kinship: A cultural account. Prentice-Hall, New Jersey
- Turner, Victor (1967) The forest of symbols: Aspects of Ndembu ritual, Cornell University Press, Ithaca
- Turner, Victor (1974) Dramas, fields and metaphors: Symbolic action in human society, Cornell University Press, Ithaca

== See also ==
- Collective unconscious
- Interpretive sociology
- Semiotic anthropology
- Max Weber
