= Ghost in the Machine =

Ghost in the machine is a philosophical term relating to mind–body dualism.

Ghost in the Machine may also refer to:

== Literature ==
- The Ghost in the Machine, a 1967 book by Arthur Koestler
- Ghost in the Machine (novel), a 2009 children's supernatural mystery novel by Patrick Carman
- A Ghost in the Machine, a 2004 mystery novel by Caroline Graham
- Tron: The Ghost in the Machine, a comic book miniseries

== Television ==
- "Ghost in the Machine" (The 4400), an episode of The 4400
- "Ghost in the Machines", an episode of Futurama
- "Ghost in the Machine" (Frankie Drake Mysteries), a 2021 episode
- "Ghost in the Machine" (The Morning Show), an episode of The Morning Show
- "Ghost in the Machine" (Stargate Atlantis), an episode of Stargate Atlantis
- "Ghost in the Machine" (The X-Files), an episode of The X-Files
- "The Ghost in the Machine", an episode of eighth season of the television series Bones
- "Ghost in the Machine", an episode of Medium
- "Ghosts in the Machine", an episode of Caprica
- "Ghost in the Machine", an episode of CSI Cyber
- "Ghost in the Machine", a two-part episode of Degrassi: The Next Generation
- "The Ghost in the Machine", an episode of Falling Skies
- "Ghost in the Machine", an episode of Father Brown
- "Ghost in the Machine", is the ninth episode of the 1990 series The Flash
- "Ghost in the Machine", an episode of Ghost Whisperer
- "Ghost in the Machine", an episode of Inspector Morse
- "Ghost in the Machine", an episode of Kyle XY
- "The Machine in the Ghost", a short of Star Wars Rebels
- "Ghost in the Machine", an episode of Superman: The Animated Series
- "Ghost in the Machine", an episode of The Transformers
- "Ghost in the Machine", the 26th season opener episode of Law & Order.

== Music ==
=== Albums ===
- Ghost in the Machine (album), a 1981 album by The Police
- Ghosts in the Machine, a 2006 album by Switched

=== Songs ===
- "Ghost in the Machine" (song), a song by SZA from the album SOS (2022), featuring Phoebe Bridgers
- "Ghost In The Machine", a song by Blaze from Silicon Messiah
- "Ghost in the Machine", a song by B.o.B from B.o.B Presents: The Adventures of Bobby Ray
- "Ghost in the Machine", a 2015 song by Blasterjaxx & MOTi, featuring Jonathan Mendelsohn
- "Ghost in the Machine", a song by Ghost Town (feat. Chris Shelley)
- "Ghost in the Machine", a song by Logic on the album Ultra 85 (2024)
- "Machine in the Ghost", a song by The Faint from Fasciinatiion
- "Ghost In The Machine", a song by Nine Inch Nails on the album Tron: Ares (2025)

=== Orchestral music ===
- The Ghost in the Machine, a 1990 composition by John Woolrich

== Other arts ==
- Ghost in the Machine (artwork), a 1983 performance art work by Linda Nishio
- Ghost in the Machine (1993 film), a horror and science fiction film starring Karen Allen
- Ghost in the Machine (2026 film), a documentary film which explores artificial intelligence

== See also ==
- Ghost in the Shell (disambiguation)
- Ghost Machine (disambiguation)
- Deus ex machina, "God from the machine"
