= Im Null =

2014 video game

Im null
- Developer: Zak Ayles
- Programmer: Devin Horsman
- Composer: Robin Arnott
- Engine: Unity
- Platform: Browser
- Release: November 2014
- Genre: Walking simulator
- Mode: Multiplayer

Im Null (stylized Im null) is a 2014 video game by Austin-based independent developer Zak Ayles. Described as a "virtual horror art gallery", Im null is an experimental multiplayer game in which players explore wireframe environments. Im null received praise from critics for its experimental gameplay and themes of isolation and connection. After a period of incompatibility of Unity Web Player games on modern web browsers, Ayles restored the game on his personal website in August 2022 with the help of Ryder Cutler.

== Gameplay ==
Gameplay screenshot

The game is a multiplayer game, although the involvement of other players is passive, represented by vertical lines, and there is no direct form of interaction or communication between players. Players input a string of numbers at the start of the game, which is the only way they are identifiable to other players. The game is open-ended, without any goals or direction, and consists of exploration through the stark environments in the game. The game also features NULL, a wireframe head described as a ghost in the machine that occasionally appears in the game and seems to move autonomously, such as mimicking the player's movement and chasing them, and has the capacity to "ban" players from the game if caught by removing them from the instance.

== Reception ==
Im null received praise from several critics. Writing for Kill Screen, Chris Priestman described the game as about "experiencing alienation", manifested by "feeling lost in its world...it's difficult to make sense of any it, both individually and as a whole, and that seems to be the point; to feel uncomfortable and unsure." Priestman praised the game's novel approach to multiplayer mechanics, praising the ambiguity of whether NULL is controlled by the developer or an AI as "performance art" and revealing an "aching detachment and a lust for rebellion." consistent with Ayles' other works. In a follow-up review, Priestman continued to praise the game's experience as a "virtual world about alienation" and "eerie realm of nothingness." Similarly, writing for Arcade Review, Heather Alexandra praised the game in its journey for "meaning found during the player's isolation" within the "massive expanses of space" in the game, stating the game "existential examination to prompt reflection in the player, themselves just another object in the void," and discussed the tensions inherent in a multiplayer game focused on isolation. James Renovitch of The Austin Chronicle praised the game's world for its "quiet" nature, its "darkness" and "stark landscape features." Alice O'Connor for Rock Paper Shotgun stated the game was "a weird little cyberworld to explore" and the experience formed "a pleasant few minutes of exploring and gawping."
