= Linda Nishio =

Linda Nishio (born 1952) is a Japanese-American artist whose conceptual pieces focus on self-image and issues of representation, using photographs, text, performance, and film. She worked at the Women's Graphic Center of the Women's Building. Among other work, Nishio created the logo for New World Pictures for film director Roger Corman. She taught at the Otis College of Art and Design in Los Angeles and her work was included in the 2011 citywide exhibition, "Pacific Standard Time: Art in L.A., 1945-1980."

== Early life ==
Raised in Los Angeles, Nishio is a third-generation Japanese-American (sansei) whose parents were two of the 120,000 forcibly relocated Japanese Americans during World War II. She studied art at the University of Kansas and received her Master's of Fine Arts from Rutgers University, where she studied with Geoffrey Hendricks. While still a graduate student, she started making visits to the Woman's Building in Los Angeles, and in 1979 or 1980 moved back to that city. Nishio was hired by the Women's Graphic Center of the Women's Building. Among other work, she created logo for New World Pictures for film director Roger Corman. Her first studio was also at the Women's Building.

== Career ==
Nishio's first public performance, Cheap Talk (Great Wall Series), took place at the Franklin Furnace in New York in 1979. The work combined written and spoken text, slides and film images. She performed Ghost in the Machine two years later at the same space, which was reviewed by Lucy Lippard for the Village Voice, and included in her 1984 book, Get the Message: A Decade of Art for Social Change. Another nonprofit space that showed Nishio's work early in her career (Cheap Talk, in 1980) was LACE in Los Angeles. Her work is in the Artwords and Bookworks collections at the University of Iowa.

In describing her work of this period, Nishio has said,

""The artwork was all about ... the personal is the political. How I saw the world was the material for the artwork, so instead of maybe painting self-portraits, I was making performance: The performance was the self-portrait."

She made an installation for the Santa Monica Museum of Art in 1993 entitled Protekshun (and the Desire to Surrender) and participated in the 2011 exhibition at the Japanese American National Museum, "Drawing the Line: Japanese American Art, Design & Activism in Post-War Los Angeles," part the citywide exhibition, Pacific Standard Time: Art in L.A., 1945-1980.

== Selected works ==
- Cheap Talk (Great Wall Series), 1979
- Kikoemasu Ka (Can You Hear Me?), 1980, owned by LACMA
- Ghost in the Machine, 1981
- Protekshun (and the Desire to Surrender), installation, 1993
