= Gilbert Ryle =

British philosopher (1900–1976)

Major Gilbert Ryle
- Gilbert Ryle (painting by Rex Whistler)
- Born: 19 August 1900; Brighton, England
- Died: 6 October 1976 (aged 76); Whitby, England

Education
- Education: The Queen's College, Oxford

Philosophical work
- Region: Western philosophy
- School: Analytic philosophy; logical behaviourism
- Doctoral students: Colin Radford; Daniel Dennett
- Notable students: Theodor W. Adorno; A. J. Ayer; G. A. Cohen; John M. Cooper; Antony Flew; Þorsteinn Gylfason; G. E. L. Owen; U. T. Place; Bernard Williams; Peter Winch
- Main interests: Philosophy of language; ordinary language philosophy; philosophy of mind; behaviourism; meaning; cognition
- Notable ideas: Category mistake; Ryle's regress; ordinary language philosophy; ghost in the machine; thick description vs thin description; knowing-how vs. knowing-that; topic neutrality

Gilbert Ryle (19 August 1900 – 6 October 1976) was a British philosopher, principally known for his critique of Cartesian dualism, for which he coined the phrase "ghost in the machine". Some of Ryle's ideas in philosophy of mind have been called logical behaviourist. In his best-known book, The Concept of Mind (1949), he writes that the "general trend of this book will undoubtedly, and harmlessly, be stigmatised as 'behaviourist'." Having studied the philosophers Bernard Bolzano, Franz Brentano, Alexius Meinong, Edmund Husserl, and Martin Heidegger, Ryle suggested that the book instead "could be described as a sustained essay in phenomenology, if you are at home with that label."

== Biography ==
=== Early life and education ===
Gilbert Ryle was born in Brighton, England, on 19 August 1900, and grew up in an environment of learning.

He was educated at Brighton College and in 1919 went up to The Queen's College at Oxford to study classics, but was soon drawn to philosophy. He graduated with a "triple first"; he received first-class honours in classical Honour Moderations (1921), literae humaniores (1923), and philosophy, politics, and economics (1924).

=== Career ===
In 1924, Ryle was appointed lecturer in philosophy at Christ Church, Oxford. A year later, he became a fellow and tutor at Christ Church, where he remained until 1940.

In the Second World War, Ryle was commissioned in the Welsh Guards. A capable linguist, he was recruited into intelligence work and by the end of the war had been promoted to the rank of Major. After the war he returned to Oxford and was elected Waynflete Professor of Metaphysical Philosophy and Fellow of Magdalen College, Oxford. He published The Concept of Mind in 1949. He was president of the Aristotelian Society from 1945 to 1946, and editor of the philosophical journal Mind from 1947 to 1971. Ryle died on 6 October 1976 at Whitby, North Yorkshire.

Ryle's brothers John Alfred (1889–1950) and George Bodley (1902–1978), both educated at Brighton College, also had eminent careers. John became Regius Professor of Physic at the University of Cambridge and physician to King George V. George, after serving as Director of Forestry first for Wales and then England, was Deputy-Director of the Forestry Commission and appointed a CBE.

Ryle was the subject of a portrait by Rex Whistler, which he said made him look like "a drowned German General". Michael Dummett recalls Ryle's complaint, adding "but that was exactly what he did look like".

=== Later life ===
In retirement he lived with his twin sister Mary.

== Philosophy ==
Ryle has been characterized as an "ordinary language" philosopher, a style of philosophy he helped pioneer. According to Bryan Magee, Ryle's paper "Systematically Misleading Expressions" (1931) contains the "first clear public statement of the view of philosophy that has come to be known as Linguistic Philosophy", while G.J. Warnock says of his book, The Concept of Mind, that "it was one of the first, and hence has been one of the most widely influential, attacks in the new style upon an old family of problems".

=== The Concept of Mind ===
In The Concept of Mind, Ryle argues that dualism involves category mistakes and philosophical nonsense, two philosophical topics that continued to inform Ryle's work. He rhetorically asked students in his 1967–68 Oxford audience what was wrong with saying that there are three things in a field: two cows and a pair of cows. They were also invited to ponder whether the bunghole of a beer barrel is part of the barrel or not.

==== Knowing-how and knowing-that ====
A distinction deployed in The Concept of Mind, between 'knowing-how' and 'knowing-that', has attracted independent interest. This distinction is also the origin of procedural (knowing-how) and declarative (knowing-that) models of long-term memory. This distinction is widely accepted in philosophy.

Philosophers have not done justice to the distinction which is quite familiar to all of us between knowing that something is the case and knowing how to do things. In their theories of knowledge they concentrate on the discovery of truths or facts, and they either ignore the discovery of ways and methods of doing things or else they try to reduce it to the discovery of facts. They assume that intelligence equates with the contemplation of propositions and is exhausted in this contemplation.

— Gilbert Ryle, Aristotelian Society Presidential Address, 1945.

An example of the distinction can be knowing how to tie a reef knot and knowing that Queen Victoria died in 1901.

=== Philosophy as cartography ===
The philosophical arguments which constitute this book are intended not to increase what we know about minds but to rectify the logical geography of the knowledge we already possess.

Ryle thought it no longer possible to believe that a philosopher's task is to study mental as opposed to physical objects. In its place, Ryle saw a tendency of philosophers to search for objects whose nature was neither physical nor mental. Ryle believed, instead, that "philosophical problems are problems of a certain sort; they are not problems of an ordinary sort about special entities."

Ryle analogises philosophy to cartography. Competent speakers of a language, Ryle believes, are to a philosopher what ordinary villagers are to a mapmaker: the ordinary villager has a competent grasp of his village, and is familiar with its inhabitants and geography. But when asked to interpret a map of that knowledge, the villager will have difficulty until he is able to translate his practical knowledge into universal cartographic terms. The villager thinks of the village in personal and practical terms, while the mapmaker thinks of the village in neutral, public, cartographic terms.

By mapping the words and phrases of a particular statement, philosophers are able to generate what Ryle calls implication threads: each word or phrase of a statement contributes to the statement in that, if the words or phrases were changed, the statement would have a different implication. The philosopher must show the directions and limits of different implication threads that a "concept contributes to the statements in which it occurs." To show this, he must be tugging at neighbouring threads, which, in turn, must also be tugging. Philosophy, then, searches for the meaning of these implication threads in the statements in which they are used.

=== Thick description ===
In 1968 Ryle first introduced the notion of thick description in "The Thinking of Thoughts: What is 'Le Penseur' Doing?" and "Thinking and Reflecting". According to Ryle, there are two types of descriptions:

1. thin description: surface-level observations of behaviour, e.g. "His right hand rose to his forehead, palm out, when he was in the vicinity of and facing a certain other human."
2. thick description: adds context to such behaviour. Explaining this context necessitates an understanding of the motivations people have for their behaviours, as well as how observers in the community understand such behaviour: "He saluted the General."

== Legacy ==
Ryle's notion of thick description has been an important influence on cultural anthropologists such as Clifford Geertz. Peter Strawson, a contemporary of Ryle, paid tribute to him by noting that "by reason of his energy, his authority, and his vision—besides the brilliance and inventiveness displayed in his own philosophical writing—contributed perhaps more than any other single person to the flowering of the subject in England in the years after the war".

The Concept of Mind was recognised on its appearance as an important contribution to philosophical psychology, and an important work in the ordinary language philosophy movement. But in the 1960s and 1970s, the rising influence of the cognitivist theories of Noam Chomsky, Herbert A. Simon, Jerry Fodor, and others in the neo-Cartesian school became predominant. The two major postwar schools in philosophy of mind, Fodor's representationalism and Wilfrid Sellars's functionalism, posited precisely the internal cognitive states that Ryle had argued against. Philosopher Daniel Dennett, a student of Ryle's, has said that recent trends in psychology such as embodied cognition, discursive psychology, situated cognition, and others in the post-cognitivist tradition, have provoked a renewed interest in Ryle's work. Dennett provided a sympathetic foreword to the 2000 edition of The Concept of Mind.

Author Richard Webster endorsed Ryle's arguments against idealist philosophies, suggesting in Why Freud Was Wrong (1995) that they implied that "theories of human nature which repudiate the evidence of behaviour and refer solely or primarily to invisible mental events will never in themselves be able to unlock the most significant mysteries of human nature."

== Personal life ==
He was a lifelong bachelor, and never married.

=== Family ===
Gilbert Ryle's father, Reginald John Ryle, was a Brighton doctor, a generalist who had interests in philosophy and astronomy, passing on to his children a large library. Gilbert's father was a son of John Charles Ryle, the first Anglican Bishop of Liverpool. The Ryles were Cheshire landed gentry; Gilbert's elder brother, John Alfred Ryle, of Barkhale, Sussex, became head of the family.

Gilbert Ryle's mother, Catherine, was daughter of Samuel King Scott (younger brother of the architect Sir George Gilbert Scott) by his wife Georgina, daughter of doctor William Hulme Bodley, and sister of architect George Frederick Bodley, himself a student of Sir George. Cousins of the Ryle family thus include the haematologist Ronald Bodley Scott, architect George Gilbert Scott Jr., founder of Watts & Co., and his son, Giles Gilbert Scott, designer of the Battersea Power Station.

== Works ==
- 1949. The Concept of Mind
- 1954. Dilemmas: The Tarner Lectures 1953, a collection of shorter pieces
- 1962. A Rational Animal, Auguste Comte Memorial Lecture delivered on 26 April 1962 at the London School of Economics and Political Science
- 1966. Plato's Progress
- 1971. Collected Essays 1929–1968, in two volumes, 57 essays
- 1977. Contemporary Aspects of Philosophy, editor
- 1979. On Thinking
