= The Interpretation of Cultures =

1973 book by the American anthropologist Clifford Geertz

The Interpretation of Cultures: Selected Essays
- Cover of the first edition
- Author: Clifford Geertz
- Publisher: Basic Books
- Publication date: 1973
- Media type: Print
- Pages: 470

The Interpretation of Cultures: Selected Essays is a 1973 book by the American anthropologist Clifford Geertz. The book was listed in the Times Literary Supplement as one of the 100 most important publications since World War Two.

== Background ==
At the University of Chicago, Geertz became a champion of symbolic anthropology, a framework which gives prime attention to the role of symbols in constructing public meaning. In The Interpretation of Cultures (1973), Geertz studied culture as text. "Reading" of culture is important. To understand a culture, the organization of social activity, its institutional forms and the system of ideas which animate it must be understood; culture and social structure are two important analytical aspects in the study of culture. The personality of individual human beings, history, symbols (rituals, gestures, practices, tools etc) are important to study a culture.

== Influence ==
Geertz was awarded the Sorokin Award in 1974 by the American Sociological Association "for his brilliant essays on The Interpretation of Cultures." The book is considered to be influential within the anthropological discipline, particularly in terms of the discussion of thick description as a construct for examining social phenomena.

== See also ==
- "Deep Play: Notes on the Balinese Cockfight"
