= Mark R. Woodward =

Mark R. Woodward is an American academic. He is known for his work Islam in Java, published in 1989.

He conducted ethnographic research in the Yogyakarta Indonesia region in the New Order era.

== Critical response ==
Islam in Java elicited a range of responses due to its diverging from Clifford Geertz's observations of almost 30 years before in East Java.

== Publications ==
- Woodward, Mark R. (1989) Islam in Java : normative piety and mysticism in the sultanate of Yogyakarta University of Arizona Press, Tucson: Monographs of the Association for Asian Studies; no. 45. ISBN 0-8165-1103-9 (alk. paper)
- Suwarno, Peter (1999) Dictionary of Javanese proverbs and idiomatic expressions with a foreword by Mark R. Woodward Yogyakarta, Indonesia : Gadjah Mada University Press. ISBN 979-420-452-8
- Woodward, Mark R. (2010) Java, Indonesia and Islam. Springer. ISBN 9789400700567
- Lukens-Bull, Ronald and Mark Woodward (2011) “Goliath and David in Gaza: Indonesian myth-building and conflict as a cultural system.” Contemporary Islam: Dynamics of Muslim Life 5:1-17
