= Postcognitivism =

Movements in cognitive science critical of cognitivism

Movements in cognitive science are considered to be post-cognitivist if they are opposed to or move beyond the cognitivist theories posited by Noam Chomsky, Jerry Fodor, David Marr, and others.

Postcognitivists challenge tenets within cognitivism, including ontological dualism, representational realism, that cognition is independent of processes outside the mind and nervous system, that the electronic computer is an appropriate analogy for the mind, and that cognition occurs only within individuals.

Researchers who have followed post-cognitive directions include Andy Clark, James J. Gibson, Hubert Dreyfus, Gregory Bateson, Michael Turvey, Bradd Shore, Jerome Bruner, Vittorio Guidano, Humberto Maturana and Francisco Varela.

== Hubert Dreyfus' critique of cognitivism ==
Using the principles of Martin Heidegger's philosophy, Dreyfus has been critical of cognitivism from the beginning. Despite continued resistance by old-school philosophers of cognition, he felt vindicated by the growth of new approaches. When Dreyfus' ideas were first introduced in the mid-1960s, they were met with ridicule and outright hostility. By the 1980s, however, many of his perspectives were rediscovered by researchers working in robotics and the new field of connectionism—approaches now called "sub-symbolic" because they eschew early artificial intelligence (AI) research's emphasis on high level symbols. Historian and AI researcher Daniel Crevier writes: "time has proven the accuracy and perceptiveness of some of Dreyfus's comments." Dreyfus said in 2007 "I figure I won and it's over—they've given up."

In Mind Over Machine (1986), written during the heyday of expert systems, Dreyfus analyzed the difference between human expertise and the programs that claimed to capture it. This expanded on ideas from What Computers Can't Do, where he had made a similar argument criticizing the "cognitive simulation" school of AI research practiced by Allen Newell and Herbert A. Simon in the 1960s.

Dreyfus argued that human problem solving and expertise depend on our background sense of the context, of what is important and interesting given the situation, rather than on the process of searching through combinations of possibilities to find what we need. Dreyfus would describe it in 1986 as the difference between "knowing-that" and "knowing-how", based on Heidegger's distinction of present-at-hand and ready-to-hand.

Knowing-that is our conscious, step-by-step problem-solving abilities. We use these skills when we encounter a difficult problem that requires us to stop, step back and search through ideas one at a time. At moments like this, the ideas become very precise and simple: they become context-free symbols, which we manipulate using logic and language. These are the skills that Newell and Simon had demonstrated with both psychological experiments and computer programs. Dreyfus agreed that their programs adequately imitated the skills he calls "knowing-that".

Knowing-how, on the other hand, is the way we deal with things normally. We take actions without using conscious symbolic reasoning at all, as when we recognize a face, drive ourselves to work, or find the right thing to say. We seem to simply jump to the appropriate response, without considering any alternatives. This is the essence of expertise, Dreyfus argued: when our intuitions have been trained to the point that we forget the rules and simply "size up the situation" and react.

The human sense of the situation, according to Dreyfus, is based on our goals, our bodies, and our culture—all of our unconscious intuitions, attitudes, and knowledge about the world. This "context" or "background" (related to Heidegger's Dasein) is a form of knowledge that is not stored in our brains symbolically, but intuitively in some way. It affects what we notice and what we do not, what we expect, and what possibilities we do not consider: we discriminate between what is essential and inessential. The things that are inessential are relegated to our "fringe consciousness" (borrowing a phrase from William James): the millions of things we are aware of but are not really thinking about right now.

Dreyfus did not believe that AI programs, as they were implemented in the 1970s and 1980s, could capture this "background" or do the kind of fast problem solving that it allows. He argued that our unconscious knowledge could never be captured symbolically. If AI could not find a way to address these issues, then it was doomed to failure, an exercise in "tree climbing with one's eyes on the moon."

=== Examples of postcognitivist thinking ===
- Action-specific perception
- Activity theory
- Autopoiesis
- Direct realism
- Discursive psychology
- Distributed cognition
- Dynamicism
- Ecological psychology
- Embodied cognition
- Embodied embedded cognition
- Enactivism
- Group cognition
- Neurophenomenology
- Postcognitive psychology
- Situated cognition
