= Ghost Machine =

Ghost Machine may refer to:

- Ghost Machine (band), an American metal band
  - Ghost Machine (album), the self-titled debut album by the band
- Ghost Machine (film), a British mystery thriller released in 2009
- "Ghost Machine" (Torchwood), an episode of the British science fiction television series Torchwood
- Ghost Machine (company), an American comics publishing company

== See also ==
- Ghost in the machine (disambiguation)
