= Ghost in the Shell (disambiguation) =

Ghost in the Shell is a media franchise originally released as a manga by Masamune Shirow. It has since been adapted into animated films, animated television series, a live action film, prose, and video games with similar titles.

Ghost in the Shell may also refer to:

- Ghost in the Shell (manga), the manga by Masamune Shirow (including the original Ghost in the Shell, Ghost in the Shell 2 and Ghost in the Shell 1.5 produced from 1989 to 1997)

== Film and television ==
- Ghost in the Shell (1995 film), an animated film
- Ghost in the Shell 2: Innocence, a 2004 sequel to the 1995 film
- Ghost in the Shell: Stand Alone Complex, a 2002–2006 anime television series (two seasons)
- Ghost in the Shell: Stand Alone Complex – Solid State Society, a 2006 made-for-TV movie
- Ghost in the Shell: Arise, a 2013–2015 OVA and anime television series
- Ghost in the Shell: The New Movie, a 2015 animated film continuing from Arise
- Ghost in the Shell (2017 film), a live-action film starring Scarlett Johansson
- Ghost in the Shell: SAC 2045, a 2020–2022 Netflix anime series in Stand Alone Complex subcontiniuty (two seasons)
- The Ghost in the Shell (2026 TV series), a 2026 anime television series

== Video games ==
- Ghost in the Shell (video game), a 1997 PlayStation game
- Ghost in the Shell: Stand Alone Complex (2004 video game), for the PlayStation 2
- Ghost in the Shell: Stand Alone Complex (2005 video game), for the PlayStation Portable, sequel to the PS2 game
- Ghost in the Shell: Stand Alone Complex – First Assault Online, a 2015 first-person shooter video game

== See also ==
- Ghost in the Machine
