= Hildred Geertz =

American anthropologist (1927–2022)

Hildred Storey Geertz
- Born: Hildred Storey; February 12, 1927; New York City, U.S.
- Died: September 30, 2022 (aged 95); Princeton, New Jersey, U.S.
- Education: Antioch College (B.A.) Radcliffe College (Ph.D.)
- Spouse: Clifford Geertz (m. 1948; div. 1981)

Hildred Storey Geertz (February 12, 1927 – September 30, 2022) was an American anthropologist who studied Balinese and Javanese kinship practices and Balinese art in Indonesia.

Between 1960 and 1970, Geertz served as a research scholar, a lecturer, and an assistant professor of social anthropology at the University of Chicago. She began teaching in the Anthropology department at Princeton University in 1970, and was named professor emerita in 1998. Geertz was also the first female department chair at Princeton University. She was honored as one of the "People Who Have Made a Difference in the Lives of Women at Princeton" in 1998. She was also nominated as an outstanding anthropology educator by Marquis Who's Who in America.

== Major works ==
Geertz was born in New York City on February 12, 1927. She completed her B.A. and met her future husband, Clifford Geertz at Antioch College in Ohio. Geertz conducted her first fieldwork in Java with fellowship for her graduate school studies from 1952 to 1954. She received her Ph.D. in social anthropology from Radcliffe College in 1956 and published The Javanese Family in 1961. The book examines the structures and functions of the Javanese kinship system. She provides detailed ethnographic data to show how the most central unit: the nuclear family, stabilizes and sustains Javanese society.

Geertz conducted fieldwork in Bali for a year in 1957 where she continued her research of kinship systems. With her husband, she co-authored a book on the subject, Kinship in Bali (Chicago,1975). This book refutes the popular view by the time: an emphasis on autonomous characteristics of kinship. It argues that the kinship system should be examined as a subsystem that inherits particular cultural patterns, ideas, and symbols of the society.

Geertz later worked in Sefrou, Morocco, with Lawrence Rosen and Clifford Geertz to understand Moroccan family structure and the formation of their social ties. She was co-author with them of Meaning and Order in Moroccan Society: Three Essays in Cultural Analysis.

Geertz published Images of Power: Balinese Paintings Made for Gregory Bateson and Margaret Mead (1994) after conducting work on a painting series about the village of Batuan, where Margaret Mead and Gregory Bateson studied in the 1930s and collected these paintings originally for further studies. She critically suggests that these paintings, created by European artists living in Bali, reflect an "ethnography of Balinese imagination" (p. 1) and do not provide insight into the subject of Balinese characteristics.

== Personal life and death ==
Geertz married Clifford Geertz in 1948; they divorced in 1981. They had one son and one daughter.

Geertz died in Princeton, New Jersey on September 30, 2022, at the age of 95.

== Publications ==
- Geertz, Hildred (1968). "Latah in Java: A theoretical paradox". Ithaca: Indonesia No. 5. ISBN 0-87727-863-6 hdl:1813/53435
- Geertz, Hildred; Geertz, Clifford (1978). Kinship in Bali. Chicago: University of Chicago Press. ISBN 0-226-28516-2.
- Geertz, Hildred (1989). The Javanese Family: A Study of Kinship and Socialization. Illinois: Waveland Press. ISBN 978-0-88133-460-9, ISBN 0-88133-460-X.
- Geertz, Hildred (1991). State and Society in Bali: Historical Textual and Anthropological Approaches. Leiden: KITLV Press. ISBN 90-6718-031-9
- Geertz, Hildred (1994). Images of Power: Balinese Paintings Made for Gregory Bateson and Margaret Mead. Honolulu: University of Hawaii Press ISBN 0-8248-1679-X
- Geertz, Hildred Geertz; Togog, Ida Bagus Made (2005). Tales From a Charmed Life: A Balinese Painter Reminisces. Honolulu: University of Hawaii Press. ISBN 978-0-8248-2822-6
- Geertz, Hildred (2014). The Life of a Balinese Temple: Artistry, Imagination, and History in a Peasant Village. Honolulu: University of Hawaii Press. ISBN 978-0-8248-2533-1
- Geertz, Hildred (2017). Storytelling in Bali. Leiden: Boston Brill ISBN 978-90-04-31159-6.
