= A Postcognitive Negation =

2010 book by Matthew Giobbi

A Postcognitive Negation: The Sadomasochistic Dialectic of American Psychology
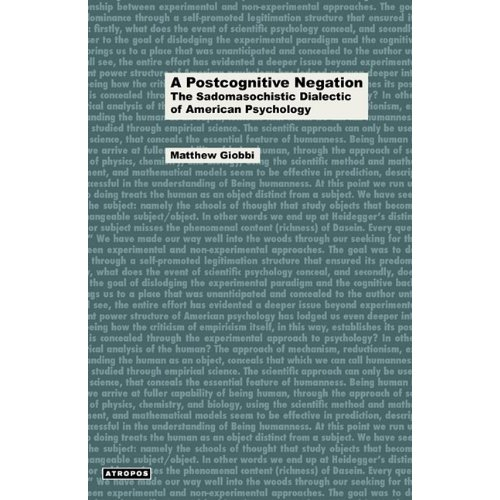
- Author: Matthew Giobbi
- Language: English
- Subject: Psychology
- Publisher: Atropos Press
- Publication date: 2010
- Publication place: Germany
- Pages: 380
- ISBN: 0982706766

A Postcognitive Negation: The Sadomasochistic Dialectic of American Psychology is a book written by Matthew Giobbi. It was published in 2010 by Atropos Press in New York City. The text was edited by Wolfgang Schirmacher.
