= Matthew Giobbi =

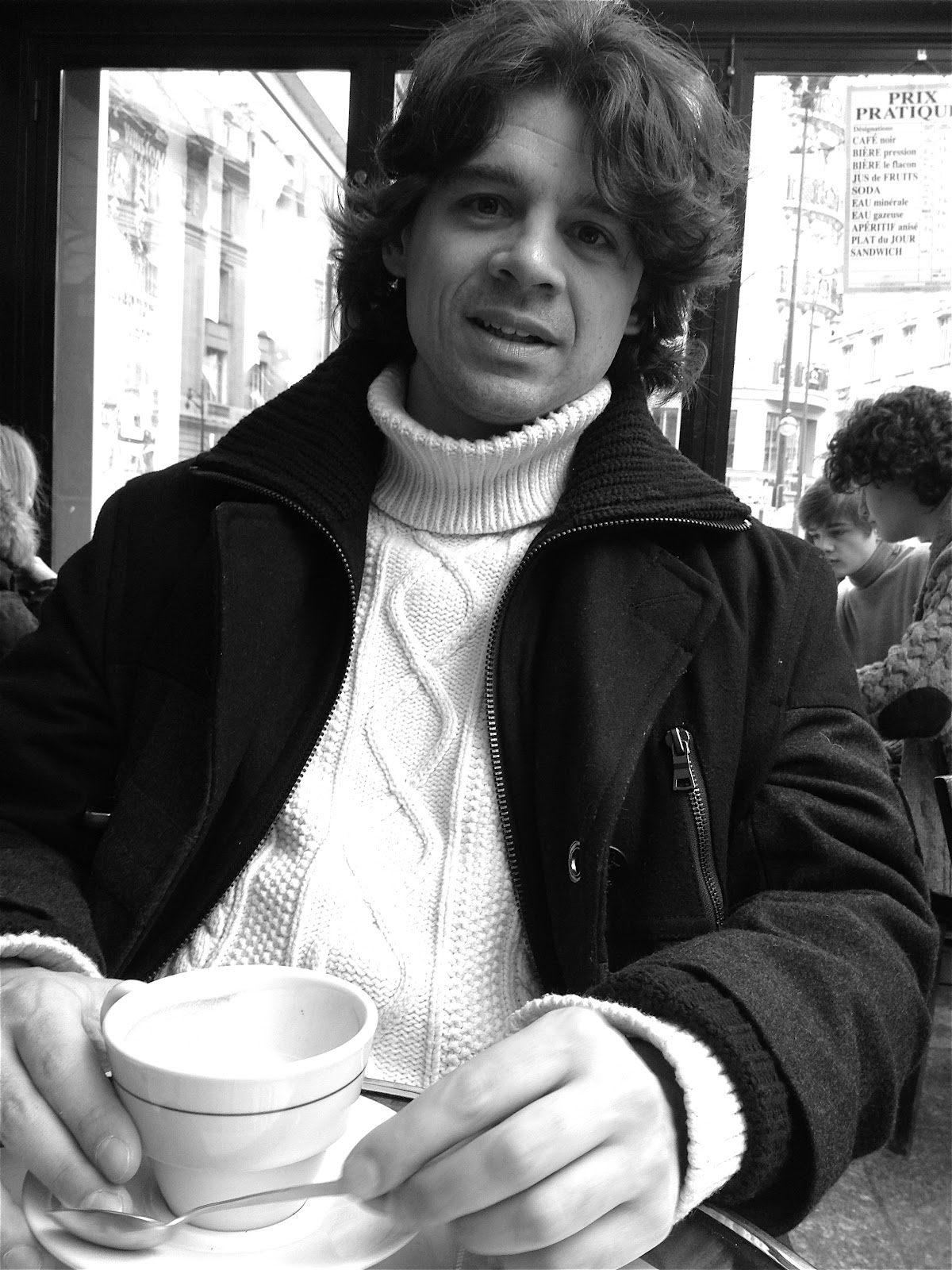
Giobbi in January 2012

Matthew Tyler Giobbi (born 1974) is an author and educator in the fields of music, science criticism, philosophy, media theory, psychoanalysis, and psychology. He has written A Postcognitive Negation: The Sadomasochistic Dialectic of American Psychology.

== Early life and education ==
Giobbi was born and raised in Easton, Pennsylvania. He began studying music with Paul Schocker, a pianist and composer.

He attended Moravian College in Bethlehem, Pennsylvania, where he studied trombone, and at Mannes School of Music. He performed with the New York Youth Symphony at Carnegie Hall, and was a trombonist with the Orquesta Filarmónica de Lima in Peru.

Giobbi studied trombone at Koninklijk Conservatorium, in Brussels. In 2005, Giobbi earned a master's degree in psychology from the Graduate Faculty at The New School for Social Research in New York City. In 2009, he earned a Ph.D. from the European Graduate School, under Wolfgang Schirmacher. Giobbi is founder of Muse & Psyche a performing and creative artist's psychology coaching and psychotherapy consulting service.

== Career ==
=== Academia ===
Giobbi designed the first undergraduate course in media psychology at Rutgers University at Newark. The course was added to the university's curriculum catalogue in 2015.

In 2014, he authored Media Psychology, published by Atropos Press. His private teaching focus is now on the application of existential-phenomenological psychology and Buddhist psychology in the practice of creative and performing arts.

== Music ==
=== Albums ===
In 1998, Giobbi released Collected Songs, which is a series of original songs, recorded in Brussels, Belgium. In 2018 he released an album of original compositions, Ode. Take on Me, an album of jazz-inspired music from the 1980s was released in 2021. In 2025, Giobbi wrote and recorded a contemporary piano album entitled Take My Time In 2025, Giobbi wrote and recorded a jazz album featuring trombone entitled Brussels Sketches

=== Singles ===
- Noelle (2021)
- Silent Night (2021)
- Good King Wenceslas (2021)
- Did You Mean to Tell Me, "I Love You"? (2021)
- Suddenly! (2021)
- Whatcha Gonna Do? (2021)
- Do Your Thing! (2021)
- Once Upon a Time in Brussels (2021)
- How to Love Again (2019)
- Lost in Savannah (2019)
- Learning How to Swim (2018)
- Believe in Me (2018)
- Ragazza Mia (1998)

== Books ==
- Musings: On Buddhist Psychology, Intellectual History, Psychodynamic Theory, Media Psychology, & Existential-Phenomenology. (Zürichsee Press, 2020). ISBN 979-8554962516.
- Inner Harmony: Personal Exploration at The Piano. (Zürichsee Press, 2017). ISBN 1546348840.
- Media Psychology. (Atropos Press, 2014). ISBN 194081393X.
- The Ego and the ID & Caesar and Me: An Introduction to the Text of Sigmund Freud Through The Twilight Zone. (Zürichsee Press, 2015). ISBN 1508591075.
- An "A" Effort: The College Student's Guide to Success. (Tribeca Press, 2011). ISBN 149524038X.
- A Postcognitive Negation: The Sadomasochistic Dialectic of American Psychology. (Atropos Press, 2010). ASIN: B014IC6Z72.
