= Clifford Geertz =

American anthropologist (1926–2006)

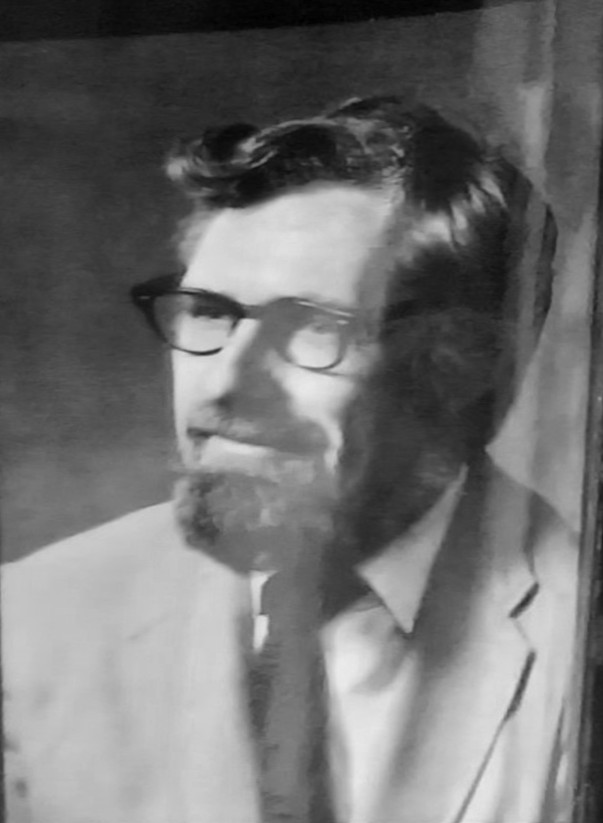
- Geertz c. 1973
- Born: August 23, 1926; San Francisco, California, U.S.
- Died: October 30, 2006 (aged 80); Philadelphia, Pennsylvania, U.S.
- Known for: Thick description Epochalism
- Spouse: Hildred Geertz (m. 1948; div. 1981)

Academic background
- Education: Antioch College (BA); Harvard University (PhD)
- Thesis: Religion in Modjokuto: A Study of Ritual Belief In A Complex Society (1956)
- Doctoral advisor: Talcott Parsons
- Influences: Talcott Parsons, Gilbert Ryle, Ludwig Wittgenstein, Max Weber, Paul Ricoeur, Alfred Schütz, Susanne Langer

Academic work
- Discipline: Anthropology
- School or tradition: Symbolic anthropology, Interpretive anthropology
- Institutions: University of Chicago; Institute for Advanced Study, Princeton, New Jersey
- Doctoral students: Lawrence Rosen, Sherry Ortner, Paul Rabinow
- Influenced: Stephen Greenblatt, Quentin Skinner

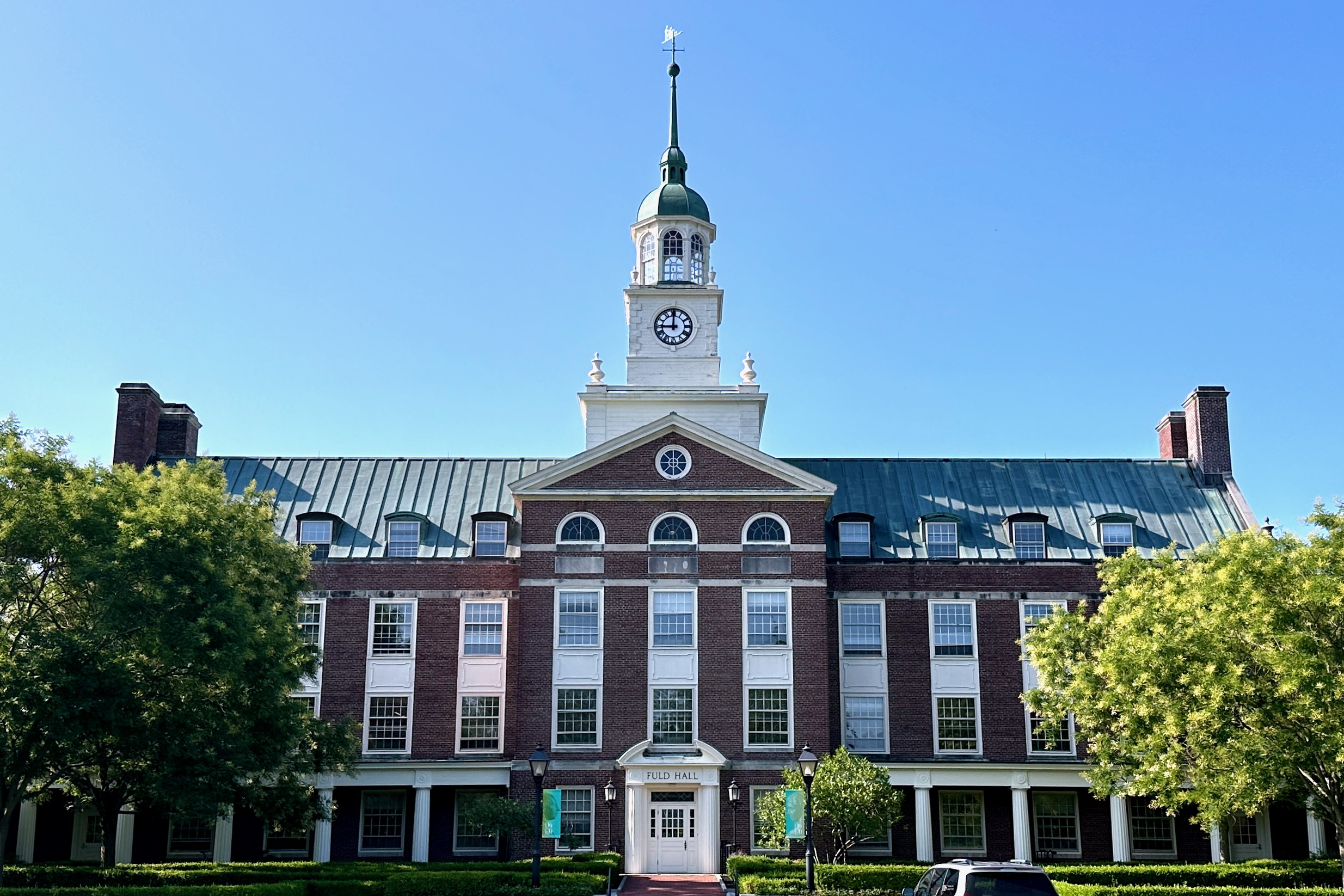
Institute for Advanced Study in Princeton, New Jersey

Clifford James Geertz (/ɡɜːrts/; August 23, 1926 – October 30, 2006) was an American anthropologist who was known for his influence on the practice of symbolic anthropology and who was considered "for three decades ... the single most influential cultural anthropologist in the United States." He served until his death as professor emeritus at the Institute for Advanced Study, Princeton.

== Life and career ==
Born in San Francisco on August 23, 1926, Geertz served in the US Navy in World War II from 1943 to 1945. He received a bachelor of arts in philosophy from Antioch College at Yellow Springs, Ohio in 1950 and a doctor of philosophy in anthropology from Harvard University in 1956.

At Harvard University he studied in the Department of Social Relations with an interdisciplinary program led by Talcott Parsons. Geertz worked with Parsons, as well as with Clyde Kluckhohn, and was trained as an anthropologist. Geertz conducted his first long-term fieldwork together with his wife, Hildred, in Java, Indonesia, in a project funded by the Ford Foundation and the Massachusetts Institute of Technology. There he studied the religious life of the small, upcountry town of Mojokuto for two-and-a-half years (1952 to 1954), living with a railroad laborer's family. After finishing his thesis, Geertz returned to Indonesia, visiting Bali and Sumatra, after which he would receive his PhD in 1956 with a dissertation entitled Religion in Modjokuto: A Study of Ritual Belief In A Complex Society.

In the course of his career, Geertz received honorary doctorate degrees from around fifteen colleges and universities, including Harvard, Cambridge, and the University of Chicago; as well as awards such as the Association for Asian Studies' (AAS) 1987 Award for Distinguished Contributions to Asian Studies. He became a member of the American Academy of Arts and Sciences, of the American Philosophical Society, and of the United States National Academy of Sciences. Following his divorce from anthropologist Hildred Geertz, his first wife, he married Karen Blu, another anthropologist.

=== Teaching ===
Geertz taught or held fellowships at a number of schools before joining the faculty of the anthropology department at the University of Chicago in 1960. In this period he expanded his focus on Indonesia to include both Java and Bali and produced three books, including Religion of Java (1960), Agricultural Involution (1963), and Peddlers and Princes (also 1963). In the mid-1960s, he shifted course and began a new research project in Morocco that resulted in several publications, including Islam Observed (1968), which compared Indonesia and Morocco.

In 1970, Geertz left Chicago to become professor of social science at the Institute for Advanced Study in Princeton, New Jersey, from 1970 to 2000, and subsequently as emeritus professor. In 1973 he published The Interpretation of Cultures, which collected essays he had published throughout the 1960s. That became Geertz's best-known book and established him not just as an Indonesianist but also as an anthropological theorist. In 1974, he edited the anthology Myth, Symbol, Culture that contained papers by many important anthropologists on symbolic anthropology. Geertz produced ethnographic pieces in this period, such as Kinship in Bali (1975), Meaning and Order in Moroccan Society (1978; written collaboratively with Hildred Geertz and Lawrence Rosen) and Negara (1981).

=== Later life ===
From the 1980s to his death, Geertz wrote more theoretical and essayistic pieces, including book reviews for the New York Review of Books. As a result, most of his books of the period are collections of essays—books including Local Knowledge (1983), Available Light (2000), and Life Among The Anthros (2010), which was published posthumously. He also produced a series of short essays on the stylistics of ethnography in Works and Lives (1988), while other works include the autobiographical After The Fact (1995).

Geertz conducted extensive ethnographic research in Southeast Asia and North Africa. This fieldwork was the basis of Geertz's famous analysis of the Balinese cockfight among others. While holding a position in Chicago in the 1960s, he directed a multidisciplinary project titled Committee for the Comparative Studies of New Nations. As part of the project, Geertz conducted fieldwork in Morocco on "bazaars, mosques, olive growing and oral poetry," collecting ethnographic data that would be used for his famous essay on thick description.

Geertz contributed to social and cultural theory and remains influential in turning anthropology toward a concern with the frames of meaning within which various peoples live their lives. He reflected on the basic core notions of anthropology, such as culture and ethnography.

He died of complications following heart surgery on October 30, 2006. At the time of his death, Geertz was working on the general question of ethnic diversity and its implications in the modern world. He was remembered by the New York Times as "the eminent cultural anthropologist whose work focused on interpreting the symbols he believed give meaning and order to people’s lives."

== Main ideas, contributions, and influences ==
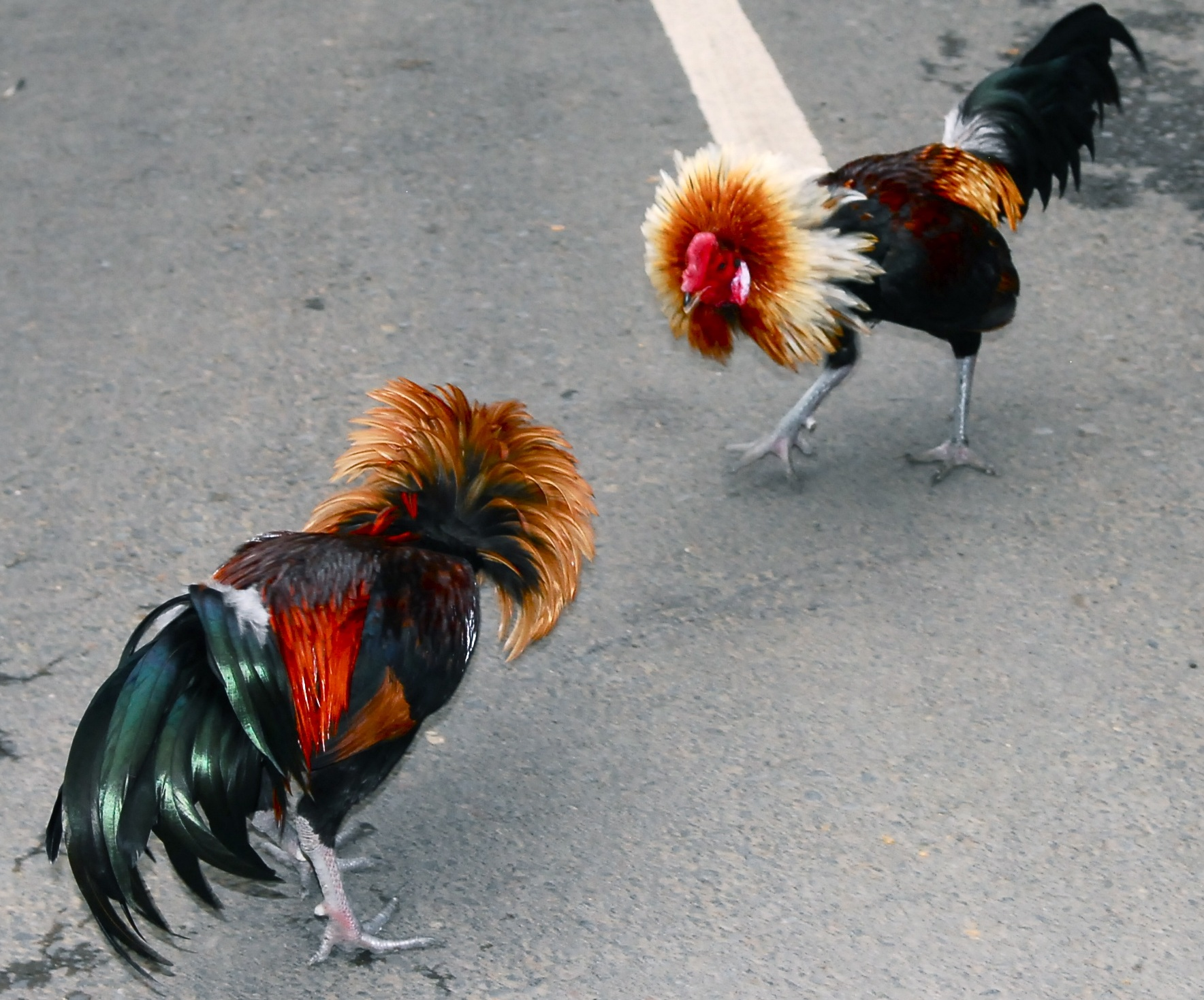
Cockfight in Bali

Geertz's often-cited essay "Deep Play: Notes on the Balinese Cockfight" is a classic example of thick description, a concept adopted from the British philosopher Gilbert Ryle which comes from ordinary language philosophy. Thick description is an anthropological method of explaining with as much detail as possible the reason behind human actions. Many human actions can mean many different things, and Geertz insisted that the anthropologist needs to be aware of this. The work proved influential amongst historians, many of whom tried to use these ideas about the "meaning" of cultural practice in the study of customs and traditions of the past.

Another of Geertz's philosophical influences is that of Ludwig Wittgenstein's post-Tractatus philosophy, from which Geertz incorporates the concept of family resemblances into anthropology. Geertz would also introduce anthropology to the "umwelt-mitwelt-vorwelt-folgewelt" formulation of Alfred Schütz's phenomenology, stressing that the links between the "consociate", "contemporary", "predecessor", and "successor" that are commonplace in anthropology derive from this very formulation.

At the University of Chicago, Geertz became a champion of symbolic anthropology, a framework which gives prime attention to the role of symbols in constructing public meaning. In his seminal work The Interpretation of Cultures (1973), Geertz outlined culture as "a system of inherited conceptions expressed in symbolic forms by means of which men communicate, perpetuate, and develop their knowledge about and attitudes toward life."

He was one of the earliest scholars to see that the insights provided by common language, philosophy and literary analysis could have major explanatory force in the social sciences. Geertz aimed to provide the social sciences with an understanding and appreciation of “thick description.” Geertz applied thick description to anthropological studies, particularly to his own "interpretive anthropology", urging anthropologists to consider the limitations placed upon them by their own cultural cosmologies when attempting to offer insight into the cultures of other people. He produced theory that had implications for other social sciences; for example, Geertz asserted that culture was essentially semiotic in nature, and this theory has implications for comparative political sciences.

Max Weber and his interpretative social science are strongly present in Geertz's work. Drawing from Weber, Geertz himself argues for a “semiotic” concept of culture:

Believing ... that man is an animal suspended in webs of significance he himself has spun ... I take culture to be those webs, and the analysis of it to be therefore not an experimental science in search of law but an interpretative one in search of meaning. It is explication I am after, construing social expression on their surface enigmatical. (p. 5)

Geertz argues that to interpret a culture's web of symbols, scholars must first isolate its elements, specifying the internal relationships among those elements and characterize the whole system in some general way according to the core symbols around which it is organized, the underlying structures of which it is a surface expression, or the ideological principles upon which it is based. It was his view that culture is public, because “meaning is,” and systems of meanings are what produce culture, because they are the collective property of a particular people. We cannot discover the culture's import or understand its systems of meaning, when, as Wittgenstein noted, “we cannot find our feet with them.” Geertz wants society to appreciate that social actions are larger than themselves:

It is not against a body of uninterrupted data, radically thinned descriptions, that we must measure the cogency of our explications, but against the power of the scientific imagination to bring us into touch with the lives of strangers. (p. 18)

Seeking to converse with subjects in foreign cultures and gain access to their conceptual world is the goal of the approach to culture. Cultural theory is not its own master, that the generality “thick description” contrives to achieve, grows out of the delicacy of its distinctions, not the sweep of its abstraction. The aim of theory-building in this context is not to codify abstract regularities, but to enable detailed (“thick”) description. Rather than seeking to generalize across cases, it focuses on developing insights within individual cases.

During Geertz's long career he worked through a variety of theoretical phases and schools of thought. He would reflect an early leaning toward functionalism in his essay "Ethos, Worldview and the Analysis of Sacred Symbols", writing that "the drive to make sense out of experience, to give it form and order, is evidently as real and pressing as the more familiar biological needs."

== Legacy ==
Geertz's research and ideas have had a strong influence on 20th-century academia, including modern anthropology and communication studies, as well as for geographers, ecologists, political scientists, scholars of religion, historians, and other humanists.

University of Miami Professor Daniel Pals (1996) wrote of Geertz that "his critics are few; his admirers legion." Talal Asad, however, attacked the dualism in Geertzian theory: the theory does not provide a bridge between external symbols and internal dispositions. Asad also pointed out the need for a more nuanced approach toward the historical background of certain concepts. Criticizing Geertz's theory of religion in general, Asad pointed out a gap between "cultural system" and "social reality" when attempting to define the concept of religion in universal terms. He would also criticize Geertz for ascribing an authorizing discourse around conversations of comparative religion that, Asad argues, does not really exist. Furthermore, Asad criticized Geertz for operating according to a eurocentric view of religion that places import on signs and symbols that may or may not carry through in non-Christian religious cultures.

== Interlocutors ==
- Stephen Greenblatt
- Robert Darnton
- Mark R. Woodward
- Talal Asad

== Publications ==
=== Bibliography of major works ===
- 1960. The Religion of Java. Chicago: University Of Chicago Press (1976, revised ed.). ISBN 9780226285108.
- 1963. Peddlers and Princes: Social Development and Economic Change in Two Indonesian Towns. Chicago: University Of Chicago Press. LCCN 63-18844.
- 1964. Agricultural Involution: the process of ecological change in Indonesia. Berkeley: University of California Press.
- 1966. "Religion as a Cultural System." Pp. 1–46 in Anthropological Approaches to the Study of Religion, edited by M. Banton. ASA Monographs 3. London: Tavistock Publications.
- 1968. Islam Observed, Religious Development in Morocco and Indonesia. Chicago: University Of Chicago Press (1971). ISBN 0-226-28511-1.
- 1973. The Interpretation of Cultures. New York: Basic Books (2000). ISBN 0-465-09719-7.
- 1975. Kinship in Bali, coauthored by H. Geertz. Chicago: University Of Chicago Press (1978), paperback: ISBN 0-226-28516-2
- 1980. Negara: The Theatre State in Nineteenth Century Bali. Princeton, NJ: Princeton University Press. ISBN 9780691007786.
- 1983. Local Knowledge: Further Essays in Interpretive Anthropology. Basic Books (2008). ISBN 9780786723751.
- 1984. "Anti Anti-Relativism." American Anthropologist 86(2):263–278.
- 1988. Works and Lives: The Anthropologist As Author. Stanford: Stanford University Press (1990), paperback: ISBN 0-8047-1747-8.
- 1995. After the Fact: Two Countries, Four Decades, One Anthropologist. Boston: Harvard University Press (1996, revised ed.). ISBN 9780674008724.
- 2000. Available Light: Anthropological Reflections on Philosophical Topics. Princeton, NJ: Princeton University Press. ISBN 9780691049748
- 2002. "An inconstant profession: The anthropological life in interesting times." Annual Review of Anthropology 31: 1–19. Viewable at hypergeertz.jku.at

=== Complete bibliography ===
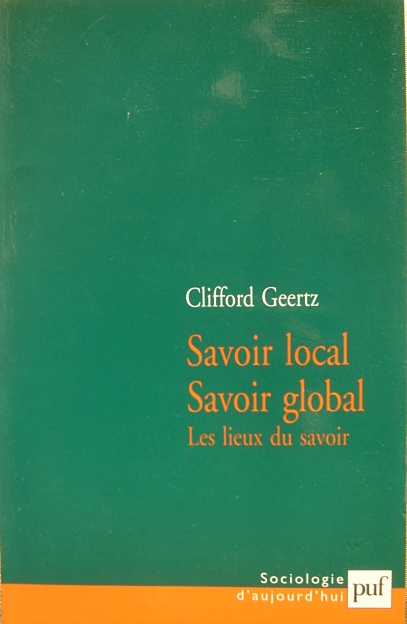
French Edition of Geertz' "Local Knowledge"

- 1957. "Ethos, world-view and the analysis of sacred symbols." The Antioch Review, 17(4), 421–437. doi:10.2307/4609997
- 1957. "Ritual and Social Change: A Javanese Example." American Anthropologist 59(1):32–54.
- 1959. "Form and Variation in Balinese Village Structure." American Anthropologist 61:991–1012.
- 1959 "The Javanese Village." Pp. 34–41 in Local, Ethnic, and National Loyalties in Village Indonesia, edited by G. W. Skinner. New Haven: Southeast Asian Program, Yale University.
- 1960. Religion of Java. Glencoe, IL: Free Press.
- 1961. "The Rotating Credit Association: A 'Middle Rung' in Development." Economic Development and Cultural Change 10:241–263.
- 1962. "Studies in Peasant Life: Community and Society." Biennial Review of Anthropology 1961, edited by B. J. Siegal. pp. 1–41. Stanford: Stanford University Press.
- 1962. "The Growth of Culture and the Evolution of Mind." Pp. 713–740 in Theories of the Mind, edited by J. Scher. New York: Free Press.
- 1963. Agricultural Involution: The Process of Agricultural Change in Indonesia. Berkeley: University of California Press.
- 1963. Peddlers and Princes: Social Change and Economic Modernization in Two Indonesian Towns. Chicago: University of Chicago Press.
- 1963. (as editor) Old Societies and New States: The Quest for Modernity in Asia and Africa. New York: Free Press.
- 1963. "The Integrative Revolution: Primordial Sentiments and Civil Politics in the New States." Pp. 105–157 in Old Societies and New States, ed. C. Geertz. Glencoe, IL: Free Press.
- 1964. "Ideology as a Cultural System." Pp. 47–76 in Ideology and Discontent, edited by D. Apter. New York: Free Press.
- 1965. The Social History of an Indonesian Town. Cambridge: MIT Press.
- 1965. Modernization in a Muslim Society: The Indonesian Case. Pp. 20157 11 in Man, State, and Society in Contemporary South East Asia, edited by R. O. Tilman (ed). London: Pall Mall.
- 1966. "Person, Time, and Conduct in Bali: An Essay in Cultural Analysis." Southeast Asia Program, Cultural Report Series. New Haven: Yale University.
- 1966. "Religion as a Cultural System." Pp. 1–46 in Anthropological Approaches to the Study of Religion, edited by Michael Banton. ASA Monographs 3. London: Tavistock Publications.
- 1966. "The Impact of the Concept of Culture on the Concept of Man." Pp. 93–118 in New Views of the Nature of Man, edited by J. Platt. Chicago: University of Chicago Press.
- 1967. "Politics Past, Politics Preset: Some Notes on the Contribution of Anthropology to the Study of the New States." European Journal of Sociology 8(1):1–14.
- 1967. "The Cerebral Savage: On the Work of Claude Lévi-Strauss." Encounter 48(4):25–32.
- 1967. "Tihingan: A Balinese Village." pp. 210–43 in Villages in Indonesia, edited by R. N. Koentjaraningrat. Ithaca: Cornell University Press.
- 1967. "Under the Mosquito Net." New York Review of Books September 14.
- 1968. Islam Observed: Religious Development in Morocco and Indonesia. Chicago: University of Chicago Press. 136 pp.
- 1968. "Thinking as a Moral Act: Dimensions of Anthropological Fieldwork in the New States." Antioch Review 28(2):139–158.
- 1971. (as editor) Myth, Symbol, and Culture. NY: W.W. Norton and Company, Inc.
- 1972. "Religious Change and Social Order in Soeharto's Indonesia." Asia 27:62–84.
- 1972. "The Wet and the Dry: Traditional Irrigation in Bali and Morocco." Human Ecology 1:34–39.
- 1972. "Deep Play: Notes on the Balinese Cockfight." Daedalus 101(1).
- 1973. The Interpretation of Cultures: Selected Essays. New York: Basic Books.
  - 1973. "Thick Description: Toward an Interpretive Theory of Culture." Pp. 3–30 in The Interpretation of Cultures.
- 1976. "From the Native's Point of View." Pp. 221–237 in Meaning in Anthropology, edited by K. H. Basso and H. A. Selby. Albuquerque: University of New Mexico Press.
- 1977. "Found in Translation: On the Social History of the Moral Imagination." Georgia Review 31(4):788–810.
- 1977. "Curing, Sorcery, and Magic in a Javanese Town." Pp. 146–153 in Culture, Disease, and Healing: Studies in Medical Anthropology, edited by D. Landy. New York: Macmillan Publishing.
- 1979. Meaning and Order in Moroccan Society: Three Essays in Cultural Analysis, written with H. Geertz and L. Rosen. Cambridge: Cambridge University Press. See his own contribution on "Suq: The Bazaar Economy in Sefrou" (Pp. 123–225).
- 1980. Negara: The Theatre State in Nineteenth-Century Bali. Princeton: Princeton University Press.
- 1980. "Organization of the Balinese Subak". pp. 70–90 in Irrigation and Agricultural Development in Asia: Perspectives from the Social Sciences, edited by E.W. Coward. New York: Cornell University Press.
- 1983. Local Knowledge: Further Essays in Interpretive Anthropology. New York: Basic Books.
  - "Centers, Kings, and Charisma: Reflections on the Symbolics of Power." Pp. 121–146 in Local Knowledge.
  - "From the Native's Point of View: On the Nature of Anthropological Knowledge." pp. 55–70.In: Local Knowledge.
- 1983. "Notions of Primitive Thought: Dialogue with Clifford Geertz." Pp. 192–210 in States of Mind, edited & composed by J. Miller. New York: Pantheon.
- 1984. "Anti Anti-Relativism: 1983 Distinguished Lecture." American Anthropologist 82:263–278.
- 1984. "Culture and Social Change: The Indonesian Case." Man 19:511–532.
- 1986. Pp. 251–75 in The Uses of Diversity. In: Tanner Lectures on Human Values, Vol. 7, edited by S. M. McMurrin. Cambridge: Cambridge University Press & University of Utah Press.
- 1988. Works and Lives: The Anthropologist as Author. Stanford: Stanford University Press. Includes the following studies:
  - "The World in a Text: How to Read Tristes Tropiques" (pp. 25–48).
  - "Slide Show: Evans-Pritchard's African Transparencies" (pp. 49–72).
  - "I-Witnessing: Malinowski's Children" (pp. 73–101).
  - "Us/not-Us: Benedict's Travels" (pp. 102–128).
- 1989. "Margaret Mead, 1901–1978." Biographical Memoirs of the National Academy of Sciences 58:329–341.
- 1990. "History and Anthropology." New Literary History 21(2):321–335.
- 1991. "The Year of Living Culturally." New Republic (October 21):30–36.
- 1992. "'Local Knowledge' and Its Limits: Some Obiter Dicta." Yale Journal of Criticism 5(2):129–135.
- 1993. "'Ethnic Conflict': Three Alternative Terms." Common Knowledge 2(3):54–65.
- 1994. "Life on the Edge" [review of Tsing 1993, In the Realm of the Diamond Queen]. New York Review of Books 41(7 April ):3–4.
- 1995. After the Fact: Two Countries, Four Decades, One Anthropologist, The Jerusalem-Harvard Lectures. Cambridge: Harvard University Press.
- 1995. "Culture War" [review essay of Sahlins 1995, "How 'Natives' Think and Obeyesekere, The Apotheosis of Captain Cook"]. New York Review of Books 42(19 November 30): 4–6.
- 1999 "'The pinch of destiny': Religion as Experience, Meaning, Identity, Power." Raritan 18(3 Winter): 1–19.
- 2000. Available Light: Anthropological Reflections on Philosophical Topics. Princeton: Princeton University Press.
- 2010. Life Among the Anthros and Other Essays, edited by F. Inglis. Princeton: Princeton University Press.

== See also ==
- Clifford Geertz's theory of religion
- Thick Description
- Deep Play: Notes on the Balinese Cockfight
- List of important publications in anthropology
