= The Concept of Mind =

1949 book by Gilbert Ryle

- Cover of the first edition
- Author: Gilbert Ryle
- Language: English
- Subject: Philosophy of mind
- Publisher: University of Chicago Press
- Publication date: Original 1949; current edition 2002
- Publication place: United Kingdom
- Media type: Print (hardback and paperback)
- Pages: 334
- ISBN: 0-226-73295-9
- OCLC: 10229750
- Dewey Decimal: 128/.2 19
- LC Class: BF161 .R9 1984

The Concept of Mind is a 1949 book by philosopher Gilbert Ryle, in which the author argues that "mind" is "a philosophical illusion hailing chiefly from René Descartes and sustained by logical errors and 'category mistakes' which have become habitual."

The work has been cited as having "put the final nail in the coffin of Cartesian dualism," and has been seen as a founding document in the philosophy of mind, which received professional recognition as a distinct and important branch of philosophy only after 1950.

In 2002, it was republished with an introduction by Daniel Dennett.

== Ghost in the machine ==
In the chapter "Descartes' Myth", Ryle introduces "the dogma of the Ghost in the machine" to describe the philosophical concept of the mind as an entity separate from the body:

I hope to prove that it is entirely false, and false not in detail but in principle. It is not merely an assemblage of particular mistakes. It is one big mistake and a mistake of a special kind. It is, namely, a category-mistake.

== Critique of Cartesian dualism ==
Ryle rejects Descartes' theory of the relation between mind and body, on the grounds that it approaches the investigation of mental processes as if they could be isolated from physical processes. In order to demonstrate how this theory may be misleading, he explains that knowing how to perform an act skillfully may not only be a matter of being able to reason practically but may also be a matter of being able to put practical reasoning into action. Practical actions may not necessarily be produced by highly theoretical reasoning or by complex sequences of intellectual operations. The meaning of actions may not be explained by making inferences about hidden mental processes, but it may be explained by examining the rules that govern those actions.

According to Ryle, mental processes are merely intelligent acts. There are no mental processes that are distinct from intelligent acts. The operations of the mind are not merely represented by intelligent acts, they are the same as those intelligent acts. Thus, acts of learning, remembering, imagining, knowing, or willing are not merely clues to hidden mental processes or to complex sequences of intellectual operations, they are the way in which those mental processes or intellectual operations are defined. Logical propositions are not merely clues to modes of reasoning, they are those modes of reasoning.

The rationalist theory that there is a transformation into physical acts of some purely mental faculty of "Will" or "Volition" is therefore a misconception because it mistakenly assumes that a mental act could be and is distinct from a physical act, or even that a mental world could be and is distinct from the physical world. This theory of the separability of mind and body is described by Ryle as "the dogma of the ghost in the machine." He explains that the workings of the mind as it governs the body are neither an independent nor a distinct mechanism, that there is no entity called "Mind" inside a mechanical apparatus called "the body", but that the workings of the mind may be better conceptualized as the actions of the body.

Cartesian theory holds that mental acts determine physical acts and that volitional acts of the body must be caused by volitional acts of the mind. This theory, according to Ryle, is "the myth of the ghost in the machine."

There is no contradiction between saying that an action is governed by physical laws and saying that the same action is governed by principles of reasoning. The motives of observable actions are propensities and dispositions; these explain why behaviors occur, and not some purely mental process. For example, the disposition to want or not to want something is not explained by an intellectual motive for that thing. The disposition to want something is explained by the behaviors that are involved in wanting that thing. Thus, the mind does consist of abilities and dispositions that do explain behaviors, for example the learning, remembering, knowing, feeling, or willing behaviors. However, personal abilities and dispositions are not the same as mental processes or events. To refer to abilities or dispositions as if they were purely mental occurrences is to make a basic kind of category mistake.

The nature of a person's motives may be defined by the actions and reactions of that person in various circumstances or situations. The nature of a person's motives in a particular situation may not necessarily be determined by any hidden mental processes or intellectual acts within that person. Motives may be revealed or explained by a person's behavior in a situation.

Ryle criticizes the theory that the mind is a place where mental images are apprehended, perceived, or remembered. Sensations, thoughts, and feelings do not belong to a mental world which is distinct from the physical world. Knowledge, memory, imagination, and other abilities or dispositions do not reside "within" the mind as if the mind were a space in which these dispositions could be placed or located. Furthermore, dispositions are not the same as behavioral actions, but actions may be explained by dispositions.

Dispositions are neither visible nor hidden, because they are not in the same logical category as behavioral actions. Dispositions are not mental processes or intellectual acts, they are propensities which explain various modes of behavior. Perceptions, thoughts, emotions, and feelings may be understood as observable behaviors which have various modes of production.

Ryle admits that his approach to the theory of mind is behavioristic in being opposed to the theory that there are hidden mental processes that are distinct from observable behaviors. His approach is based on the view that actions such as thinking, remembering, feeling, and willing are revealed by modes of behavior or by dispositions to modes of behavior. At the same time, however, he criticizes both Cartesian theory and behaviorist theory for being overly mechanistic. While Cartesian theory may insist that hidden mental events produce the behavioral responses of the conscious individual, behaviorism may insist that stimulus-response mechanisms produce the behavioral responses of the conscious individual. Ryle concludes that both Cartesian theory and behaviorist theory may be too rigid and mechanistic to provide us with an adequate understanding of the concept of mind.

== Category mistakes ==
As a linguistic philosopher, a significant portion of Ryle's argument is devoted to analyzing what he perceives as philosophical errors based in conceptual use of language. His critique of Cartesian dualism refers to it as a category mistake. Category mistakes, such as the ones Ryle points out, are made by people who do not know how to properly wield the concepts with which they are working. Their puzzles arise from the inability to use certain items in human language. A much-cited example is of a foreign visitor being shown round Oxford (which has no campus) and after having been shown colleges, libraries, laboratories and playing fields asks in puzzlement "But where is the university?" The answer is, of course, all of these.

The theoretically interesting category mistakes are those made by people who are perfectly competent to apply concepts, at least in the situations with which they are familiar, but are still liable in their abstract thinking to relocate those concepts to logical types to which they do not belong.

The dualist doctrine establishes a polar opposition between mind and body. At the language level, the mental properties are logical negations (in the Aristotelian sense) of the physical properties. So they belong, in accordance with the concept of category, to the same logical types, given that the expressions that are used for the descriptions of mental events are always mere negatives of the expressions used for the descriptions of material events. Ryle then says that such use implies a 'categorical mistake' for the descriptions of mental events that do not properly belong to the categories used for describing the corporeal events. Hence, 'mind' and 'matter' cannot be the polar opposites that Dualism suggests. Ryle writes that this would be comparable to claiming that "She came home in floods of tears" and "She came home in a sedan chair" (from the sentence "Miss Bolo came home in a flood of tears and a sedan chair," a zeugmatic sentence from Dickens) to be polar opposites. Such mistakes are, from the Rylean standpoint, the dogma of the mental ghost in the corporeal machine. Then, dualist doctrines are mythic in an analytical sense.

== Antecedents ==
Ryle builds on the work of philosophers Ludwig Wittgenstein and Arthur Schopenhauer, among others. According to Bryan Magee, the central thesis of Concept of Mind and the essentials of its subsidiary theses were derived from Schopenhauer, whose works Ryle had read as a student, then largely forgotten. Ryle, who believed that he had expounded an original theory, did not realize what he had done until someone pointed it out to him after the book was published.

== Reception ==
Ryle has been characterized as an "ordinary language" philosopher, for which the book's philosophical framework has attracted comment. According to G.J. Warnock, the book's importance derives not only from the subject matter, but also from the fact that "it was one of the first, and hence has been one of the most widely influential, attacks in the new style upon an old family of problems". P.F. Strawson considered the book as among "some of the most successful work of the period". Ryle himself stated that his purpose in writing the book was to show how the new method could be used to successfully tackle age-old philosophical problems:

By the latter 1940s it was time, I thought, to exhibit a sustained piece of analytical hatchet-work being directed upon some notorious and large-sized Gordian Knot. After a long spell of enlightened methodological talk, what was needed now was an example of the method really working, in breadth and depth and where it was really needed.

It was therefore, as Ryle put it, "a philosophical book written with a meta-philosophical purpose.

Stuart Hampshire remarked in a review in Mind that:

There is only one property which I can discover to be common to Professor Ryle and Immanuel Kant; in both cases the style is the philosopher - as Kant thought and wrote in dichotomies, Professor Ryle writes in epigrams. There are many passages in which the argument simply consists of a succession of epigrams, which do indeed effectively explode on impact, shattering conventional trains of thought, but which, like most epigrams, leave behind among the debris in the reader's mind a trail of timid doubts and qualifications.

John Searle, who has often said that no great work of philosophy contains many footnotes and that philosophical quality varies inversely with the number of bibliographical references, considers the absence of footnotes in The Concept of Mind as a sign of its quality.

Iris Murdoch has compared The Concept of Mind to Jean-Paul Sartre's Being and Nothingness (1943), with the view that English analytic philosophy shares the same general orientation as continental philosophy. Ryle has been interpreted by David Stannard as maintaining that the psychoanalytic idea of the unconscious is rooted in the Cartesian conception of a body-mind dichotomy and as such is one version of the "Ghost in the Machine" fallacy. According to Stannard, Ryle views the dogma as a logical error based on a category mistake.

Richard Webster praises Ryle's clarity and strength of argument, but suggests that while his arguments effectively dissolve the mind-body problem, they have failed to bring about a revolution in human knowledge. Webster attributes this to the fact that Ryle's case that subjective aspects of experience such as sensation, memory, consciousness and sense of self are not the essence of "mind" has not been universally accepted by contemporary philosophers, neuroscientists, and psychologists. Webster believes that Ryle's willingness to accept the characterization of The Concept of Mind as behaviorist misrepresents its more nuanced position, writing that Ryle's acceptance of that description is not harmless, as Ryle himself suggested. Webster stresses that Ryle does not deny the reality of what are often called internal sensations and thoughts, but simply rejects the idea that they belong to a realm logically distinct from and independent of the external realm of ordinary human behaviour.

The book's style of writing was commented on more negatively by Herbert Marcuse, who observes that the way in which Ryle follows his presentation of "Descartes' Myth" as the "official doctrine" about the relation between body and mind with a preliminary demonstration of its "absurdity" which evokes "John Doe, Richard Roe, and what they think about the 'Average Taxpayer'" shows a style that moves "between the two poles of pontificating authority and easy-going chumminess," something Marcuse finds to be characteristic of philosophical behaviorism.

== See also ==
- Hard problem of consciousness
- Logical behaviorism
- Mens sana in corpore sano
- Qualia
