= Lawrence Rosen (anthropologist) =

American anthropologist (born 1941)

- Born: Lawrence Rosen; 1941 (age 84–85); United States
- Education: Brandeis University (B.A.); University of Chicago (Ph.D.); University of Chicago (J.D.)
- Awards: MacArthur Fellowship (1981); Lewis Henry Morgan Lecture (1985)
- Scientific career
- Fields: Cultural Anthropology, Legal Anthropology
- Workplaces: Princeton University
- Doctoral advisor: Clifford Geertz

Lawrence Rosen (born 1941) is an American anthropologist and scholar of law. He is the William Nelson Cromwell Professor of Anthropology at Princeton University and adjunct professor of law at Columbia University.

Rosen earned his B.A. at Brandeis University in 1963, his Ph.D. in anthropology from the University of Chicago in 1968, and his J.D. from the University of Chicago in 1974. In 1981 he became one of the first generation of MacArthur Fellows.

== Books ==
- Meaning and Order in Moroccan Society: Three Essays in Cultural Analysis. (with Clifford Geertz and Hildred Geertz). Cambridge: Cambridge University Press, 1979
- Bargaining for Reality: The Construction of Social Relations in a Muslim Community. Chicago: University of Chicago Press, 1984.
- The Anthropology of Justice: Law as Culture in Islamic Society. Cambridge: Cambridge University Press, 1989.
- The Justice of Islam: Comparative Perspectives on Islamic Law and Society. Oxford: Oxford University Press, 2000
- The Culture of Islam: Changing Aspects of Contemporary Muslim Life. Chicago: University of Chicago Press, 2004
- Law as Culture: An Invitation. Princeton: Princeton University Press, 2008.
- Varieties of Muslim Experience: Encounters with Arab Political and Cultural Life. Chicago: University of Chicago Press, 2008.
- Two Arabs, a Berber, and a Jew: Entangled Lives in Morocco. Chicago: University of Chicago Press, 2015.
- Islam and the Rule of Justice: Image and Reality in Muslim Law and Culture, Chicago: University of Chicago Press, 2018.
