= Cognitivism (psychology) =

Theoretical framework for understanding the mind

In psychology, cognitivism is a theoretical framework for understanding the mind that gained credence in the 1950s. The movement was a response to behaviorism, which cognitivists said neglected to explain cognition. Cognitive psychology derives its name from the Latin cognoscere, referring to knowing and information; thus, cognitive psychology is an information-processing psychology derived in part from earlier traditions of the investigation of thought and problem solving.

Behaviorists acknowledged the existence of thinking but identified it as a behavior. Cognitivists argued that the way people think impacts their behavior and therefore cannot be a behavior in and of itself. Cognitivists later claimed that thinking is so essential to psychology that the study of thinking should become its own field. However, cognitivists typically presuppose a specific form of mental activity, of the kind advanced by computationalism.

Cognitivism has more recently been challenged by postcognitivism.

== Cognitive development ==
The process of assimilating and expanding our intellectual horizon is termed as cognitive development. We have a complex physiological structure that absorbs a variety of stimuli from the environment, stimuli being the interactions that are able to produce knowledge and skills. Parents process knowledge informally in the home while teachers process knowledge formally in school. Knowledge should be pursued with zest and zeal; if not, then learning becomes a burden.

== Attention ==
Attention is the first part of cognitive development. It pertains to a person's ability to focus and sustain concentration. Attention can also be how focus minded an individual is and having their full concentration on one thing. It is differentiated from other temperamental characteristics like persistence and distractibility in the sense that the latter modulates an individual's daily interaction with the environment. Attention, on the other hand, involves this behavior when performing specific tasks. Learning, for instance, takes place when the student gives attention towards the teacher. Interest and effort closely relate to attention. Attention is an active process which involves numerous outside stimuli. The attention of an organism at any point in time involves three concentric circles; beyond awareness, margin, and focus. Individuals have a mental capacity; there are only so many things someone can focus on at one time.

A theory of cognitive development called information processing holds that memory and attention are the foundation of cognition. It is suggested that children's attention is initially selective and is based on situations that are important to their goals. This capacity increases as the child grows older since they are more able to absorb stimuli from tasks. Another conceptualization classified attention into mental attention and perceptual attention. The former is described as the executive-driven attentional "brain energy" that activates task-relevant processes in the brain while the latter are immediate or spontaneous attention driven by novel perceptual experiences.

== Process of learning ==
Cognitive theory mainly stresses the acquisition of knowledge and growth of the mental structure. Cognitive theory tends to focus on conceptualizing the student's learning process: how information is received; how information is processed and organized into existing schema; how information is retrieved upon recall. In other words, cognitive theory seeks to explain the process of knowledge acquisition and the subsequent effects on the mental structures within the mind. Learning is not about the mechanics of what a learner does, but rather a process depending on what the learner already knows (existing information) and their method of acquiring new knowledge (how they integrate new information into their existing schemas). Knowledge acquisition is an activity consisting of internal codification of mental structures within the student's mind. Inherent to the theory, the student must be an active participant in their own learning process. Cognitive approaches mainly focus on the mental activities of the learner like mental planning, goal setting, and organizational strategies. In cognitive theories not only the environmental factors and instructional components play an important role in learning. There are additional key elements like learning to code, transform, rehearse, and store and retrieve the information. The learning process includes learner's thoughts, beliefs, and attitude values.

== Role of memory ==
Memory plays a vital role in the learning process. Information is stored within memory in an organised, meaningful manner. Here, teacher and designers play different roles in the learning process. Teachers supposedly facilitate learning and the organization of information in an optimal way. Whereas designers supposedly use advanced techniques (such as analogies, mnemonic devices, and hierarchical relationships) to help learners acquire new information to add to their prior knowledge. Forgetting is described as an inability to retrieve information from memory. Memory loss may be a mechanism used to discard situationally irrelevant information by assessing the relevance of newly acquired information.

== Process of transfer ==
According to cognitive theory, if a learner knows how to implement knowledge in different contexts and conditions, then we can say that transfer has occurred. Understanding is composed of knowledge - in the form of rules, concepts and discrimination. Knowledge stored in memory is important, but the use of such knowledge is also important. Prior knowledge will be used for identifying similarities and differences between itself and novel information.

== Types of learning explained in detail by this position ==
Cognitive theory mostly explains complex forms of learning in terms of reasoning, problem solving and information processing. Emphasis must be placed on the fact that the goal of all aforementioned viewpoints is considered to be the same - the transfer of knowledge to the student in the most efficient and effective manner possible. Simplification and standardization are two techniques used to enhance the effectiveness and efficiency of knowledge transfer. Knowledge can be analysed, decomposed and simplified into basic building blocks. There is a correlation with the behaviorist model of the knowledge transfer environment. Cognitivists stress the importance of efficient processing strategies.

== Basic principles of the cognitive theory and relevance to instructional design ==
A behaviorist uses feedback (reinforcement) to change the behavior in the desired direction, while the cognitivist uses the feedback for guiding and supporting the accurate mental connections. For different reasons learners' task analyzers are critical to both cognitivists and behaviorists. Cognitivists look at the learner's predisposition to learning (How does the learner activate, maintain, and direct their learning?). Additionally, cognitivists examine the learners' 'how to design' instruction that it can be assimilated. (i.e., what about the learner's existing mental structures?) In contrast, the behaviorists look to determine where the lesson should begin (i.e., at what level the learners are performing successfully?) and what are the most effective reinforcements (i.e., What are the consequences that are most desired by the learner?).

There are some specific assumptions or principles that direct the instructional design: active involvement of the learner in the learning process, learner control, metacognitive training (e.g., self-planning, monitoring, and revising techniques), the use of hierarchical analyses to identify and illustrate prerequisite relationships (cognitive task analysis procedure), facilitating optimal processing of structuring, organizing and sequencing information (use of cognitive strategies such as outlining, summaries, synthesizers, advance organizers etc.), encouraging the students to make connections with previously learned material, and creating learning environments (recall of prerequisite skills; use of relevant examples, analogies).

== Structuring instruction ==
Cognitive theories emphasize mainly on making knowledge meaningful and helping learners to organize and relate new information to existing knowledge in memory. Instruction should be based on students' existing schema or mental structures, to be effective. The organisation of information is connected in such a manner that it should relate to the existing knowledge in some meaningful way. Examples of cognitive strategies include the use of analogies and metaphors, framing, outlining the mnemonics, concept mapping, advance organizers, and so forth. The cognitive theory mainly emphasizes the major tasks of the teacher / designer and includes analyzing various learning experiences to the learning situation, which can impact learning outcomes of different individuals. Organizing and structuring the new information to connect the learners' previously acquired knowledge abilities and experiences. The new information is effectively and efficiently assimilated/accommodated within the learners cognitive structure.

== Theoretical approach ==
Cognitivism has two major components, one methodological, the other theoretical. Methodologically, cognitivism has a positivist approach and says that psychology can be (in principle) fully explained by the use of the scientific method, there is speculation on whether or not this is true. This is also largely a reductionist goal, with the belief that individual components of mental function (the 'cognitive architecture') can be identified and meaningfully understood. The second says that cognition contains discrete and internal mental states (representations or symbols) that can be changed using rules or algorithms.

Cognitivism became the dominant force in psychology in the late-20th century, replacing behaviorism as the most popular paradigm for understanding mental function. Cognitive psychology is not a wholesale refutation of behaviorism, but rather an expansion that accepts that mental states exist. This was due to the increasing criticism towards the end of the 1950s of simplistic learning models. One of the most notable criticisms was Noam Chomsky's argument that language could not be acquired purely through conditioning, and must be at least partly explained by the existence of internal mental states.

The main issues that interest cognitive psychologists are the inner mechanisms of human thought and the processes of knowing. Cognitive psychologists have attempted to shed some light on the alleged mental structures that stand in a causal relationship to our physical actions.

== Criticisms of psychological cognitivism ==
In the 1990s, various new theories emerged that challenged cognitivism and the idea that thought was best described as computation. Some of these new approaches, often influenced by phenomenological and postmodern philosophy, include situated cognition, distributed cognition, dynamicism and embodied cognition. Some thinkers working in the field of artificial life (for example Rodney Brooks) have also produced non-cognitivist models of cognition. On the other hand, much of early cognitive psychology, and the work of many currently active cognitive psychologists, does not treat cognitive processes as computational. The idea that mental functions can be described as information processing models has been criticised by philosopher John Searle and mathematician Roger Penrose who both argue that computation has some inherent shortcomings which cannot capture the fundamentals of mental processes.

- Penrose uses Gödel's incompleteness theorem (which states that there are mathematical truths which can never be proven in a sufficiently strong mathematical system; any sufficiently strong system of axioms will also be incomplete) and Turing's halting problem (which states that there are some things which are inherently non-computable) as evidence for his position.
- Searle has developed two arguments, the first (well known through his Chinese room thought experiment) is the 'syntax is not semantics' argument—that a program is just syntax, while understanding requires semantics; therefore programs (hence cognitivism) cannot explain understanding. Such an argument presupposes the controversial notion of a private language. The second, which Searle now prefers but is less well known, is his 'syntax is not physics' argument—nothing in the world is intrinsically a computer program except as applied, described, or interpreted by an observer, so either everything can be described as a computer and trivially a brain can but then this does not explain any specific mental processes, or there is nothing intrinsic in a brain that makes it a computer (program). Many oppose these views and have criticized his arguments, which have created significant disagreement. Both points, Searle claims, refute cognitivism.

Another argument against cognitivism is the problems of Ryle's Regress or the homunculus fallacy. Cognitivists have offered a number of arguments attempting to refute these attacks.

== See also ==
- Cognition – Mental process dealing with knowledge
- Cognitive psychology – Subdiscipline of psychology
- Cognitive revolution – 1950s intellectual movement
- Cognitive science – Interdisciplinary scientific study of cognitive processes
- Computational theory of mind – Family of views in the philosophy of mind
- Consciousness – Awareness of internal and external existence
- Critical psychology – Perspective on psychology
- Educational psychology – Branch of psychology concerned with the scientific study of human learning
- Enactivism – Philosophical concept
- Mentalism (psychology) – Once-antagonistic term for the study of mental perception and thought processes
- Phenomenology – Philosophical method and schools of philosophy
- Postcognitivism – Movements in cognitive science critical of cognitivism
- Symbol grounding problem – Cognitive science issue
