= Ghost in the Machine (artwork) =

1981 performance by American artist Linda Nishio

Ghost in the Machine, originally titled A Good House Is Hard to Find, is a 1981 performance created by American artist Linda Nishio. The work combines written and spoken text, slide projection and film, sound, sculpture, and the use of an assistant. She originally performed it at Franklin Furnace in New York City and performed other iterations through 1983, including at the Woman's Building in Los Angeles. Her second performance for the New York nonprofit space was reviewed by Lucy Lippard for the Village Voice, and included in Lippard's 1984 book, Get the Message: A Decade of Art for Social Change.

== Description ==
The piece begins with images of a tormented woman, projected with a recording of voices asking "Hey, why are you so tormented?" With Nishio on stage, wearing a house covering her face and head, a dialectic is created between emotions and thinking, then a recording of Nishio's voice outlines an effort to stay in control while participating in daily life:

[W]hile the telephone rings and the dog shuffles by someone knocks at the door. Why don't you just sit down and think, think, think, think.

A diagram of the artist's head is flashed with the word think repeated and pointing to various parts of the brain. There is a film of Nishio inside the house that she wears. She performs a monologue about the thinking process after which she takes off the house and throws across the stage. A meditation tape is played, and the artist lies down performing the soothing exercises instructed. The final instruction is

[I]nside the brain, imagine a huge switchboard. Walk over to it and pull out all the plugs but one. Your only thought is your whole body, feeling quiet, comfortable, relaxed.

The piece also makes use of Nishio's shadow, and her assistant comes in throughout the performance to put up then take down cutouts of women. In the earlier Franklin Furnace performance, the house covered Nishio's midsection.

== Critical reception ==
Of the 1983 performance at the Woman's Building, Terry Wolverton described it as:

a fast-paced multi-media tour of the activities of the brain, and of the person who tries to live inside the brain, disassociated from flesh, spirit, emotion ... Nishio plugs her audience into the rhythms of the over-taxed, over-stimulated nervous system.

Wolverton complains about the size of the L.A. performance space lauding the work itself writing, "there's scarcely a superfluous movement, image, or word." She further writes of Nishio's performance, "It is rare to witness a performer undergo an internal process while performing, and this willingness to be vulnerable gives the work a great sense of depth and strength."

Lippard in her book called the work "bitterly beautiful," its meanings "layered," its images "striking." The critic interpreted the performance's themes as racism, real estate, and dislocation, and the use of "'interior decoration' as a metaphor for cultural differences."
