= Thick description =

Description of human social action, with context

In the social sciences and related fields, a thick description is a description of human social action that describes not just physical behaviors, but their context as interpreted by the actors as well, so that it can be better understood by an outsider. A thick description typically adds a record of subjective explanations and meanings provided by the people engaged in the behaviors, making the collected data of greater value for studies by other social scientists.

The term was first introduced by 20th-century philosopher Gilbert Ryle. However, the predominant sense in which it is used today was developed by anthropologist Clifford Geertz in his book The Interpretation of Cultures (1973) to characterise his own method of doing ethnography. Since then, the term and the methodology it represents has gained widespread currency, not only in the social sciences but also, for example, in the type of literary criticism known as New Historicism.

== Gilbert Ryle ==
Thick description was first introduced by the British philosopher Gilbert Ryle in 1968 in "The Thinking of Thoughts: What is 'Le Penseur' Doing?" and "Thinking and Reflecting". Ryle distinguished between two general types of description:

1. thin, which includes surface-level observations of behaviour; and
2. thick, which adds context to such behaviour.

To explain such context required grasping individuals' motivations for their behaviors and how these behaviors were understood by other observers of the community as well.

This method emerged at a time when the ethnographic school was pushing for an ethnographic approach that paid particular attention to everyday events. The school of ethnography thought seemingly arbitrary events could convey important notions of understanding that could be lost at first glance. Similarly Bronisław Malinowski put forth the concept of a native point of view in his 1922 work, Argonauts of the Western Pacific. Malinowski felt that an anthropologist should try to understand the perspectives of ethnographic subjects in relation to their own world.

== Clifford Geertz ==
Following Ryle's work, the American anthropologist Clifford Geertz re-popularized the concept. Known for his symbolic and interpretive anthropological work, Geertz's methods were in response to his critique of existing anthropological methods that searched for universal truths and theories. He was against comprehensive theories of human behavior; rather, he advocated methodologies that highlight culture from the perspective of how people looked at and experienced life. His 1973 article, "Thick Description: Toward an Interpretive Theory of Culture", synthesizes his approach.

Thick description emphasized a more analytical approach, whereas previously observation alone was the primary approach. To Geertz, analysis separated observation from interpretative methodologies. An analysis is meant to pick out the critical structures and established codes. This analysis begins with distinguishing all individuals present and coming to an integrative synthesis that accounts for the actions produced. The ability of thick descriptions to showcase the totality of a situation to aid in the overall understanding of findings was called mélange of descriptors. As Lincoln & Guba (1985) indicate, findings are not the result of thick description; rather they result from analyzing the materials, concepts, or persons that are "thickly described."

Geertz (1973) takes issue with the state of anthropological practices in understanding culture. By highlighting the reductive nature of ethnography, to reduce culture to "menial observations," Geertz hoped to reintroduce ideas of culture as semiotic. By this he intended to add signs and deeper meaning to the collection of observations. These ideas would challenge Edward Burnett Tylor's concepts of culture as a "most complex whole" that is able to be understood; instead culture, to Geertz, could never be fully understood or observed. Because of this, ethnographic observations must rely on the context of the population being studied by understanding how the participants come to recognize actions in relation to one another and to the overall structure of the society in a specific place and time. Today, various disciplines have implemented thick description in their work.

Geertz pushes for a search for a "web of meaning". These ideas were incompatible with textbook definitions of ethnography of the times that described ethnography as systematic observations of different populations under the guise of Race categorization and categorizing the "other." To Geertz, culture should be treated as symbolic, allowing for observations to be connected with greater meanings.

This approach brings about its own difficulties. Studying communities via large-scale anthropological interpretation will bring about discrepancies in understanding. As cultures are dynamic and changing, Geertz also emphasizes the importance of speaking to rather than speaking for the subjects of ethnographic research and recognizing that cultural analysis is never complete. This method is essential to approach the actual context of a culture. As such, Geertz points out that interpretive works provide ethnographers the ability to have conversations with the people they study.

== Interpretive turn ==
Geertz is revered for his pioneering field methods and clear, accessible prose writing style (cf. Robinson's critique, 1983). He was considered "for three decades...the single most influential cultural anthropologist in the United States."

Interpretive methodologies were needed to understand culture as a system of meaning. Because of this, Geertz's influence is connected with "a massive cultural shift" in the social sciences - referred to as the interpretive turn. The interpretive turn in the social sciences had strong foundations in the methodology of cultural anthropology. A shift occurred from using structural approaches (as an interpretive lens) towards meaning. With the interpretive turn, contextual and textual information took the lead in understanding reality, language, and culture. This was all under the assumption that a better anthropology included understanding the particular behaviors of the communities being studied.

Geertz's thick-description approach, along with the theories of Claude Lévi-Strauss, has become increasingly recognized as a method of symbolic anthropology, enlisted as a working antidote to overly technocratic, mechanistic means of understanding cultures, organizations, and historical settings. Influenced by Gilbert Ryle, Ludwig Wittgenstein, Max Weber, Paul Ricoeur, and Alfred Schütz, the method of descriptive ethnography that came to be associated with Geertz is credited with resuscitating field research from an endeavor of ongoing objectification—the focus of research being "out there"—to a more immediate undertaking, where participant observation embeds the researcher in the enactment of the settings being reported. However, despite its dissemination among the disciplines, some theorists pushed back on thick description, skeptical about its ability to somehow interpret meaning by compiling large amounts of data. They also questioned how this data was supposed to provide the totality of a society naturally.

== See also ==
- Claude Lévi-Strauss
- Contextualism
- Cultural studies
- Indexicality
- Symbolic anthropology
