= Category mistake =

Ascribing an impossible property to a thing

A category mistake (or category error, categorical mistake, or mistake of category) is a semantic or ontological error in which things belonging to a particular category are presented as if they belong to a different category, or, alternatively, a property is ascribed to a thing that could not possibly have that property. An example is a person learning that the game of cricket involves team spirit, and after being given a demonstration of each player's role, asking which player performs the "team spirit".

== History ==
Al Martinich claims that the philosopher Thomas Hobbes was the first to discuss a propensity among philosophers to mistakenly combine words taken from different and incompatible categories.

The term "category-mistake" was introduced by Gilbert Ryle in his book The Concept of Mind (1949) to remove what he argued to be a confusion over the nature of mind born from Cartesian metaphysics. Ryle argues that it is a mistake to treat the mind as an object made of an immaterial substance because predications of substance are not meaningful for a collection of dispositions and capacities.

The phrase is introduced in the first chapter. The first example is of a visitor to Oxford. The visitor, upon viewing the colleges and library, reportedly inquires "But where is the University?" The visitor's mistake is presuming that a University is part of the category "units of physical infrastructure", rather than that of an "institution". In his second example, a child witnesses the march-past of a division of soldiers. After having had battalions, batteries, squadrons, etc. pointed out to him, the child asks when the division is going to appear. He is told that "the march-past was not a parade of battalions, batteries, squadrons and a division; it was a parade of the battalions, batteries and squadrons of a division" (Ryle's italics). His third example is of a foreigner being shown a cricket match. After having the batsmen, bowlers and fielders pointed out to him, the foreigner asks: "who is left to contribute the famous element of team-spirit?" He goes on to argue that the Cartesian dualism of mind and body rests on a category mistake (Ryle, pp.19-20).

Massimo Pigliucci, Professor of Philosophy at the City University of New York, argues that the "hard problem of consciousness", as expressed by David Chalmers and others, rests on a category mistake, in that explaining "experience" is being incorrectly treated as different from explaining the underlying biological processes which generate experience.

== See also ==
- Apples and oranges – Comparing items that cannot be compared
- Catachresis – Rhetorical misuse of a term
- Colorless green ideas sleep furiously – Syntactically well-formed, semantically incongruous phrase
- Not even wrong – English phrase
- Synecdoche – Figure of speech
- The Concept of Mind – 1949 book by Gilbert Ryle
- Type error (computer science) – Computer science concept
