= Ghost in the machine =

Description of René Descartes' mind-body dualism

"Ghost in the machine" is a term originally used to describe and critique the concept of the mind existing alongside and separate from the body. In more recent times, the term has had several uses, including the concept that the intellectual part of the human mind is influenced by emotions; and within fiction, for an emergent consciousness residing in a computer.

The term originates with British philosopher Gilbert Ryle's description of René Descartes' mind–body dualism. Ryle introduced the phrase in The Concept of Mind (1949) to highlight the view of Descartes and others that mental and physical activity occur simultaneously but separately.

== Gilbert Ryle ==
Gilbert Ryle (1900–1976) was a philosopher who lectured at Oxford and made important contributions to the philosophy of mind and to "ordinary language philosophy". His most important writings include Philosophical Arguments (1945), The Concept of Mind (1949), Dilemmas (1954), Plato's Progress (1966), and On Thinking (1979).

Ryle's Concept of Mind (1949) critiques the notion that the mind is distinct from the body, and refers to the idea as "the ghost in the machine". According to Ryle, the classical theory of mind, or "Cartesian rationalism", makes a basic category mistake (a new logical fallacy Ryle himself invented), as it attempts to analyze the relation between "mind" and "body" as if they were terms of the same logical category. This confusion of logical categories may be seen in other theories of the relation between mind and matter. For example, the idealist theory of mind makes a basic category mistake by attempting to reduce physical reality to the same status as mental reality, while the materialist theory of mind makes a basic category mistake by attempting to reduce mental reality to the same status as physical reality.

=== Official doctrine ===
Ryle states that the doctrine of body/mind dualism was the "official doctrine", or dogma, of philosophers:

There is a doctrine about the nature and place of the mind which is prevalent among theorists, to which most philosophers, psychologists and religious teachers subscribe with minor reservations. Although they admit certain theoretical difficulties in it, they tend to assume that these can be overcome without serious modifications being made to the architecture of the theory.... [The doctrine states that] with the doubtful exceptions of the mentally-incompetent and infants-in-arms, every human being has both a body and a mind.... The body and the mind are ordinarily harnessed together, but after the death of the body the mind may continue to exist and function.

The central principles of the doctrine, according to Ryle, are unsound and conflict with the entire body of what we know about the mind. Of the doctrine, he says "According to the official doctrine each person has direct and unchangeable cognisance. In consciousness, self-consciousness and introspection, he is directly and authentically apprised of the present states of operation of the mind."

=== "Descartes' Myth" ===
In his essay "Descartes' Myth", Ryle's philosophical arguments lay out his notion of the mistaken foundations of mind-body dualism. He suggests that, to speak of mind and body as substances, as a dualist does, is to commit a category mistake.

Ryle attempts to show that the "official doctrine" of mind/body dualism is false by asserting that it confuses two logical-types, or categories, as being compatible: "it represents the facts of mental life as if they belonged to one logical type/category, when they actually belong to another. The dogma is therefore a philosopher's myth."

== In popular culture ==
Ghost in the Machine is a popular title for novels, films, albums, and songs. See Ghost in the machine (disambiguation) for a more complete list of works named Ghost in the Machine.

== See also ==
- Cognitive revolution
- Dualism (philosophy of mind)
- Hard problem of consciousness
