= Wolfgang Schirmacher =

Swiss academic (born 1944)

Wolfgang Schirmacher (born 1944) is a German philosopher, editor and educator in the field of philosophy, art and critical thought. He was the Founding Dean of the Media and Communications division at the European Graduate School, where he now is a full professor and holder of the Arthur Schopenhauer Chair of Philosophy. He has edited several journals and written books, as well as developed curricula in philosophical disciplines at major universities.

== Biography ==
Schirmacher has taught philosophy at the University of Hamburg, is a former Core Faculty Member of the Media Studies Graduate Program, New School for Social Research, and Director of International Relations, Philosophy and Technology Studies Center, Polytechnic University of New York. He is the editor of the philosophy journals Schopenhauer-Studien and New York Studies in Media Philosophy. He is also an internationally active philosopher of technology with emphasis on media, gene technology, and neuroscience, as well as president of the International Schopenhauer Association, and chair of the Artificial Life Group.

== Selected bibliography ==
- (editor with Sven Nebelung): German Essays On Psychology. The German Library 62. The Continuum International Publishing Group. New York, London, November 2000, 330 pages, Hardcover, ISBN 0-8264-1237-8.
- (editor): German 20th Century Philosophy: The Frankfurt School. The German Library 78. The Continuum International Publishing Group. New York, London, February 2000, 324 pages, Hardcover, ISBN 0-8264-0966-0.
- (editor): German Socialist Philosophy: Feuerbach, Marx, Engels. The German Library 40. The Continuum International Publishing Group. New York, London, December 1996, Hardcover, ISBN 0-8264-0748-X.
- (editor): German Essays On Science In The 20th Century. The German Library 82. The Continuum International Publishing Group. New York, London, October 1996, 314 pages, Hardcover, ISBN 0-8264-0746-3.
- (editor): German Essays On Science In The 19th Century. The German Library 36. The Continuum International Publishing Group. New York, London, September 1996, 330 pages, Hardcover, ISBN 0-8264-0744-7.
- (editor): Ethik und Vernunft: Schopenhauer in unserer Zeit. Schopenhauer-Studien 5. Passagen Verlag. Vienna, 1995, 387 pages, Paperback, ISBN 3-85165-023-9.
- (editor): Arthur Schopenhauer. Schopenhauer: Philosophical Writings. The German Library 27. The Continuum International Publishing Group. New York, London, July 1994, 300 pages, Paperback ISBN 0-8264-0729-3.
- Schopenhauer, Nietzsche Und Die Kunst. Schopenhauer-Studien 4. Passagen Verlag. Vienna, 1992, 400 pages.
- (Editor with Jacques Poulain), Arno Münster (Translation). Penser après Heidegger. La Philosophie en commun. L'Harmattan. Paris, 1992, 360 pages, Paperback (Broché), ISBN 2-7384-1064-2.
- Ereignis Technik. Passagen Philosophie 33. Passagen Verlag. Vienna, 1990, 245 pages, Paperback, ISBN 3-900767-36-X.
- Schopenhauer In Der Postmoderne. Schopenhauer-Studien 3. Passagen Verlag. Vienna, 1989, 400 pages.
- (editor): Zeitkritik Nach Heidegger. Reihe Philosophie 9. Die blaue Eule. Essen, 1988, 240 pages.
- Schopenhauer Aktualität: Ein Philosoph wird neu gelesen. Schopenhauer-Studien 1/2. Passagen Verlag. Vienna, 1988, 400 pages.
- Schopenhauer. Insel-Almanach 1985. Insel. Frankfurt, 1985, 249 pages, Paperback, ISBN 3-458-14188-X.
- Schopenhauer Und Nietzsche. Schopenhauer-Jahrbuch 1984. W.Kramer. Frankfurt, 1984, 326 pages.
- Zeit Der Ernte: Studien zum Stand der Schopenhauer-Forschung. Frommann-Holzboog. Stuttgart, 1983, 447 pages.
- Technik und Gelassenheit. Zeitkritik nach Heidegger. Fermenta philosophica. Alber Freiburg. München, 1983, 274 pages. Hiroshi Kojima (Partial Translation). Niigata University Press. Niigata, 1986.
- Ereignis Technik: Heidegger und die Frage nach der Technik. Dissertation. Hamburg, 1980, 310 pages.
