= Artificial brain =

Emulation of animal or human brain

An artificial brain (or artificial mind) is software and hardware with cognitive abilities similar to those of the animal or human brain.

Research investigating "artificial brains" and brain emulation plays three important roles in science:

1. An ongoing attempt by neuroscientists to understand how the human brain works, known as cognitive neuroscience.
2. A thought experiment in the philosophy of artificial intelligence, demonstrating that it is possible, at least in theory, to create a machine that has all the capabilities of a human being.
3. A long-term project to create machines exhibiting behavior comparable to those of animals with complex central nervous system such as mammals and most particularly humans. The ultimate goal of creating a machine exhibiting human-like behavior or intelligence is sometimes called strong AI.

An example of the first objective is the project reported by Aston University in Birmingham, England where researchers are using biological cells to create "neurospheres" (small clusters of neurons) in order to develop new treatments for diseases including Alzheimer's, motor neurone and Parkinson's disease.

The second objective is a reply to arguments such as John Searle's Chinese room argument, Hubert Dreyfus's critique of AI or Roger Penrose's argument in The Emperor's New Mind. These critics argued that there are aspects of human consciousness or expertise that can not be simulated by machines. One reply to their arguments is that the biological processes inside the brain can be simulated to any degree of accuracy. This reply was made as early as 1950, by Alan Turing in his classic paper "Computing Machinery and Intelligence". (Note: The critics: Searle, John (1980), "Minds, Brains and Programs", Behavioral and Brain Sciences, 3 (3): 417–457, doi:10.1017/S0140525X00005756, archived from the original on December 10, 2007; Dreyfus, Hubert (1972), What Computers Can't Do, New York: MIT Press, ISBN 0-06-090613-8; Penrose, Roger (1989), The Emperor's New Mind: Concerning Computers, Minds, and The Laws of Physics, Oxford University Press, Bibcode:1989esnm.book.....P, ISBN 0-14-014534-6; Turing's (pre-emptive) response: Turing, Alan (October 1950). "Computing Machinery and Intelligence". Mind. 59 (236): 433–460. doi:10.1093/mind/LIX.236.433. ISSN 1460-2113. JSTOR 2251299. S2CID 14636783.; Other sources that agree with Turing: Moravec, Hans (1988), Mind Children, Harvard University Press; Kurzweil, Ray (2005), The Singularity is Near, New York: Viking Press, ISBN 0-670-03384-7.)

The third objective is generally called artificial general intelligence by researchers. However, Ray Kurzweil prefers the term "strong AI". In his book The Singularity is Near, he focuses on whole brain emulation using conventional computing machines as an approach to implementing artificial brains, and claims (on grounds of computer power continuing an exponential growth trend) that this could be done by 2025. Henry Markram, director of the Blue Brain project (which is attempting brain emulation), made a similar claim (2020) at the Oxford TED conference in 2009.

== Approaches to brain simulation ==
W. Ross Ashby's pioneering work in cybernetics provided an early mathematical framework for understanding adaptive brain-like systems. In his 1952 book Design for a Brain, Ashby proposed that the brain could be modeled as an ultrastable system that maintains equilibrium through continuous adaptation to environmental perturbations. His approach used differential equations and state-space models to describe how neural systems could exhibit purposeful behavior through feedback mechanisms. Ashby's homeostat, a physical machine built in 1948, demonstrated these principles through an electromechanical device with four interconnected units that automatically adjusted their parameters to maintain stability when disturbed. The homeostat represented one of the first attempts to build an artificial system exhibiting brain-like adaptive behavior, influencing subsequent work in adaptive systems, neural networks, and artificial intelligence.

Estimates of how much processing power is needed to emulate a human brain at various levels (from Ray Kurzweil, and Anders Sandberg and Nick Bostrom), along with the fastest supercomputer from TOP500 mapped by year

Although direct human brain emulation using artificial neural networks on a high-performance computing engine is a commonly discussed approach, there are other approaches. An alternative artificial brain implementation could be based on Holographic Neural Technology (HNeT) non linear phase coherence/decoherence principles. The analogy has been made to quantum processes through the core synaptic algorithm which has strong similarities to the quantum mechanical wave equation.

EvBrain is a form of evolutionary software that can evolve "brainlike" neural networks, such as the network immediately behind the retina.

In November 2008, IBM received a US$4.9 million grant from the Pentagon for research into creating intelligent computers. The Blue Brain project is being conducted with the assistance of IBM in Lausanne. The project is based on the premise that it is possible to artificially link the neurons "in the computer" by placing thirty million synapses in their proper three-dimensional position.

Some proponents of strong AI speculated in 2009 that computers in connection with Blue Brain and Soul Catcher may exceed human intellectual capacity by around 2015, and that it is likely that we will be able to download the human brain at some time around 2050.

While Blue Brain is able to represent complex neural connections on the large scale, the project does not achieve the link between brain activity and behaviors executed by the brain. In 2012, project Spaun (Semantic Pointer Architecture Unified Network) attempted to model multiple parts of the human brain through large-scale representations of neural connections that generate complex behaviors in addition to mapping.

Spaun's design recreates elements of human brain anatomy. The model, consisting of approximately 2.5 million neurons, includes features of the visual and motor cortices, GABAergic and dopaminergic connections, the ventral tegmental area (VTA), substantia nigra, and others. The design allows for several functions in response to eight tasks, using visual inputs of typed or handwritten characters and outputs carried out by a mechanical arm. Spaun's functions include copying a drawing, recognizing images, and counting.

There are good reasons to believe that, regardless of implementation strategy, the predictions of realising artificial brains in the near future are optimistic. In particular brains (including the human brain) and cognition are not currently well understood, and the scale of computation required is unknown. Another near term limitation is that all current approaches for brain simulation require orders of magnitude larger power consumption compared with a human brain. The human brain consumes about 20 W of power, whereas current supercomputers may use as much as 1 MW—i.e., an order of 100,000 more.

== Artificial brain thought experiment ==
Some critics of brain simulation believe that it is simpler to create general intelligent action directly without imitating nature. Some commentators have used the analogy that early attempts to construct flying machines modeled them after birds, but that modern aircraft do not look like birds.

== See also ==
- AI takeover
- Animat
- Artificial consciousness
- Artificial intelligence
- Artificial intelligence and elections
- Artificial Intelligence System
- Artificial life
- Philosophy of artificial intelligence
- Biological neural networks
- Blue Brain
- CoDi
- Cognitive architecture
- Effective altruism
- Existential risk from advanced artificial intelligence
- Future of Humanity Institute
- Human Brain Project
- Multi-agent system
- Neuromorphic computing
- Never-Ending Language Learning
- Nick Bostrom
- Outline of artificial intelligence
- OpenWorm
- Robotics
- Simulated reality
- Superintelligence
- Turing's Wager
