= GOFAI =

Symbolic AI and its influence on philosophy and psychology

In the philosophy of artificial intelligence, GOFAI (good old-fashioned artificial intelligence) is classical symbolic AI, as opposed to other approaches, such as neural networks, situated robotics, narrow symbolic AI or neuro-symbolic AI. The term was coined by philosopher John Haugeland in his 1985 book Artificial Intelligence: The Very Idea.

Haugeland coined the term to address two questions:

- Can GOFAI produce human-level artificial intelligence in a machine?
- Is GOFAI the primary method that brains use to display intelligence?

AI founder Herbert A. Simon speculated in 1963 that the answers to both these questions was "yes". His evidence was the performance of programs he had co-written, such as Logic Theorist and the General Problem Solver, and his psychological research on human problem solving.

AI research in the 1950s and 60s had an enormous influence on intellectual history: it inspired the cognitive revolution, led to the founding of the academic field of cognitive science, and was the essential example in the philosophical theories of computationalism, functionalism and cognitivism in ethics and the psychological theories of cognitivism and cognitive psychology. The specific aspect of AI research that led to this revolution was what Haugeland called "GOFAI".

In AI development and technology, GOFAI is used to refer to programs that are built with deliberate, explicit instructions for a single task. This is in contrast to approaches that use machine learning. Examples of GOFAI applications include AlphaGo and Apple's initial Siri design.

== Western rationalism ==
Haugeland places GOFAI within the rationalist tradition in western philosophy, which holds that abstract reason is the "highest" faculty, that it is what separates man from the animals, and that it is the most essential part of our intelligence. This assumption is present in Plato and Aristotle, in Shakespeare, Hobbes, Hume and Locke, it was central to the Enlightenment, to the logical positivists of the 1930s, and to the computationalists and cognitivists of the 1960s. As Shakespeare wrote:

What a piece of work is a man, How noble in reason, how infinite in faculty ... In apprehension how like a god, The beauty of the world, The paragon of animals.

Symbolic AI in the 1960s was able to successfully simulate the process of high-level reasoning, including logical deduction, algebra, geometry, spatial reasoning and means-ends analysis, all of them in precise English sentences, just like the ones humans used when they reasoned. Many observers, including philosophers, psychologists and the AI researchers themselves became convinced that they had captured the essential features of intelligence. This was not just hubris or speculation -- this was entailed by rationalism. If it was not true, then it brings into question a large part of the entire Western philosophical tradition.

Continental philosophy, which included Nietzsche, Husserl, Heidegger and others, rejected rationalism and argued that our high-level reasoning was limited and prone to error, and that most of our abilities come from our intuitions, culture, and instinctive feel for the situation. Philosophers who were familiar with this tradition were the first to criticize GOFAI and the assertion that it was sufficient for intelligence, such as Hubert Dreyfus and Haugeland.

== Haugeland's GOFAI ==
Critics and supporters of Haugeland's position, from philosophy, psychology, or AI research have found it difficult to define "GOFAI" precisely, and thus the literature contains a variety of interpretations. Drew McDermott, for example, finds Haugeland's description of GOFAI "incoherent" and argues that GOFAI is a "myth".

Haugeland coined the term GOFAI in order to examine the philosophical implications of “the claims essential to all GOFAI theories”, which he listed as:

1. our ability to deal with things intelligently is due to our capacity to think about them reasonably (including sub-conscious thinking); and

2. our capacity to think about things reasonably amounts to a faculty for internal “automatic” symbol manipulation

— Haugeland (1985, p. 113)

This is very similar to the sufficient side of the physical symbol systems hypothesis proposed by Herbert A. Simon and Allen Newell in 1963:

"A physical symbol system has the necessary and sufficient means for general intelligent action."

— Newell & Simon (1976, p. 116)

It is also similar to Hubert Dreyfus' "psychological assumption":

"The mind can be viewed as a device operating on bits of information according to formal rules. "

— Dreyfus (1979, p. 157)

Haugeland's description of GOFAI refers to symbol manipulation governed by a set of instructions for manipulating the symbols. The "symbols" he refers to are discrete physical things that are assigned a definite semantics -- like <cat> and <mat>. They do not refer to signals, or unidentified numbers, or matrixes of unidentified numbers, or the zeros and ones of digital machinery. Thus, Haugeland's GOFAI does not include "good old fashioned" techniques such as cybernetics, perceptrons, dynamic programming or control theory or modern techniques such as neural networks or support vector machines.

These questions ask if GOFAI is sufficient for general intelligence -- they ask if there is nothing else required to create fully intelligent machines. Thus GOFAI, for Haugeland, does not include systems that combine symbolic AI with other techniques, such as neuro-symbolic AI, and also does not include narrow symbolic AI systems that are designed only to solve a specific problem and are not expected to exhibit general intelligence.

== Replies ==
=== Replies from AI scientists ===
Russell and Norvig wrote, in reference to Dreyfus and Haugeland:

The technology they criticized came to be called Good Old-Fashioned AI (GOFAI). GOFAI corresponds to the simplest logical agent design ... and we saw ... that it is indeed difficult to capture every contingency of appropriate behavior in a set of necessary and sufficient logical rules; we called that the qualification problem.

Later symbolic AI work after the 1980s incorporated more robust approaches to open-ended domains such as probabilistic reasoning, non-monotonic reasoning, and machine learning.

Currently, most AI researchers believe deep learning, and more likely, a synthesis of neural and symbolic approaches (neuro-symbolic AI), will be required for general intelligence.
