= Fernando Flores =

Chilean engineer, entrepreneur and politician (born 1943)

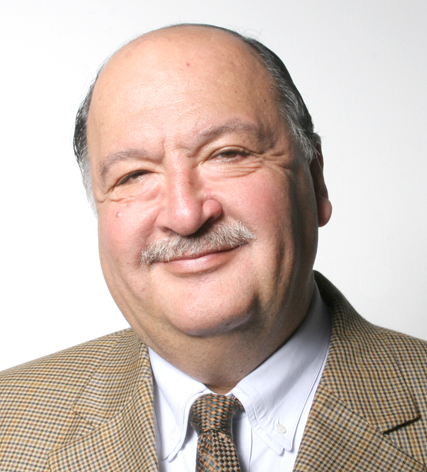

General Secretary of the Government of Chile
- In office 9 August 1973 – 11 September 1973
- President: Salvador Allende
- Preceded by: Aníbal Palma
- Succeeded by: Pedro Ewing

Minister of Finance
- In office 29 December 1972 – 9 August 1973
- President: Salvador Allende
- Preceded by: Orlando Millas
- Succeeded by: Raúl Montero Cornejo

Personal details
- Born: Carlos Fernando Flores Labra; January 9, 1943 (age 83) Talca, Chile
- Education: University of California, Berkeley
- Website: Personal blog

Carlos Fernando Flores Labra (born January 9, 1943) is a Chilean engineer, philosopher, entrepreneur and politician. He is a former cabinet minister of president Salvador Allende and was senator for the Arica and Parinacota and Tarapacá regions between 2001 and 2009. On March 31, 2010, he was designated President of Chile's National Innovation Council for Competitiveness by President Sebastián Piñera.

== Biography ==
Flores was born in Talca, Chile. He became finance minister in the government of Chilean president Salvador Allende and then spent three years as a political prisoner (from September 11, 1973, to 1976) after the military coup of General Augusto Pinochet. Subsequently, forced into exile after negotiations on his behalf by Amnesty International, he moved with his family to Palo Alto, California, and worked as a researcher in the Computer Science department at Stanford University.

Flores "had spent his prison years reading philosophy books smuggled in by friends and family, and emerged steeped in phenomenology, the study of the structures of experience and consciousness." While at Stanford Flores met and began a long collaboration with Terry Winograd. He subsequently obtained his PhD at UC Berkeley under the guidance of Hubert Dreyfus, Stuart Dreyfus, John Searle and Ann Markussen.

At Berkeley he developed his work on philosophy, coaching and workflow technology, influenced by Martin Heidegger, Humberto Maturana, John Austin and others. Flores's thesis was titled Management and Communication in the Office of the Future.

Winograd has said that when he met Flores, "his life changed." Conversations with Flores helped to convince Winograd that the AI research of the time (symbolic AI, or GOFAI) was based in a faulty understanding of the nature of cognition. Winograd's own pathbreaking earlier research was included within the scope of this critique. These conversations between Winograd and Flores led to work on a manuscript that would become their co-authored book, Understanding Computers and Cognition: A New Foundation For Design.

== Projects and companies founded ==
Flores has founded several companies including "Hermenet" (in partnership with Werner Erhard); "Logonet", a design, logistics, and manufacturing company; "Business Design Associates", a management consulting company) and Action Technologies, a software company, where he introduced new distinctions in workflow analysis, groupware, software design and business process analysis that he developed in association with Terry Winograd. He has also founded an Internet-based movement called Atina Chile. His newest project is Pluralistic Networks, a professional development company dedicated to teaching skills and sensibilities enabling people to work together with others while navigating turbulent historical times.

== Politics ==
Flores was Finance Minister of president Salvador Allende in the early 1970s and later the Secretary General of the Government and, during the Coup, he was alongside the President in La Moneda Palace. After the coup d'état he was imprisoned, subjected to prolonged, systematic psychological torture and later driven to exile by the military regime of Augusto Pinochet. Prior to being appointed Finance Minister by Allende, Flores was responsible for launching and overseeing Project Cybersyn, "one of the most ambitious applications of cybernetics in history."

In 2001 Flores was elected senator for the Tarapacá Region, as a member of the center-left Party for Democracy (PPD), a constituent party of the governing coalition Concertación.

On March 31, 2010, he was designated President of Chile's National Innovation Council for Competitiveness by President Piñera, position that he held until September 2013. In this role he was responsible to produce a report that he entitled Surfing into the Future.

== Influence on modern coaching industry ==
Flores exerted a significant influence on the development of the modern coaching industry by collaborating with or influencing several individuals who would become prominent leaders in the coach training industry. In the mid-1970's Flores was hired by Werner Erhard to offer workshops for his office staff. Shortly after, Flores began offering, through his companies Hermenet, Inc. and Logonet, Inc., a workshop called "Communication for Action." This workshop was based partially on his interpretation of the theory of Speech Acts by J.L. Austin and John Searle.

For Austin and Searle, the theory of Speech Acts was just that, a theory; they did not pursue its practical implications. Flores transformed the theory of Speech Acts into a set of practices for refining how people take care of concerns, commitments, and relationships in conversation. As Flores expresses this in his book with Terry Winograd, Understanding Computers and Cognition: "there exists a domain for education in communicative competence: the fundamental relationships between language and successful action. People’s conscious knowledge of their participation in the network of commitments can be reinforced and developed, improving their capacity to act in the domain of language." Thus, "This training in 'communication for action' reveals for people how their language acts participate in a network of human commitments."

As Hubert Dreyfus put it, Flores's work enabled people to "awaken from the sleep of thinking that they were exchanging information about the world, and take responsibility for the kind of being-with-others they were making for themselves ... By developing their sensitivity to their constituting roles, business people, among others, became more entrepreneurial, more flexible, and more innovative. This was Flores’s version of the authenticity Heidegger describes in Division II of Being and Time."

In her study of the emergence of professional coaching, Dr. Vikki Brock identifies the collaboration between Werner Erhard and Fernando Flores as a convergence point that gave rise to a specific and distinct coaching lineage. However, after a brief association Flores and Erhard parted ways. Flores continued to develop his distinctive theory and practice of coaching and consulting. His 1997 book, Disclosing New Worlds (with Charles Spinosa and Hubert Dreyfus) captures some of the later developments in his approach.

== Publications ==
- Building Trust: In Business, Politics, Relationships, and Life, (author)
- Understanding Computers and Cognition : A New Foundation for Design (with Terry Winograd), (co-author)
- Disclosing New Worlds: Entrepreneurship, Democratic Action, and the Cultivation of Solidarity, (co-author, with Charles Spinosa and Hubert Dreyfus)
- Conversations For Action and Collected Essays: Instilling a Culture of Commitment in Working Relationships
- Beyond Calculation: The Next Fifty Years, a special issue of the Communications of the ACM journal, (contributor)
- Entrepreneurship and the wired life : Work in the wake of careers (with John Gray), Demos (2000)

== See also ==
- Language/action perspective
- Project Cybersyn
