= Artificial mind =

Artificial mind may refer to:

- Artificial brain
- Artificial consciousness
- Artificial intelligence
- A shortened version of the prior name of the Canadian video game development company Behaviour Interactive
