= Super intelligence (disambiguation) =

A superintelligence is a hypothetical agent that possesses intelligence far surpassing that of human minds.

Super intelligence or superintelligence may also refer to:

- Superintelligence: Paths, Dangers, Strategies, a 2014 book by Nick Bostrom
- Superintelligence (film), a 2020 film by Ben Falcone
- "Super intelligence", a name for artificial intelligence mandated for US federal agencies in 2026 by Executive Order 14434

== See also ==
- Strong AI (disambiguation)
