= Stuart Dreyfus =

American industrial engineer, control theorist and mathematician

A native of Terre Haute, Indiana, Stuart Ernest Dreyfus is professor emeritus at University of California, Berkeley in the Industrial Engineering and Operations Research Department.

While at the Rand Corporation he was a programmer of the JOHNNIAC computer. While at Rand he coauthored Applied Dynamic Programming with Richard Bellman. Following that work, he was encouraged to pursue a Ph.D. which he completed in applied mathematics at Harvard University in 1964, on the calculus of variations. In 1962, Dreyfus simplified the Dynamic Programming-based derivation of backpropagation (due to Henry J. Kelley and Arthur E. Bryson) using only the chain rule. He also coauthored Mind Over Machine with his brother Hubert Dreyfus in 1986.
