= Hubert Dreyfus's views on artificial intelligence =

Book cover of the 1979 paperback edition

Hubert Dreyfus was a critic of artificial intelligence research. In a series of papers and books, including Alchemy and AI (1965), What Computers Can't Do (1972; 1979; 1992) and Mind over Machine (1986), he presented a skeptical and cautious assessment of AI's progress and a critique of the philosophical foundations of the field. Dreyfus' objections are discussed in most introductions to the philosophy of artificial intelligence, including Russell & Norvig (2021), a standard AI textbook, and in Fearn (2007), a survey of contemporary philosophy.

Dreyfus argued that human intelligence and expertise depend primarily on yet-to-be understood informal and unconscious processes rather than symbolic manipulation and that these essentially human skills cannot be fully captured in formal rules. His critique was based on the insights of modern continental philosophers such as Merleau-Ponty and Heidegger, and was directed at the first wave of AI research which tried to reduce intelligence to high level formal symbols.

When Dreyfus' ideas were first introduced in the mid-1960s, they were met in the AI community with ridicule and outright hostility. By the 1980s, however, some of his perspectives were rediscovered by researchers working in robotics and the new field of connectionism—approaches that were called "sub-symbolic" at the time because they eschewed early AI research's emphasis on high level symbols.

In the 21st century, "sub-symbolic" artificial neural networks and other statistics-based approaches to machine learning were highly successful. Historian and AI researcher Daniel Crevier wrote: "time has proven the accuracy and perceptiveness of some of Dreyfus's comments." Dreyfus said in 2007, "I figure I won and it's over—they've given up."

== Dreyfus' critique ==
=== The grandiose promises of artificial intelligence ===
In Alchemy and AI (1965) and What Computers Can't Do (1972), Dreyfus summarized the history of artificial intelligence and ridiculed the unbridled optimism that permeated the field. For example, Herbert A. Simon, following the success of his program General Problem Solver (1957), predicted that by 1967:

1. A computer would be world champion in chess.
2. A computer would discover and prove an important new mathematical theorem.
3. Most theories in psychology will take the form of computer programs.

The press dutifully reported these predictions of the imminent arrival of machine intelligence.

Dreyfus felt that this optimism was unwarranted and, in 1965, argued forcefully that predictions like these would not come true. He would eventually be proven right. Pamela McCorduck explains Dreyfus' position:

A great misunderstanding accounts for public confusion about thinking machines, a misunderstanding perpetrated by the unrealistic claims researchers in AI have been making, claims that thinking machines are already here, or at any rate, just around the corner.

These predictions were based on the success of the cognitive revolution, which promoted an "information processing" model of the mind. It was articulated by Newell and Simon in their physical symbol systems hypothesis, and later expanded into a philosophical position known as computationalism by philosophers such as Jerry Fodor and Hilary Putnam. In AI, the approach is now called symbolic AI or "GOFAI".

Dreyfus argued that "symbolic AI" was the latest version of the ancient program of rationalism in philosophy. Rationalism had come under heavy criticism in the 20th century from philosophers like Martin Heidegger and Edmund Husserl. The mind, according to modern continental philosophy, is not "rationalist" and is nothing like a digital computer.

Cognitivism led early AI researchers to believe that they had successfully simulated the essential process of human thought, thus it seemed a short step to producing fully intelligent machines. Dreyfus' last paper detailed the ongoing history of the "first step fallacy", where AI researchers tend to wildly extrapolate initial success as promising, perhaps even guaranteeing, wild future successes.

=== Dreyfus' four assumptions of artificial intelligence research ===
In Alchemy and AI and What Computers Can't Do, Dreyfus identified four philosophical assumptions, at least one of which he deems necessary for AI to succeed. "In each case," Dreyfus writes, "the assumption is taken by workers in AI as an axiom, guaranteeing results, whereas it is, in fact, one hypothesis among others, to be tested by the success of such work."

Dreyfus argues that AI would be impossible without accepting at least one of these four assumptions:

The biological assumption
The brain processes information in discrete operations by way of some biological equivalent of on/off switches.

In the early days of research into neurology, scientists found that neurons fire in all-or-nothing pulses. Several researchers, such as Walter Pitts and Warren McCulloch, speculated with great confidence that neurons functioned similarly to the way Boolean logic gates operate, and so could be imitated by electronic circuitry at the level of the neuron. When digital computers became widely used in the early 50s, this argument was extended to suggest that the brain was a vast physical symbol system, manipulating the binary symbols of zero and one. Dreyfus was able to refute the biological assumption by citing research in neurology that suggested that the action and timing of neuron firing had analog components. But Daniel Crevier observes that "few still held that belief in the early 1970s, and nobody argued against Dreyfus" about the biological assumption.

The psychological assumption
The mind can be viewed as a device operating on bits of information according to formal rules.

He refuted this assumption by showing that much of what we know about the world consists of complex attitudes or tendencies that make us lean towards one interpretation over another. He argued that, even when we use explicit symbols, we are using them against an unconscious and informal background including commonsense knowledge and that without this background our symbols cease to mean anything. This background, in Dreyfus' view, was not implemented in individual brains as explicit individual symbols with explicit individual meanings.

The epistemological assumption
All knowledge can be formalized.

This concerns the philosophical issue of epistemology, or the study of knowledge. Even if we agree that the psychological assumption is false, AI researchers could still argue (as AI founder John McCarthy has) that it is possible for a symbol processing machine to represent all knowledge, regardless of whether human beings represent knowledge the same way. Dreyfus argued that there is no justification for this assumption, since so much of human knowledge is not symbolic or even expressible using formal constructs.

The ontological assumption
The world consists of independent facts that can be represented by independent symbols

AI researchers (and futurists and science fiction writers) often assume that there is no limit to formal, scientific knowledge, because they assume that any phenomenon in the universe can be described by symbols or scientific theories. This assumes that everything that exists can be understood as objects, properties of objects, classes of objects, relations of objects, and so on: precisely those things that can be described by logic, language and mathematics. The study of being or existence is called ontology, and so Dreyfus calls this the ontological assumption. If this is false, then it raises doubts about what we can ultimately know and what intelligent machines will ultimately be able to help us to do.

=== Knowing-how vs. knowing-that: the primacy of intuition ===
In Mind Over Machine (1986), written (with his brother) during the heyday of expert systems, Dreyfus analyzed the difference between human expertise and the programs that claimed to capture it. This expanded on ideas from What Computers Can't Do, where he had made a similar argument criticizing the "cognitive simulation" school of AI research practiced by Allen Newell and Herbert A. Simon in the 1960s.

Dreyfus argued that human problem solving and expertise depend on our background sense of the context, of what is important and interesting given the situation, rather than on the process of searching through combinations of possibilities to find what we need. Dreyfus would describe it in 1986 as the difference between "knowing-that" and "knowing-how", based on Heidegger's distinction of present-at-hand and ready-to-hand.

Knowing-that is our conscious, step-by-step problem solving abilities. We use these skills when we encounter a difficult problem that requires us to stop, step back and search through ideas one at time. At moments like this, the ideas become very precise and simple: they become context free symbols, which we manipulate using logic and language. These are the skills that Newell and Simon had demonstrated with both psychological experiments and computer programs. Dreyfus argued that these "knowing-that" skills -- the conscious, rational problem solving techniques the Newell and Simon had modeled -- were a relatively small part of intelligent behavior and were far from sufficient for human-level intelligence.

Knowing-how, on the other hand, is the way we deal with things normally. We take actions without using conscious symbolic reasoning at all, as when we recognize a face, drive ourselves to work or find the right thing to say. We seem to simply jump to the appropriate response, without explicitly considering any alternatives. This is the essence of skill and expertise, Dreyfus argued: when our intuitions have been trained to the point that we forget the rules and simply "size up the situation" and react.

The human sense of the situation, according to Dreyfus, is based on our goals, our bodies and our culture—all of our unconscious intuitions, attitudes and knowledge of the world. This "context" or "background" (related to Heidegger's Dasein) is a form of knowledge that is not stored symbolically, but intuitively in some way. It affects what we notice and what we don't notice, what we expect and what possibilities we don't consider: we discriminate between what is essential and inessential. The things that are inessential are relegated to our "fringe consciousness" (borrowing a phrase from William James): the millions of things we're aware of, but we're not really thinking about right now.

Dreyfus did not believe that AI programs could capture this "background" or do the kind of fast problem solving that it allows. He argued that our unconscious knowledge could never be captured symbolically. If AI could not find a way to address these issues, then it was doomed to failure, an exercise in "tree climbing with one's eyes on the moon."

== History ==
Dreyfus began to formulate his critique in the early 1960s while he was a professor at MIT, then a hotbed of artificial intelligence research. His first publication on the subject is a half-page objection to a talk given by Herbert A. Simon in the spring of 1961. Dreyfus was especially bothered, as a philosopher, that AI researchers seemed to believe they were on the verge of solving many long standing philosophical problems within a few years, using computers.

=== "Alchemy and AI" ===
In 1965, Dreyfus was hired by Paul Armer to spend the summer at RAND Corporation's Santa Monica facility, where he would write "Alchemy and AI", the first salvo of his attack. Armer had thought he was hiring an impartial critic and was surprised when Dreyfus produced a scathing paper intended to demolish the foundations of the field. (Armer stated he was unaware of Dreyfus' previous publication.) Armer delayed publishing it, but ultimately realized that "just because it came to a conclusion you didn't like was no reason not to publish it." It finally came out as RAND Memo and soon became a best seller.

The paper flatly ridiculed AI research, comparing it to alchemy: a misguided attempt to change metals to gold based on a theoretical foundation that was no more than mythology and wishful thinking. It ridiculed the grandiose predictions of leading AI researchers, predicting that there were limits beyond which AI would not progress and intimating that those limits would be reached soon.

=== Reaction ===
The paper "caused an uproar", according to Pamela McCorduck. The AI community's response was derisive and personal. Seymour Papert dismissed one third of the paper as "gossip" and claimed that every quotation was deliberately taken out of context. Herbert A. Simon accused Dreyfus of playing "politics" so that he could attach the prestigious RAND name to his ideas. Simon said, "what I resent about this was the RAND name attached to that garbage".

Dreyfus, who taught at MIT, remembers that his colleagues working in AI "dared not be seen having lunch with me." Joseph Weizenbaum, the author of ELIZA, felt his colleagues' treatment of Dreyfus was unprofessional and childish. Although he was an outspoken critic of Dreyfus' positions, he recalls, "I became the only member of the AI community to be seen eating lunch with Dreyfus. And I deliberately made it plain that theirs was not the way to treat a human being."

The paper was the subject of a "short" in The New Yorker magazine on June 11, 1966. The piece mentioned Dreyfus' contention that, while computers may be able to play checkers, no computer could yet play a decent game of chess. It reported with wry humor (as Dreyfus had) about the victory of a ten-year-old over the leading chess program, with "even more than its usual smugness."

In hope of restoring AI's reputation, Seymour Papert arranged a chess match between Dreyfus and Richard Greenblatt's Mac Hack program. Dreyfus lost, much to Papert's satisfaction. An Association for Computing Machinery bulletin used the headline:

"A Ten Year Old Can Beat the Machine— Dreyfus: But the Machine Can Beat Dreyfus"

Dreyfus complained in print that he hadn't said a computer will never play chess, to which Herbert A. Simon replied: "You should recognize that some of those who are bitten by your sharp-toothed prose are likely, in their human weakness, to bite back ... may I be so bold as to suggest that you could well begin the cooling---a recovery of your sense of humor being a good first step."

=== Vindicated ===
By the early 1990s several of Dreyfus' radical opinions had become mainstream.

Failed predictions. As Dreyfus had foreseen, the grandiose predictions of early AI researchers failed to come true. Fully intelligent machines (now known as "strong AI") did not appear in the mid-1970s as predicted. HAL 9000 (whose capabilities for natural language, perception and problem solving were based on the advice and opinions of Marvin Minsky) did not appear in the year 2001. "AI researchers", writes Nicolas Fearn, "clearly have some explaining to do." In the 90s and early 2000s, AI researchers were more reluctant to make the kind of predictions that had been made in the early days. (However, by the time of the AI boom in the 2020s, optimistic predictions again became commonplace.)

The biological assumption, although common in the forties and early fifties, was no longer assumed by most AI researchers by the time Dreyfus published What Computers Can't Do. Although many still argue that it is essential to reverse-engineer the brain by simulating the action of neurons (such as Ray Kurzweil or Jeff Hawkins), they don't assume that neurons are essentially digital, but rather that the action of analog neurons can be simulated by digital machines to a reasonable level of accuracy. (Alan Turing had made this same observation as early as 1950.)

The psychological assumption and unconscious skills. Many AI researchers have come to agree that human reasoning does not consist primarily of high-level symbol manipulation. In fact, since Dreyfus first published his critiques in the 60s, AI research in general has moved away from high level symbol manipulation, towards new models that are intended to capture more of our unconscious reasoning. Daniel Crevier writes that by 1993, unlike 1965, AI researchers "no longer made the psychological assumption", and had continued forward without it.

"Sub-symbolic" AI techniques operate in a way that is superficially similar to what Dreyfus called "sizing up the situation and reacting", but here the "situation" consists of vast amounts of numerical data. Dreyfus agreed in 1992 that these methods can capture some "tendencies" and "attitudes" that he considers essential for intelligence and expertise.

Sub-symbolic approaches to AI include:

- Robotics researchers like Hans Moravec and Rodney Brooks were among the first to realize that unconscious skills would prove to be the most difficult to reverse engineer. (See Moravec's paradox.) Brooks would spearhead a movement in the late 80s that took direct aim at the use of high-level symbols, called Nouvelle AI. The situated movement in robotics research attempts to capture our unconscious skills at perception and attention. (Dreyfus would critique this research program in 2012.)
- Connectionism, an umbrella term in the 1980s for the research program that included artificial neural networks.
- In the 1990s, soft computing paradigms allowed machines to "guess" – to make inexact, probabilistic decisions and predictions based on experience and learning.
- Computational intelligence was a sub-field of AI in the 1990s and early 2000s that collected all these sub-symbolic techniques under one roof.
- Finally, in the first decades of the 21st century, artificial neural networks were enormously successful, culminating in the dominance of "deep learning" after 2012.

All of this research has gone forward without any direct connection to Dreyfus' work.

Knowing-how and knowing-that. Research in psychology and economics has been able to show that Dreyfus' (and Heidegger's) arguments about the nature of human problem solving was essentially correct. Daniel Kahnemann and Amos Tversky collected a vast amount of hard evidence that human beings use (at least) two very different methods to solve problems, which they named "system 1" and "system 2". System one, also known as the adaptive unconscious, is fast, intuitive and unconscious. System 2 is slow, logical and deliberate. Their research was collected in the book Thinking, Fast and Slow, and inspired Canadian journalist Malcolm Gladwell's popular book Blink.

As with AI, this research was entirely independent of both Dreyfus and Heidegger.

=== Ignored ===
Although clearly AI research has come to agree with aspects of Dreyfus' thought, McCorduck claimed that "my impression is that this progress has taken place piecemeal and in response to tough given problems, and owes nothing to Dreyfus."

The AI community, with a few exceptions, chose not to respond to Dreyfus directly. "He's too silly to take seriously" a researcher told Pamela McCorduck. Marvin Minsky said of Dreyfus (and the other critiques coming from philosophy) that "they misunderstand, and should be ignored." When Dreyfus expanded Alchemy and AI to book length and published it as What Computers Can't Do in 1972, no one from the AI community chose to respond (with the exception of a few critical reviews). McCorduck asks "If Dreyfus is so wrong-headed, why haven't the artificial intelligence people made more effort to contradict him?"

Part of the problem was the kind of philosophy that Dreyfus used in his critique. Dreyfus was an expert in modern European philosophers (like Heidegger and Merleau-Ponty). AI researchers of the 1960s, by contrast, based their understanding of the human mind on engineering principles and efficient problem solving techniques related to management science. On a fundamental level, they spoke a different language. Edward Feigenbaum complained, "What does he offer us? Phenomenology! That ball of fluff. That cotton candy!" In 1965, there was simply too huge a gap between European philosophy and artificial intelligence, a gap that has since been filled by cognitive science, psychology and artificial neural networks.

Another problem was that Dreyfus claimed (or seemed to claim) that AI would never be able to capture the human ability to understand context, situation or purpose in the form of rules. But (as Peter Norvig and Stuart Russell would later explain), an argument of this form cannot be won: just because one cannot imagine formal rules that govern human intelligence and expertise, this does not mean that no such rules exist. They quote Alan Turing's answer to all arguments similar to Dreyfus's:

"we cannot so easily convince ourselves of the absence of complete laws of behaviour ... The only way we know of for finding such laws is scientific observation, and we certainly know of no circumstances under which we could say, 'We have searched enough. There are no such laws.'"

In 1965, Dreyfus did not imagine that such programs would one day be created, so he claimed AI was impossible. In 1965, AI researchers did not imagine that such programs were necessary, so they claimed AI was almost complete. Both were wrong.

A more serious issue was the impression that Dreyfus' critique was incorrigibly hostile. McCorduck wrote, "His derisiveness has been so provoking that he has estranged anyone he might have enlightened. And that's a pity." Daniel Crevier stated that "time has proven the accuracy and perceptiveness of some of Dreyfus's comments. Had he formulated them less aggressively, constructive actions they suggested might have been taken much earlier."

Decades later, Dreyfus wrote that the responses to his critique has most often been based on a very partial and shallow understanding of it. However, progress has been made towards addressing his criticisms and Dreyfus has accepted that.

=== Dreyfus's final critique of Heideggerian AI ===
In 2007, Dreyfus published a paper titled "Why Heideggerian AI Failed and How Fixing it Would Require Making It More Heideggerian", in which he reassesses the contemporary status of AI. While acknowledging efforts at reorienting artificial intelligence research beyond "Good Old Fashioned AI" (GOFAI) towards "Heideggerian AI", he offers new criticisms on the shortcomings of existing programs.

In particular, Dreyfus considers Brooks's "behavior-based robots" and Phil Agre and David Chapman's "Pengi" as recent examples of Heideggerian AI. He rejects both programs as having neglected the dimension of learning new relevance in a worldly context. A more trivial version of this problem has also been referred to as the "frame problem".

On the one hand, Dreyfus criticizes Rodney Brooks's robots for "respond[ing] only to *fixed features* of the environment", and therefore merely "converting stimulus input into reflex responses". It contrasts with the ability to comprehend and effectively learn the world as a context of practical significance, or "what-for", to human intelligence, as opposed to merely a totality of things. This echoes Heidegger's comparison between the "world-poor" quality of animals versus human Dasein's capacity of "world-making" in The Principle of Reason.

On the other, Pengi also fails to meet Dreyfus's criterion of a genuinely Heideggerian AI. While Dreyfus praises Agre's understanding of "readiness-to-hand" as functions rather than entities, the program nevertheless involves "no skill [...] and no learning", but instead deterministically triggers responses that are evaluated based on set benchmark. The remark coincides with Dreyfus's commentary on Deep Blue's victory against Garry Kasparov, which noted that the machine is only responding to the "isolated domain" of chess, as opposed to the full range of possibilities of the "rest of the human life". While some may argue that recent developments in artificial general intelligence (AGI) may have invalidated Dreyfus's objection, Fjelland (2020) argued that a disembodied AI could never handle "causal questions" that depend on a model of reality.

Dreyfus then moves on to consider Michael Wheeler's "embodied-embedded paradigm" as a refinement of Heideggerian AI. He accuses Wheeler of a "cognitivst misreading" for understanding Heidegger's insight to be the human capacity to use representational equipments external to the body. Instead, "being-in-the-world" is non-representationalist on the most basic level as a background to coping. The mind, therefore, does not "extend" into the background but exists within it. However, this objection has also been challenged by others as resting on an absolute dichotomy between reflective and pre-reflective modes of intentional behavior.

Finally, Dreyfus examines Walter Freeman's program of Heideggerian neurodynamics, which sought to provide the material basis to phenomenological concepts in terms of a self-organizing neural "perception-action loop". In this model, relevant brain states are "attracted" to each other, while the brain switches from one equilibrium to another. The resulting dynamic system characterizes the "intentional arc" that affords contextual significance to actions. One complication Dreyfus does not address, however, is that this "neurodynamics of intention" is not distinctive of human intelligence, but as e.g. Freeman (2015) has argued, evolved from "[...] Ordovician period as a tool to prowl first olfactory environments, then environments of other modalities."

He concludes by asserting that future AI program must:

"model [...] our particular way of being embedded and embodied such that what we experience is significant for us in the particular way that it is [...] with our needs, desires, pleasures, pains, ways of moving, cultural background, etc."

== See also ==
- Adaptive unconscious
- Church–Turing thesis
- Computer chess
- Hubert Dreyfus
- Philosophy of artificial intelligence
