= Strong AI =

Strong AI, or strong artificial intelligence, may refer to:

- Artificial general intelligence, that matches or surpasses human cognitive capabilities across a wide range of cognitive tasks
- Strong AI hypothesis, a philosophical position in the Chinese room argument
- Superintelligence, a hypothetical agent that possesses intelligence far surpassing that of human minds

== See also ==
- Super Intelligence (disambiguation)
- Weak artificial intelligence
- Artificial consciousness
