= Philosophy of artificial intelligence =

Branch of philosophy

The philosophy of artificial intelligence is a branch of the philosophy of mind and the philosophy of computer science that explores artificial intelligence and its implications for knowledge and understanding of intelligence, ethics, consciousness, epistemology, and free will. Furthermore, the technology is concerned with the creation of artificial animals or artificial people (or, at least, artificial creatures; see artificial life), so the discipline is of considerable interest to philosophers. These factors contributed to the emergence of the philosophy of artificial intelligence.

The philosophy of artificial intelligence attempts to answer such questions as:

- Can a machine act intelligently? Can it solve any problem that a person would solve by thinking?
- Are human intelligence and machine intelligence the same? Is the human brain essentially a computer?
- Can a machine have a mind, mental states, and consciousness in the same sense that a human being can? Can it feel how things are? (i.e. does it have qualia?)

Questions like these reflect the divergent interests of AI researchers, cognitive scientists and philosophers respectively. The scientific answers to these questions depend on the definition of "intelligence" and "consciousness" and exactly which "machines" are under discussion.

Important propositions in the philosophy of AI include some of the following:

- Turing's "polite convention": If a machine behaves as intelligently as a human being, then it is as intelligent as a human being.
- The Dartmouth proposal: "Every aspect of learning or any other feature of intelligence can in principle be so precisely described that a machine can be made to simulate it."
- Allen Newell and Herbert A. Simon's physical symbol system hypothesis: "A physical symbol system has the necessary and sufficient means of general intelligent action."
- John Searle's strong AI hypothesis: "The appropriately programmed computer with the right inputs and outputs would thereby have a mind in exactly the same sense human beings have minds."
- Hobbes' mechanism: "For 'reason' ... is nothing but 'reckoning,' that is adding and subtracting, of the consequences of general names agreed upon for the 'marking' and 'signifying' of our thoughts..."

== Machine intelligence ==
In AI research, questions about "intelligence" are concerned with the behavior of machines, and is not generally concerned with the concept of thought.

=== Definitions of intelligence ===
==== Turing test ====
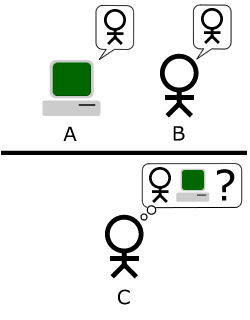
The "standard interpretation" of the Turing test

In 1949, computer scientist Alan Turing reduced the problem of defining intelligence to a simple question about conversation. He suggests that if a machine can answer any question posed to it, using the same words that an ordinary person would, then we may call that machine intelligent. A modern version of his experimental design would use an online chat room, where one of the participants is a real person and one of the participants is a computer program. The program passes the test if no one can tell which of the two participants is human. Turing notes that no one (except philosophers) ever asks the question "can people think?" He writes "instead of arguing continually over this point, it is usual to have a polite convention that everyone thinks". Turing's test extends this polite convention to machines, proposing that if a machine acts as intelligently as a human being, then it is as intelligent as a human being.

One criticism of the Turing test is that it only measures the "humanness" of the machine's behavior, rather than the "intelligence" of the behavior. Since human behavior and intelligent behavior are not exactly the same thing, the test fails to measure intelligence. Stuart J. Russell and Peter Norvig write that "aeronautical engineering texts do not define the goal of their field as 'making machines that fly so exactly like pigeons that they can fool other pigeons'".

==== Intelligence as achieving goals ====
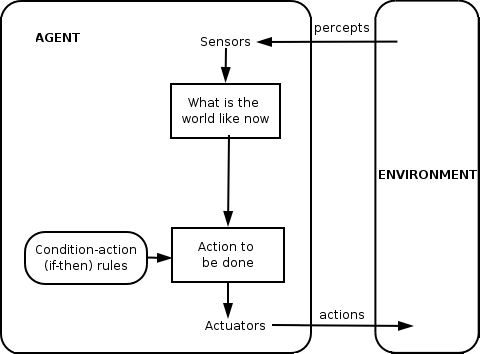
Simple reflex agent

Twenty-first century AI research defines intelligence in terms of goal-directed behavior. It views intelligence as a set of problems that the machine is expected to solve – the more problems it can solve, and the better its solutions are, the more intelligent the program is. AI founder John McCarthy defined intelligence as "the computational part of the ability to achieve goals in the world."

Stuart Russell and Peter Norvig formalized this definition using abstract intelligent agents. An "agent" is something which perceives and acts in an environment. A "performance measure" defines what counts as success for the agent.

- "If an agent acts so as to maximize the expected value of a performance measure based on past experience and knowledge then it is intelligent."

Definitions like this one try to capture the essence of intelligence. They have the advantage that, unlike the Turing test, they do not also test for unintelligent human traits such as making typing mistakes. They have the disadvantage that they can fail to differentiate between "things that think" and "things that do not". By this definition, even a thermostat has a rudimentary intelligence.

=== Arguments that a machine can display general intelligence ===
==== The brain can be simulated ====
An MRI scan of a normal adult human brain

Hubert Dreyfus describes this argument as claiming that "if the nervous system obeys the laws of physics and chemistry, which we have every reason to suppose it does, then ... we ... ought to be able to reproduce the behavior of the nervous system with some physical device". This argument, first introduced as early as 1943 and vividly described by Hans Moravec in 1988, is now associated with futurist Ray Kurzweil, who estimates that computer power will be sufficient for a complete brain simulation by the year 2029. A non-real-time simulation of a thalamocortical model that has the size of the human brain (10^{11} neurons) was performed in 2005, and it took 50 days to simulate 1 second of brain dynamics on a cluster of 27 processors.

Even AI's harshest critics (such as Hubert Dreyfus and John Searle) agree that a brain simulation is possible in theory. (Note: Hubert Dreyfus writes: "In general, by accepting the fundamental assumptions that the nervous system is part of the physical world and that all physical processes can be described in a mathematical formalism which can, in turn, be manipulated by a digital computer, one can arrive at the strong claim that the behavior which results from human 'information processing,' whether directly formalizable or not, can always be indirectly reproduced on a digital machine." . John Searle writes: "Could a man made machine think? Assuming it possible produce artificially a machine with a nervous system, ... the answer to the question seems to be obviously, yes ... Could a digital computer think? If by 'digital computer' you mean anything at all that has a level of description where it can be correctly described as the instantiation of a computer program, then again the answer is, of course, yes, since we are the instantiations of any number of computer programs, and we can think.") However, Searle points out that, in principle, anything can be simulated by a computer; thus, bringing the definition to its breaking point leads to the conclusion that any process at all can technically be considered "computation". "What we wanted to know is what distinguishes the mind from thermostats and livers," he writes. Thus, merely simulating the functioning of a living brain would in itself be an admission of ignorance regarding intelligence and the nature of the mind, like trying to build a jet airliner by copying a living bird precisely, feather by feather, with no theoretical understanding of aeronautical engineering.

==== Human thinking is symbol processing ====
In 1963, Allen Newell and Herbert A. Simon proposed that "symbol manipulation" was the essence of both human and machine intelligence. They wrote:

- "A physical symbol system has the necessary and sufficient means of general intelligent action."

This claim is very strong: it implies both that human thinking is a kind of symbol manipulation (because a symbol system is necessary for intelligence) and that machines can be intelligent (because a symbol system is sufficient for intelligence). Another version of this position was described by philosopher Hubert Dreyfus, who called it "the psychological assumption":

- "The mind can be viewed as a device operating on bits of information according to formal rules."

The "symbols" that Newell, Simon and Dreyfus discussed were word-like and high level—symbols that directly correspond with objects in the world, such as <dog> and <tail>. Most AI programs written between 1956 and 1990 used this kind of symbol. Modern AI, based on statistics and mathematical optimization, does not use the high-level "symbol processing" that Newell and Simon discussed.

=== Arguments against symbol processing ===
These arguments show that human thinking does not consist (solely) of high level symbol manipulation. They do not show that artificial intelligence is impossible, only that more than symbol processing is required.

==== Gödelian anti-mechanist arguments ====
In 1931, Kurt Gödel proved with an incompleteness theorem that it is always possible to construct a "Gödel statement" that a formal system of logic (such as a high-level symbol manipulation program) could not prove. Despite being a true statement, the constructed Gödel statement is unprovable within the given system. (The truth of the constructed Gödel statement is contingent on the consistency of the given system; applying the same process to a subtly inconsistent system will appear to succeed, but will actually yield a false "Gödel statement" instead.) More speculatively, Gödel conjectured that the human mind can eventually correctly determine the truth or falsity of any well-grounded mathematical statement (including any possible Gödel statement), and that therefore the human mind's power is not reducible to a mechanism. Philosopher John Lucas (since 1961) and Roger Penrose (since 1989) have championed this philosophical anti-mechanist argument.

Gödelian anti-mechanist arguments tend to rely on the innocuous-seeming claim that a system of human mathematicians (or some idealization of human mathematicians) is both consistent (completely free of error) and believes fully in its own consistency (and can make all logical inferences that follow from its own consistency, including belief in its Gödel statement). This is probably impossible for a Turing machine to do (see Halting problem); therefore, the Gödelian concludes that human reasoning is too powerful to be captured by a Turing machine, and by extension, any digital mechanical device.

However, the modern consensus in the scientific and mathematical community is that actual human reasoning is inconsistent; that any consistent "idealized version" H of human reasoning would logically be forced to adopt a healthy but counter-intuitive open-minded skepticism about the consistency of H (otherwise H is provably inconsistent); and that Gödel's theorems do not lead to any valid argument that humans have mathematical reasoning capabilities beyond what a machine could ever duplicate. This consensus that Gödelian anti-mechanist arguments are doomed to failure is laid out strongly in Artificial Intelligence: "any attempt to utilize (Gödel's incompleteness results) to attack the computationalist thesis is bound to be illegitimate, since these results are quite consistent with the computationalist thesis."

Stuart Russell and Peter Norvig agree that Gödel's argument does not consider the nature of real-world human reasoning. It applies to what can theoretically be proved, given an infinite amount of memory and time. In practice, real machines (including humans) have finite resources and will have difficulty proving many theorems. It is not necessary to be able to prove everything in order to be an intelligent person.

Less formally, Douglas Hofstadter, in his Pulitzer Prize winning book Gödel, Escher, Bach: An Eternal Golden Braid, states that these "Gödel-statements" always refer to the system itself, drawing an analogy to the way the Epimenides paradox uses statements that refer to themselves, such as "this statement is false" or "I am lying". But, of course, the Epimenides paradox applies to anything that makes statements, whether it is a machine or a human, even Lucas himself. Consider:

- Lucas can't assert the truth of this statement.

This statement is true but cannot be asserted by Lucas. This shows that Lucas himself is subject to the same limits that he describes for machines, as are all people, and so Lucas's argument is pointless.

After concluding that human reasoning is non-computable, Penrose went on to controversially speculate that some kind of hypothetical non-computable processes involving the collapse of quantum mechanical states give humans a special advantage over existing computers. Existing quantum computers are only capable of reducing the complexity of Turing computable tasks and are still restricted to tasks within the scope of Turing machines.. By Penrose and Lucas's arguments, the fact that quantum computers are only able to complete Turing computable tasks implies that they cannot be sufficient for emulating the human mind. Therefore, Penrose seeks some other process involving new physics, for instance quantum gravity which might manifest new physics at the scale of the Planck mass via spontaneous quantum collapse of the wave function. These states, he suggested, occur both within neurons and also spanning more than one neuron. However, other scientists point out that there is no plausible organic mechanism in the brain for harnessing any sort of quantum computation, and furthermore that the timescale of quantum decoherence seems too fast to influence neuron firing.

==== Dreyfus: the primacy of implicit skills ====
Hubert Dreyfus argued that human intelligence and expertise depended primarily on fast intuitive judgements rather than step-by-step symbolic manipulation, and argued that these skills would never be captured in formal rules.

Dreyfus's argument had been anticipated by Turing in his 1950 paper Computing machinery and intelligence, where he had classified this as the "argument from the informality of behavior." Turing argued in response that, just because we do not know the rules that govern a complex behavior, this does not mean that no such rules exist. He wrote: "we cannot so easily convince ourselves of the absence of complete laws of behaviour ... The only way we know of for finding such laws is scientific observation, and we certainly know of no circumstances under which we could say, 'We have searched enough. There are no such laws.'"

Russell and Norvig point out that, in the years since Dreyfus published his critique, progress has been made towards discovering the "rules" that govern unconscious reasoning. The situated movement in robotics research attempts to capture our unconscious skills at perception and attention. Computational intelligence paradigms, such as neural nets, evolutionary algorithms and so on are mostly directed at simulated unconscious reasoning and learning. Statistical approaches to AI can make predictions which approach the accuracy of human intuitive guesses. Research into commonsense knowledge has focused on reproducing the "background" or context of knowledge. In fact, AI research in general has moved away from high level symbol manipulation, towards new models that are intended to capture more of our intuitive reasoning.

Cognitive science and psychology eventually came to agree with Dreyfus' description of human expertise. Daniel Kahnemann and others developed a similar theory where they identified two "systems" that humans use to solve problems, which he called "System 1" (fast intuitive judgements) and "System 2" (slow deliberate step by step thinking).

Although Dreyfus' views have been vindicated in many ways, the work in cognitive science and in AI was in response to specific problems in those fields and was not directly influenced by Dreyfus. Historian and AI researcher Daniel Crevier wrote that "time has proven the accuracy and perceptiveness of some of Dreyfus's comments. Had he formulated them less aggressively, constructive actions they suggested might have been taken much earlier."

== Can a machine have a mind, consciousness, and mental states? ==
This is a philosophical question, related to the problem of other minds and the hard problem of consciousness. The question revolves around a position defined by John Searle as "strong AI":

- A physical symbol system can have a mind and mental states.

Searle distinguished this position from what he called "weak AI":

- A physical symbol system can act intelligently.

Searle introduced the terms to isolate strong AI from weak AI so he could focus on what he thought was the more interesting and debatable issue. He argued that even if we assume that we had a computer program that acted exactly like a human mind, there would still be a difficult philosophical question that needed to be answered.

Neither of Searle's two positions are of great concern to AI research, since they do not directly answer the question "can a machine display general intelligence?" (unless it can also be shown that consciousness is necessary for intelligence). Turing wrote "I do not wish to give the impression that I think there is no mystery about consciousness… [b]ut I do not think these mysteries necessarily need to be solved before we can answer the question [of whether machines can think]." Russell and Norvig agree: "Most AI researchers take the weak AI hypothesis for granted, and don't care about the strong AI hypothesis."

There are a few researchers who believe that consciousness is an essential element in intelligence, such as Igor Aleksander, Stan Franklin, Ron Sun, and Pentti Haikonen, although their definition of "consciousness" strays very close to "intelligence". (See artificial consciousness.)

Before we can answer this question, we must be clear what we mean by "minds", "mental states" and "consciousness".

=== Consciousness, minds, mental states, meaning ===
The words "mind" and "consciousness" are used by different communities in different ways. Some new age thinkers, for example, use the word "consciousness" to describe something similar to Bergson's "élan vital": an invisible, energetic fluid that permeates life and especially the mind. Science fiction writers use the word to describe some essential property that makes us human: a machine or alien that is "conscious" will be presented as a fully human character, with intelligence, desires, will, insight, pride and so on. (Science fiction writers also use the words "sentience", "sapience", "self-awareness" or "ghost"—as in the Ghost in the Shell manga and anime series—to describe this essential human property). For others, the words "mind" or "consciousness" are used as a kind of secular synonym for the soul.

For philosophers, neuroscientists and cognitive scientists, the words are used in a way that is both more precise and more mundane: they refer to the familiar, everyday experience of having a "thought in your head", like a perception, a dream, an intention or a plan, and to the way we see something, know something, mean something or understand something. "It's not hard to give a commonsense definition of consciousness" observes philosopher John Searle. What is mysterious and fascinating is not so much what it is but how it is: how does a lump of fatty tissue and electricity give rise to this (familiar) experience of perceiving, meaning or thinking?

Philosophers call this the hard problem of consciousness. It is the latest version of a classic problem in the philosophy of mind called the "mind-body problem". A related problem is the problem of meaning or understanding (which philosophers call "intentionality"): what is the connection between our thoughts and what we are thinking about (i.e. objects and situations out in the world)? A third issue is the problem of experience (or "phenomenology"): If two people see the same thing, do they have the same experience? Or are there things "inside their head" (called "qualia") that can be different from person to person?

Neurobiologists believe all these problems will be solved as we begin to identify the neural correlates of consciousness: the actual relationship between the machinery in our heads and its collective properties; such as the mind, experience and understanding. Some of the harshest critics of artificial intelligence agree that the brain is just a machine, and that consciousness and intelligence are the result of physical processes in the brain. The difficult philosophical question is this: can a computer program, running on a digital machine that shuffles the binary digits of zero and one, duplicate the ability of the neurons to create minds, with mental states (like understanding or perceiving), and ultimately, the experience of consciousness?

=== Arguments that a computer cannot have a mind and mental states ===
==== Searle's Chinese room ====
John Searle asks us to consider a thought experiment: suppose we have written a computer program that passes the Turing test and demonstrates general intelligent action. Suppose, specifically that the program can converse in fluent Chinese. Write the program on 3x5 cards and give them to an ordinary person who does not speak Chinese. Lock the person into a room and have him follow the instructions on the cards. He will copy out Chinese characters and pass them in and out of the room through a slot. From the outside, it will appear that the Chinese room contains a fully intelligent person who speaks Chinese. The question is this: is there anyone (or anything) in the room that understands Chinese? That is, is there anything that has the mental state of understanding, or which has conscious awareness of what is being discussed in Chinese? The man is clearly not aware. The room cannot be aware. The cards certainly are not aware. Searle concludes that the Chinese room, or any other physical symbol system, cannot have a mind.

Searle goes on to argue that actual mental states and consciousness require (yet to be described) "actual physical-chemical properties of actual human brains." He argues there are special "causal properties" of brains and neurons that gives rise to minds: in his words "brains cause minds."

==== Related arguments: Leibniz' mill, Davis's telephone exchange, Block's Chinese nation and Blockhead ====
Gottfried Leibniz made essentially the same argument as Searle in 1714, using the thought experiment of expanding the brain until it was the size of a mill. In 1974, Lawrence Davis imagined duplicating the brain using telephone lines and offices staffed by people, and in 1978 Ned Block envisioned the entire population of China involved in such a brain simulation. This thought experiment is called "the Chinese Nation" or "the Chinese Gym". Ned Block also proposed his Blockhead argument, which is a version of the Chinese room in which the program has been re-factored into a simple set of rules of the form "see this, do that", removing all mystery from the program.

==== Responses to the Chinese room ====
Responses to the Chinese room emphasize several different points.

- The systems reply and the virtual mind reply: This reply argues that the system, including the man, the program, the room, and the cards, is what understands Chinese. Searle claims that the man in the room is the only thing which could possibly "have a mind" or "understand", but others disagree, arguing that it is possible for there to be two minds in the same physical place, similar to the way a computer can simultaneously "be" two machines at once: one physical (like a Macintosh) and one "virtual" (like a word processor).
- Speed, power and complexity replies: Several critics point out that the man in the room would probably take millions of years to respond to a simple question, and would require "filing cabinets" of astronomical proportions. This brings the clarity of Searle's intuition into doubt.
- Robot reply: To truly understand, some believe the Chinese Room needs eyes and hands. Hans Moravec writes: "If we could graft a robot to a reasoning program, we wouldn't need a person to provide the meaning anymore: it would come from the physical world."
- Brain simulator reply: What if the program simulates the sequence of nerve firings at the synapses of an actual brain of an actual Chinese speaker? The man in the room would be simulating an actual brain. This is a variation on the "systems reply" that appears more plausible because "the system" now clearly operates like a human brain, which strengthens the intuition that there is something besides the man in the room that could understand Chinese.
- Other minds reply and the epiphenomena reply: Several people have noted that Searle's argument is just a version of the problem of other minds, applied to machines. Since it is difficult to decide if people are "actually" thinking, we should not be surprised that it is difficult to answer the same question about machines.

A related question is whether "consciousness" (as Searle understands it) exists. Searle argues that the experience of consciousness cannot be detected by examining the behavior of a machine, a human being or any other animal. Daniel Dennett points out that natural selection cannot preserve a feature of an animal that has no effect on the behavior of the animal, and thus consciousness (as Searle understands it) cannot be produced by natural selection. Therefore, either natural selection did not produce consciousness, or "strong AI" is correct in that consciousness can be detected by suitably designed Turing test.

== Is thinking a kind of computation? ==
The computational theory of mind or "computationalism" claims that the relationship between mind and brain is similar (if not identical) to the relationship between a running program (software) and a computer (hardware). The idea has philosophical roots in Hobbes (who claimed reasoning was "nothing more than reckoning"), Leibniz (who attempted to create a logical calculus of all human ideas), Hume (who thought perception could be reduced to "atomic impressions") and even Kant (who analyzed all experience as controlled by formal rules). The latest version is associated with philosophers Hilary Putnam and Jerry Fodor.

This question bears on our earlier questions: if the human brain is a kind of computer then computers can be both intelligent and conscious, answering both the practical and philosophical questions of AI. In terms of the practical question of AI ("Can a machine display general intelligence?"), some versions of computationalism make the claim that (as Hobbes wrote):

- Reasoning is nothing but reckoning.

In other words, our intelligence derives from a form of calculation, similar to arithmetic. This is the physical symbol system hypothesis discussed above, and it implies that artificial intelligence is possible. In terms of the philosophical question of AI ("Can a machine have mind, mental states and consciousness?"), most versions of computationalism claim that (as Stevan Harnad characterizes it):

- Mental states are just implementations of (the right) computer programs.

This is John Searle's "strong AI" discussed above, and it is the real target of the Chinese room argument (according to Harnad).

== Other related questions ==
=== Can a machine have emotions? ===
If "emotions" are defined only in terms of their effect on behavior or on how they function inside an organism, then emotions can be viewed as a mechanism that an intelligent agent uses to maximize the utility of its actions. Given this definition of emotion, Hans Moravec believes that "robots in general will be quite emotional about being nice people". Fear is a source of urgency. Empathy is a necessary component of good human computer interaction. He says robots "will try to please you in an apparently selfless manner because it will get a thrill out of this positive reinforcement. You can interpret this as a kind of love." Daniel Crevier writes "Moravec's point is that emotions are just devices for channeling behavior in a direction beneficial to the survival of one's species."

=== Can a machine be self-aware? ===
"Self-awareness", as noted above, is sometimes used by science fiction writers as a name for the essential human property that makes a character fully human. Turing strips away all other properties of human beings and reduces the question to "can a machine be the subject of its own thought?" Can it think about itself? Viewed in this way, a program can be written that can report on its own internal states, such as a debugger.

=== Can a machine be original or creative? ===
Turing reduces this to the question of whether a machine can "take us by surprise" and argues that this is obviously true, as any programmer can attest. He notes that, with enough storage capacity, a computer can behave in an astronomical number of different ways. It must be possible, even trivial, for a computer that can represent ideas to combine them in new ways. (Douglas Lenat's Automated Mathematician, as one example, combined ideas to discover new mathematical truths.) Kaplan and Haenlein suggest that machines can display scientific creativity, while it seems likely that humans will have the upper hand where artistic creativity is concerned.

In 2009, scientists at Aberystwyth University in Wales and the U.K's University of Cambridge designed a robot called Adam that they believe to be the first machine to independently come up with new scientific findings. Also in 2009, researchers at Cornell developed Eureqa, a computer program that extrapolates formulas to fit the data inputted, such as finding the laws of motion from a pendulum's motion.

=== Can a machine be benevolent or hostile? ===
This question (like many others in the philosophy of artificial intelligence) can be presented in two forms. "Hostility" can be defined in terms function or behavior, in which case "hostile" becomes synonymous with "dangerous". Or it can be defined in terms of intent: can a machine "deliberately" set out to do harm? The latter is the question "can a machine have conscious states?" (such as intentions) in another form.

The question of whether highly intelligent and completely autonomous machines would be dangerous has been examined in detail by futurists (such as the Machine Intelligence Research Institute). The obvious element of drama has also made the subject popular in science fiction, which has considered many differently possible scenarios where intelligent machines pose a threat to mankind; see Artificial intelligence in fiction.

One issue is that machines may acquire the autonomy and intelligence required to be dangerous very quickly. Vernor Vinge has suggested that over just a few years, computers will suddenly become thousands or millions of times more intelligent than humans. He calls this "the Singularity". He suggests that it may be somewhat or possibly very dangerous for humans. This is discussed by a philosophy called Singularitarianism.

In 2009, academics and technical experts attended a conference to discuss the potential impact of robots and computers and the impact of the hypothetical possibility that they could become self-sufficient and able to make their own decisions. They discussed the possibility and the extent to which computers and robots might be able to acquire any level of autonomy, and to what degree they could use such abilities to possibly pose any threat or hazard. They noted that some machines have acquired various forms of semi-autonomy, including being able to find power sources on their own and being able to independently choose targets to attack with weapons. They also noted that some computer viruses can evade elimination and have achieved "cockroach intelligence". They noted that self-awareness as depicted in science-fiction is probably unlikely, but that there were other potential hazards and pitfalls.

Some experts and academics have questioned the use of robots for military combat, especially when such robots are given some degree of autonomous functions. The US Navy has funded a report which indicates that as military robots become more complex, there should be greater attention to implications of their ability to make autonomous decisions.

The President of the Association for the Advancement of Artificial Intelligence has commissioned a study to look at this issue. They point to programs like the Language Acquisition Device which can emulate human interaction.

Some have suggested a need to build "Friendly AI", a term coined by Eliezer Yudkowsky, meaning that the advances which are already occurring with AI should also include an effort to make AI intrinsically friendly and humane.

=== Can a machine imitate all human characteristics? ===
Turing said "It is customary ... to offer a grain of comfort, in the form of a statement that some peculiarly human characteristic could never be imitated by a machine. ... I cannot offer any such comfort, for I believe that no such bounds can be set."

Turing noted that there are many arguments of the form "a machine will never do X", where X can be many things, such as:

Be kind, resourceful, beautiful, friendly, have initiative, have a sense of humor, tell right from wrong, make mistakes, fall in love, enjoy strawberries and cream, make someone fall in love with it, learn from experience, use words properly, be the subject of its own thought, have as much diversity of behaviour as a man, do something really new.

Turing argues that these objections are often based on naive assumptions about the versatility of machines or are "disguised forms of the argument from consciousness". Writing a program that exhibits one of these behaviors "will not make much of an impression." All of these arguments are tangential to the basic premise of AI, unless it can be shown that one of these traits is essential for general intelligence.

=== Theological argument ===
According to Turing, the argument that "thinking is a function of man's immortal soul" is "the theological objection". He writes:

In attempting to construct such machines we should not be irreverently usurping His power of creating souls, any more than we are in the procreation of children: rather we are, in either case, instruments of His will providing mansions for the souls that He creates.

== Views on the role of philosophy ==
In the Stanford Encyclopedia of Philosophy, some scholars argue that the role of philosophy in AI is underappreciated, and some argue that the AI community's dismissal of philosophy is even detrimental to their own field. Physicist David Deutsch argues that without an understanding of philosophy or its concepts, AI development would suffer from a lack of progress.

== Conferences and literature ==
The main conference series on the issue is "Philosophy and Theory of AI" (PT-AI), run by Vincent C. Müller.

The main bibliography on the subject, with several sub-sections, is on PhilPapers.

A recent survey for Philosophy of AI is Müller (2025).

== See also ==
- AI takeover
- Artificial brain
- Artificial consciousness
- Artificial intelligence
- Artificial neural network
- Chatbot
- Computational theory of mind
- Computing Machinery and Intelligence
- Existential risk from artificial general intelligence
- Functionalism
- Hubert Dreyfus's views on artificial intelligence
- Multi-agent system
- Philosophy of computer science
- Philosophy of information
- Philosophy of mind
- Physical symbol system
- Simulated reality
- Superintelligence: Paths, Dangers, Strategies
- Synthetic intelligence
- Wireheading
