= Neuro-symbolic AI =

Subfield of artificial intelligence

Neuro-symbolic AI describes a relatively newer approach to artificial intelligence that combines neural networks and symbolic AI approaches, such as knowledge representation and automated reasoning, to create more robust, more reliable, and more trustworthy AI. This combination allows statistical patterns to be combined with explicitly defined rules and knowledge to give AI systems the ability to better represent, reason and generalize. Thus, neuro-symbolic AI provides a reasoning infrastructure to state-of-the-art machine learning for solving a wider range of problems more effectively.

Neuro-symbolic AI recognises the value of deep learning as the “substrate” of AI that provides efficient computational models of learning from data. At the same time, it seeks to address deep learning’s main limitations: lack of reliability, data and energy efficiency, fairness, and trust. Thus, neuro-symbolic AI is argued to leverage the strengths of the two predominant approaches to AI, at the same time mitigating their weaknesses. Many leading computer scientists support this view. For example, Leslie Valiant believes that neuro-symbolic AI will be able to "reconcile the statistical nature of learning and the logical nature of reasoning," while Sepp Hochreiter claims that "the most promising approach to a broad AI is a neuro-symbolic AI, that is, a bilateral AI that combines methods from symbolic and sub-symbolic AI."

In recent years, neuro-symbolic AI has been called the third wave of AI, where the first wave (1980s–2000s) was the era of logic-based symbolic AI, and the second wave (2015–present) relied on connectionist AI, that is, neural networks and deep learning. Neuro-symbolic AI gained wider industrial adoption and public visibility in 2025 to address hallucination in large language models (LLMs); for example, Amazon applied it in its Vulcan warehouse robots and Rufus AI shopping assistant to enhance accuracy and decision-making.

To date, no single predominant approach exists for how to achieve neuro-symbolic AI. Research in the field is focused on what makes the best way to assemble the two main AI paradigms into one architecture, the neuro-symbolic methodology to do so, appropriate metrics such as "accuracy divided by compute" to account for data efficiency requirements and knowledge reuse, the representation capacity of neural models of computation, the principled combination of learning and reasoning using the interplay of continuous and discrete processes, and applications of neuro-symbolic AI in domain-specific fields. Overall, however, neuro-symbolic AI systems can be divided into two main categories:

- hybrid systems with a neural and a symbolic component (e.g., LLMs and Theorem Provers as in AlphaProof Nexus system by Google DeepMind, which was able to prove several open Erdős problems), and
- neuro-symbolic systems integrating learning and reasoning within a neural network, so that, informed by the theory of learning and formal reasoning under uncertainty, these systems are normally based on fuzzy and non-classical logics or probabilistic methods made differentiable for use within neural networks.

== Relationship to other fields ==
=== Cognitive science ===
Neuro-symbolic AI is largely inspired by human's cognitive abilities and the idea of world models, and this is related to cognitive science. Daniel Kahneman's book Thinking, Fast and Slow describes cognition as encompassing two components: System 1 is fast, reflexive, intuitive, while System 2 is slower, deliberative, explicit. System 1 "knows language" and is used for pattern recognition. System 2 handles planning and long-term decision making. Borrowing the System 1–System 2 view of cognition into AI, deep learning is best suited to handling the first kind of cognitive system, while symbolic AI deals with the second kind. Both kinds are needed for a robust, reliable AI to learn efficiently but also reason reliably, interact safely with humans, accept advice and answer questions correctly even when only very few observations are available. Such dual-process models with explicit reference to the two contrasting systems have been worked on since the 1990s, both in AI and in cognitive science, by multiple researchers.

As another example of AI borrowing from cognitive science, Gary Marcus argued that "We cannot construct rich cognitive models in an adequate, automated way without the triumvirate of hybrid architecture, rich prior knowledge, and sophisticated techniques for reasoning." Further, "To build a robust, knowledge-driven approach to AI we must have the machinery of symbol manipulation in our toolkit. Too much of useful knowledge is abstract to make do without tools that represent and manipulate abstraction, and to date, the only known machinery that can manipulate such abstract knowledge reliably is the apparatus of symbol manipulation." This echoes earlier calls for hybrid models as early as the 1990s.

=== Artificial general intelligence ===
Neuro-symbolic AI is claimed to offer an alternative path to Artificial general intelligence (AGI). By adopting the methodology known as the neuro-symbolic cycle, where a neural network is trained continually while being checked for its reasoning capabilities, neuro-symbolic AI promises to achieve network compression via knowledge reuse. This is the opposite of the usual scaling-up of deep learning, which, for example, is the reason behind the vast energy use requirements of LLMs.

== Approaches ==
Approaches for integration neural and symbolic AI methods are diverse. Besides the coarse distinction between hybrid and integrated neuro-symbolic systems, there are other, more fine-grained classifications. For example, a prominent Henry Kautz's taxonomy of neurosymbolic architectures is as follows, along with some representative examples:

- Symbolic Neuro symbolic is the current approach of many neural models in natural language processing, where words or subword tokens are the ultimate input and output of large language models. Examples include BERT and GPT-3.
- Symbolic[Neuro] is a hybrid architecture where symbolic techniques are used to invoke neural techniques. It is exemplified by AlphaGo, where the symbolic approach is Monte Carlo tree search and the neural techniques learn how to evaluate game positions.
- Neural | Symbolic uses a neural architecture to interpret perceptual data as symbols and relationships that are further reasoned about symbolically; Neural-Concept Learner is one example of such a system and Google DeepMind's AlphaProof Nexus is another.
- Neuro: Symbolic → Neuro relies on symbolic reasoning to generate or label training data that is subsequently learned by a deep learning model. For example, one can train a neural model for symbolic computation by using a Macsyma-like symbolic mathematics system to create or label examples.
- Neural_{Symbolic} integrates a neural net by generating it from symbolic rules. Examples include the Neural Theorem Prover, which constructs a neural network from an AND-OR proof tree generated from knowledge base rules and terms, and Logic Tensor Networks (LTNs).
- Neural[Symbolic] embeds symbolic reasoning inside a neural network, aiming to enable neuro and combinatorial reasoning together. The work on connectionist modal and temporal logics by Garcez, Lamb and Gabbay is aligned with this approach.

These categories are not exhaustive; for example, they do not consider multi-agent systems. In 2005, Bader and Hitzler presented a more fine-grained categorization that considered, e.g., whether the use of symbols included non-trivial logic and, if it did, whether the logic was propositional or first-order logic. This categorization is compared with Kautz's taxonomy in 2021 by Sarker.

Recently, Sepp Hochreiter argued that Graph Neural Networks (GNNs) "...are the predominant models of neural-symbolic computing" since "[t]hey describe the properties of molecules, simulate social networks, or predict future states in physical and engineering applications with particle-particle interactions."

== History ==
=== Early systems ===
D'Avila Garcez and Lamb described research in the area of neuro-symbolic AI as ongoing at least since the 1990s, when an initial set of workshops on this topic were organised. However, it could be argued that the field of neuro-symbolic AI started together with connectionism itself in 1943 with McCulloch and Pitts aptly titled their paper, which is widely accepted as having started the field of neural networks, A Logical Calculus of the Ideas Immanent in Nervous Activity. Then, John von Neumann’s 1952 paper Lectures on Probabilistic Logics and the Synthesis of Reliable Organisms from Unreliable Components investigated the interplay between discrete and continuous processes in computer science. Even Alan Turing’s famous work Intelligent Machinery from 1948 also introduced a type of neural network called a B-type machine. All of this happened even before the term Artificial Intelligence was coined by John McCarthy in 1956 and the subsequent separation of the field in two, symbolic and sub-symbolic (i.e., neural) AI, with their separate conferences, journals and associations. The proponents of neuro-symbolic AI argue that the field should never have been separated in two.

In the 1980’s, inspired by the promise of parallel computation, a group of researchers sought to use neural networks not for learning from data but for parallel theorem proving, which resulted in the CHCL system of S. Hoelldobler and related approaches. Others in Machine Learning were interested in incorporating symbolic knowledge into neural networks. The KBANN system of Towell and Shavlik from 1994 was the first to experiment with the insertion and extraction of Horn clause rules from neural networks. The first neuro-symbolic system combining backpropagation with logic programming was the CILP system of Garcez and Zaverucha from 1999.

=== The modern times ===
In the mid-2010s, neuro-symbolic AI experienced a significant revival. A series of workshops on neuro-symbolic AI, originally titled International Workshop on Neural-Symbolic Learning and Reasoning was held yearly since 2005 and has recently been converted into a conference series International Conference on Neurosymbolic Learning and Reasoning (NeSy). The first academic journal dedicated exclusively to the field, the Neurosymbolic AI journal, IOS Press, was created in 2023 with editors-in-chief Pascal Hitzler, Artur d'Avila Garcez and Tarek R. Besold.

Since 2015, the deep learning revolution proved the promise of connectionist methods. By making use of differentiable programming, researchers started to combine differentiable symbolic and connectionist systems (neural networks), inspired by the field of statistical relational learning; prominent examples of such combinations are LTNs and DeepProbLog.

Since 2020, interest in neuro-symbolic AI has surged much further with the rise of foundation models such as LLMs highlighting the limitations of pure neural networks, such as hallucinations, lack of understanding of the mechanisms behind sudden variations in performance, and lack of sound reasoning or poor systematic generalization beyond training data distributions. As a response, hybrid LLMs with symbolic tools started to appear, which combine LLMs with theorem provers, logic verifiers or proof assistants, functional programming, databases and logic programs. This is one of the first times that neuro-symbolic AI has seen a significant industry adoption in companies such as Amazon (Vulcan and Rufus AI), Google (AlphaGeometry) and Anthropic (Claude Code).

Most contemporary neuro-symbolic systems use prior knowledge in various forms added to either the architecture or the loss function of a neural network, which is different from chain-of-thought prompting currently popular in LLM usage. The training of the neural part of these neuro-symbolic symtems is typically supervised and carried out using backpropagation; however, there exist notable exceptions, which use unsupervised or contrastive learning and energy-based models. Following network training, the task of knowledge extraction derives symbolic descriptions from (parts of) the trained network. Neuro-symbolic knowledge extraction is closely related to the field of Explainable AI and Argumentation. Knowledge extraction is the main bottleneck computationally for the realization of neuro-symbolic AI in practice and at large scale. From a neuro-symbolic theory perspective, the main research question is representational: what are the forms of symbolic knowledge that can be represented by what types of neural networks (transformers, graph neural networks, diffusion models)?

== See also ==
- Symbolic AI
- Connectionist AI
- Hybrid intelligent systems
