= Turing's Wager =

Turing's Wager is a philosophical argument that claims it is impossible to infer or deduce a detailed mathematical model of the human brain within a reasonable timescale, and thus impossible in any practical sense. The argument was first given in 1950 by the computational theorist Alan Turing in his paper Computing Machinery and Intelligence, published in Mind (Turing 1950, p. 453). The argument asserts that determining any mathematical model of a computer (its source code or any isomorphic equivalent such as a Turing machine or virtual simulation) is not possible in a reasonable timeframe. As a consequence, determining a mathematical model of the human brain (which is, by its nature, more complicated) must also be impossible within that timeframe.

== Effect of modern technology on the wager ==
It has been argued that modern neuroimaging techniques will allow researchers to create accurate simulations of the human mind within the 21st century (Kurzweil 2012; Markram 2012, Fildes 2009), thereby overcoming the wager. Others have argued that such claims are unjustified (Thwaites et al. 2017).

== Relationship between Turing's Wager and the Turing Test ==
The Turing Test attempts to define when a machine might be said to possess human intelligence, while Turing's Wager is an argument aiming to demonstrate that characterising the brain mathematically will take over a thousand years. While building an artificial intelligence and mapping the human brain are both difficult endeavours, the former is actually a sub-problem of the latter (Thwaites et al. 2017).

== Alternative use in AI ethics ==
In contemporary philosophical literature, the phrase "Turing's Wager" has also been adapted independently of Turing's original mathematical argument to describe a pragmatic framework regarding machine consciousness and moral status, drawing an analogy to Pascal's Wager. Philosophers like David Chalmers argue that because it is impossible to verify whether an AI possesses genuine internal understanding (as debated in John Searle's Chinese Room) or is merely simulating it, society faces an ethical dilemma. Even if there is only a small probability that an AI has subjective experiences, the moral stakes of being wrong mean society must default to treating them as conscious subjects (Chalmers 2022).

Under this ethical formulation of the wager, if an artificial entity behaves as though it possesses sentience or the capacity to suffer, humans are morally obligated to treat it as a moral subject. Proponents of this view argue that the severe moral cost of accidentally mistreating a truly conscious entity vastly outweighs the minor cost of mistakenly granting ethical considerations to a non-conscious machine (Schwitzgebel & Garza 2015).
