= Weak artificial intelligence =

Form of artificial intelligence

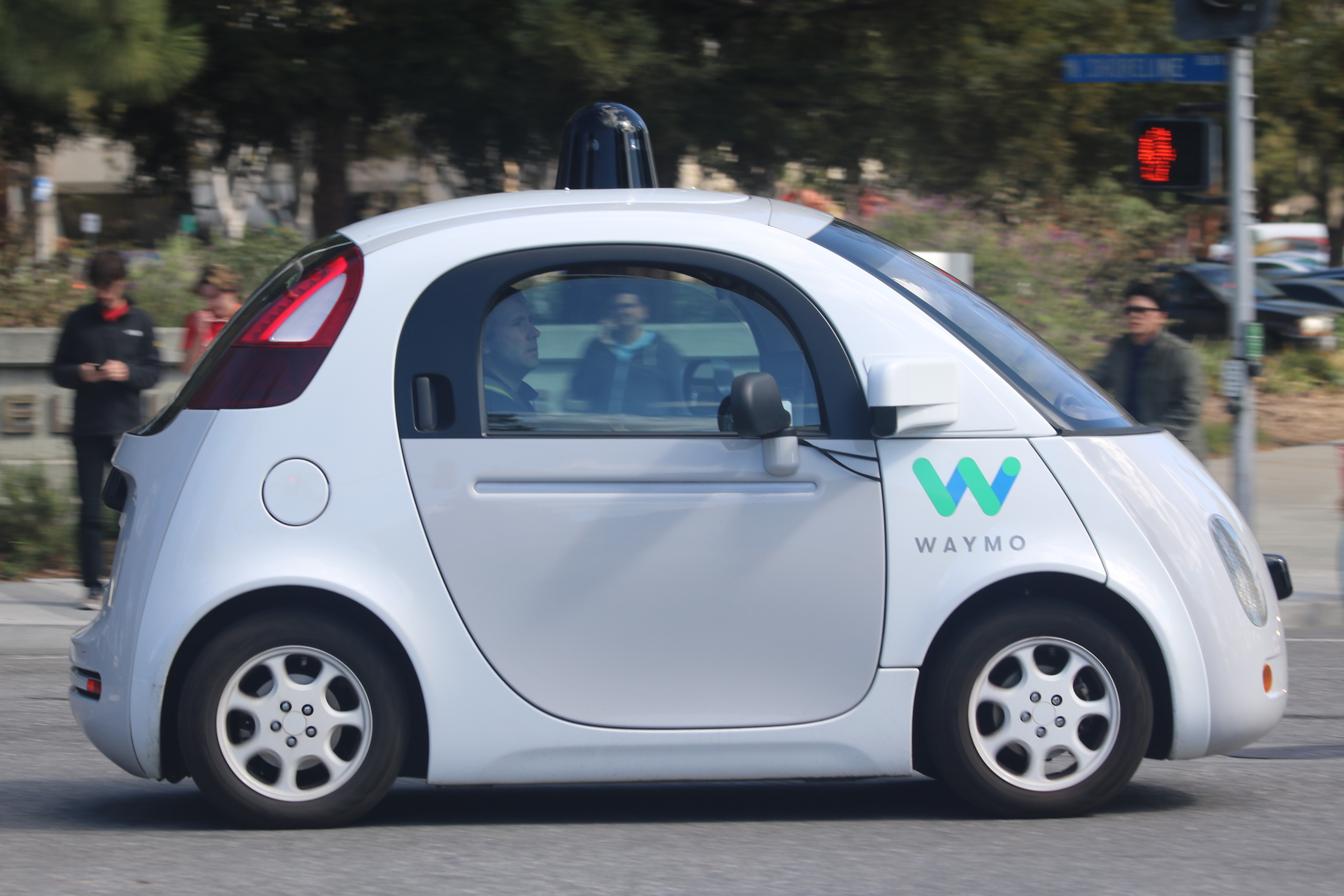
Self-driving cars, such as the Waymo car pictured above, utilise weak AI.

Weak artificial intelligence (weak AI) is artificial intelligence that implements a limited part of the mind, or, as narrow AI, artificial narrow intelligence (ANI), is focused on one narrow task.

Weak AI is contrasted with strong AI, which can be interpreted in various ways:

- Artificial general intelligence (AGI): a machine with the ability to apply intelligence to any problem, rather than just one specific problem.
- Artificial superintelligence (ASI): a machine with a vastly superior intelligence to the average human being.
- Artificial consciousness: a machine that has consciousness, sentience and mind (John Searle uses "strong AI" in this sense).

Narrow AI can be classified as being "limited to a single, narrowly defined task. Most modern AI systems would be classified in this category." Artificial general intelligence is conversely the opposite.

== Applications and risks ==
Some examples of narrow AI are AlphaGo, self-driving cars, robot systems used in the medical field, and diagnostic doctors. Narrow AI systems are sometimes dangerous if unreliable. And the behavior that it follows can become inconsistent. It could be difficult for the AI to grasp complex patterns and get to a solution that works reliably in various environments. This "brittleness" can cause it to fail in unpredictable ways.

Narrow AI failures can sometimes have significant consequences. It could for example cause disruptions in the electric grid, damage nuclear power plants, cause global economic problems, and misdirect autonomous vehicles. Medicines could be incorrectly sorted and distributed. Also, medical diagnoses can ultimately have serious and sometimes deadly consequences if the AI is faulty or biased.

Simple AI programs have already worked their way into society, oftentimes unnoticed by the public. Autocorrection for typing, speech recognition for speech-to-text programs, and vast expansions in the data science fields are examples. Narrow AI has also been the subject of some controversy, including resulting in unfair prison sentences, discrimination against women in the workplace for hiring, resulting in death via autonomous driving, among other cases.

Despite being "narrow" AI, recommender systems are efficient at predicting user reactions based on their posts, patterns, or trends. For instance, TikTok's "For You" algorithm can determine a user's interests or preferences in less than an hour. Some other social media AI systems are used to detect bots that may be involved in propaganda or other potentially malicious activities.

== Weak AI versus strong AI ==
John Searle contests the possibility of strong AI (by which he means conscious AI). He further believes that the Turing test (created by Alan Turing and originally called the "imitation game", used to assess whether a machine can converse indistinguishably from a human) is not accurate or appropriate for testing whether an AI is "strong".

Scholars such as Antonio Lieto have argued that the current research on both AI and cognitive modelling are perfectly aligned with the weak-AI hypothesis (that should not be confused with the "general" vs "narrow" AI distinction) and that the popular assumption that cognitively inspired AI systems espouse the strong AI hypothesis is ill-posed and problematic since "artificial models of brain and mind can be used to understand mental phenomena without pretending that that they are the real phenomena that they are modelling" (as, on the other hand, implied by the strong AI assumption).

== See also ==
- Artificial intelligence – Intelligence in machines
- Artificial general intelligence – Type of hypothetical AI with wide-ranging abilities
- Deep learning – Branch of machine learning
- Expert system – Computer system emulating human expert
- Hardware for artificial intelligence – Hardware specially designed and optimized for artificial intelligence
- History of artificial intelligence
- Machine learning – Subset of artificial intelligence
- Philosophy of artificial intelligence – Branch of philosophy
- Synthetic intelligence – Alternative term for artificial intelligence
- Virtual assistant – Software agent
- Workplace impact of artificial intelligence
