= Hubert Dreyfus =

American philosopher

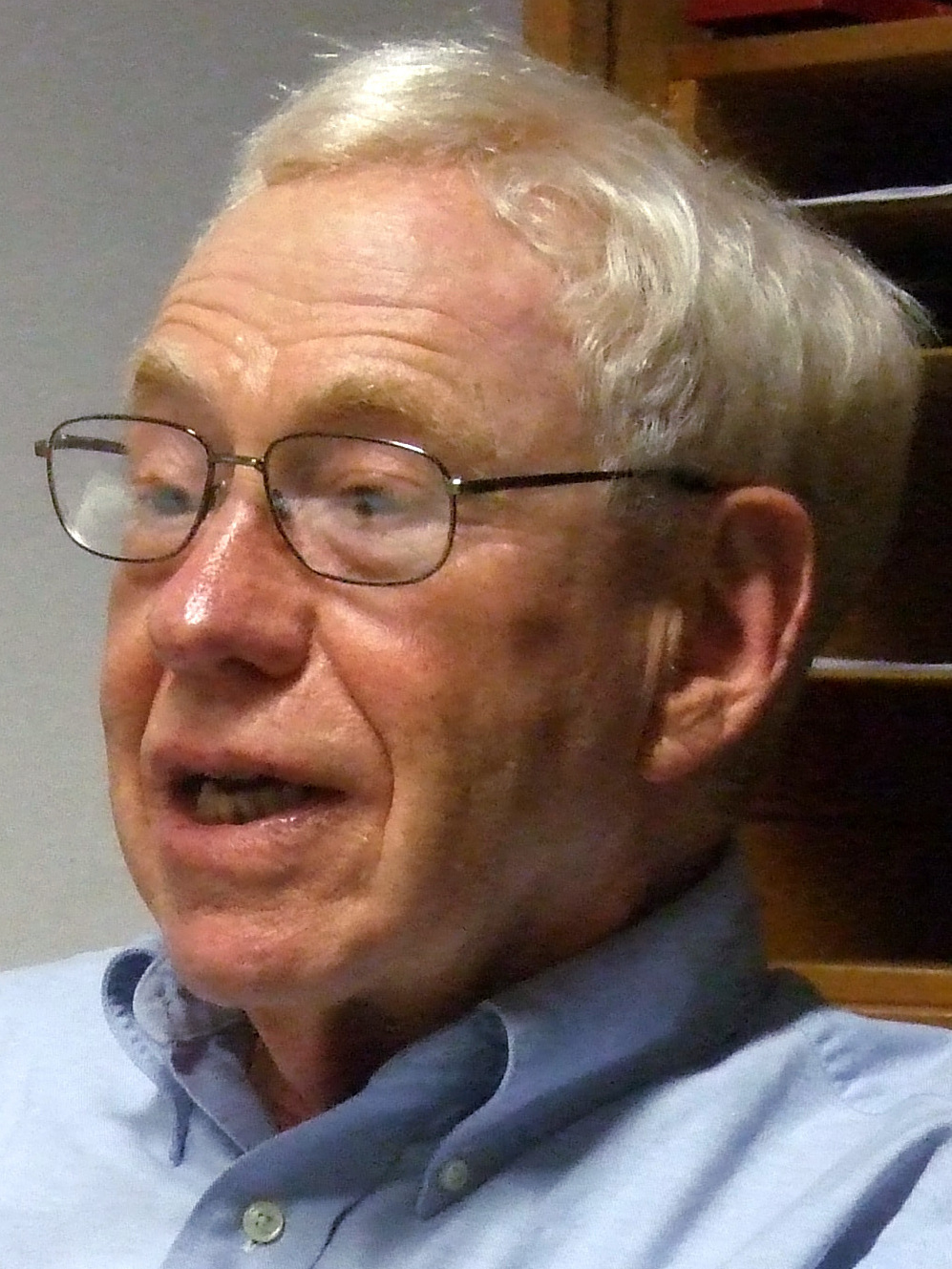
- Dreyfus in 2011
- Born: Hubert Lederer Dreyfus; October 15, 1929; Terre Haute, Indiana, US
- Died: April 22, 2017 (aged 87); Berkeley, California, US
- Spouse: Geneviève Boissier-Dreyfus
- Relatives: Stuart Dreyfus (brother)

Education
- Education: Harvard University (BA, MA, PhD); University of Freiburg; École Normale Supérieure
- Thesis: Husserl's Phenomenology of Perception (1964)
- Academic advisors: Dagfinn Føllesdal; Willard Van Orman Quine

Philosophical work
- Era: Contemporary philosophy
- Region: Western philosophy
- School: Continental philosophy; phenomenology; existentialism
- Institutions: Massachusetts Institute of Technology; University of California, Berkeley
- Doctoral students: Fernando Flores; Charles Guignon; Mark Wrathall
- Notable students: Eric Kaplan; Tao Ruspoli
- Main interests: Philosophy of literature; philosophy of psychology; philosophy of artificial intelligence
- Notable ideas: Dreyfus' critique of artificial intelligence; postcognitivism; Martin Heidegger's hermeneutic realism

Hubert Lederer Dreyfus (/ˈdraɪfəs/ DRY-fəs; October 15, 1929 – April 22, 2017) was an American philosopher and a professor of philosophy at the University of California, Berkeley. His main interests included phenomenology, existentialism and the philosophy of both psychology and literature, as well as the philosophical implications of artificial intelligence. He was widely known for his exegesis of Martin Heidegger, which critics labeled "Dreydegger".

Dreyfus was featured in Tao Ruspoli's film Being in the World (2010), and was among the philosophers interviewed by Bryan Magee for the BBC Television series The Great Philosophers (1987).

The Futurama character Professor Hubert Farnsworth is partly named after him, writer Eric Kaplan having been a former student.

== Life and career ==
Dreyfus was born on 15 October 1929, in Terre Haute, Indiana, to Stanley S. and Irene (Lederer) Dreyfus.

He attended Harvard University from 1947. With a senior honors thesis on Causality and Quantum Theory (for which W. V. O. Quine was the main examiner) he was awarded a B.A. summa cum laude in 1951 and joined Phi Beta Kappa. He was awarded a M.A. in 1952. He was a Teaching Fellow at Harvard from 1952 to 1953 (as he was again in 1954 and 1956). Then, on a Harvard Sheldon traveling fellowship, Dreyfus studied at the University of Freiburg from 1953 to 1954. During this time he had an interview with Martin Heidegger. Sean D. Kelly records that Dreyfus found the meeting 'disappointing.' A brief mention of it was made by Dreyfus during his 1987 BBC interview with Bryan Magee in remarks that are revealing of both his and Heidegger's opinion of the work of Jean-Paul Sartre.

Between 1956 and 1957, Dreyfus undertook research at the Husserl Archives at the University of Louvain on a Fulbright Fellowship. Towards the end of his stay, his first (jointly authored) paper "Curds and Lions in Don Quijote" would appear in print. After acting as an instructor in philosophy at Brandeis University (1957–1959), he attended the École Normale Supérieure on a French government grant (1959–1960).

From 1960, first as an instructor, then as an assistant and then associate professor, Dreyfus taught philosophy at the Massachusetts Institute of Technology (MIT). In 1964, with his dissertation Husserl's Phenomenology of Perception, he obtained his Ph.D. from Harvard. (Due to his knowledge of Husserl, Dagfinn Føllesdal sat on the thesis committee but he has asserted that Dreyfus "was not really my student.") That same year, his co-translation (with his first wife) of Sense and Non-Sense by Maurice Merleau-Ponty was published.

Also in 1964, and whilst still at MIT, he was employed as a consultant by the RAND Corporation to review the work of Allen Newell and Herbert A. Simon in the field of artificial intelligence (AI). This resulted in the publication, in 1965, of the "famously combative" Alchemy and Artificial Intelligence, which proved to be the first of a series of papers and books attacking the AI field's claims and assumptions. The first edition of What Computers Can't Do would follow in 1972, and this critique of AI (which has been translated into at least ten languages) would establish Dreyfus's public reputation. However, as the editors of his Festschrift noted: "the study and interpretation of 'continental' philosophers... came first in the order of his philosophical interests and influences."

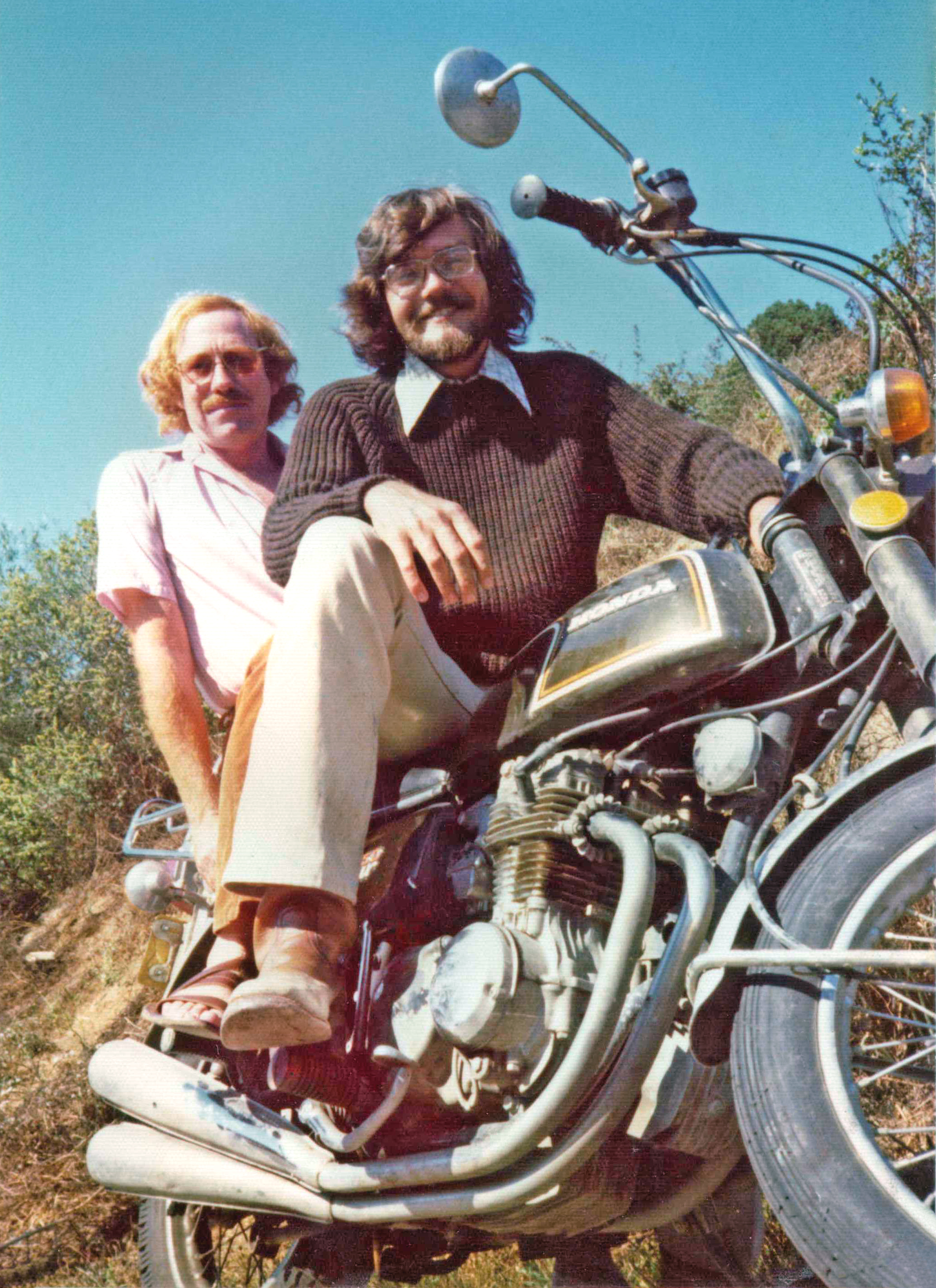
Dreyfus (left) outside his Berkeley home in 1976

=== Berkeley ===
In 1968, although he had been granted tenure, Dreyfus left MIT and became an associate professor of philosophy at the University of California, Berkeley, (winning, that same year, the Harbison Prize for Outstanding Teaching). In 1972 he was promoted to full professor. Though Dreyfus retired from his chair in 1994, he continued as professor of philosophy in the Graduate School (and held, from 1999, a joint appointment in the rhetoric department). He continued to teach philosophy at UC Berkeley until his last class in December 2016.

Dreyfus was elected a fellow of the American Academy of Arts and Sciences in 2001. He was also awarded an honorary doctorate for "his brilliant and highly influential work in the field of artificial intelligence" and his interpretation of twentieth century continental philosophy by Erasmus University.

=== Personal Life ===
Dreyfus died at home in Berkeley on April 22, 2017. He is survived by his second wife, Geneviève Boissier-Dreyfus, their two children, and his younger brother Stuart Dreyfus, a professor emeritus of industrial engineering and operations research at the University of California, Berkeley.

== Dreyfus' criticism of AI ==
Dreyfus' critique of artificial intelligence (AI) concerns what he considers to be the four primary assumptions of AI research. The first two assumptions are what he calls the "biological" and "psychological" assumptions. The biological assumption is that the brain is analogous to computer hardware and the mind is analogous to computer software. The psychological assumption is that the mind works by performing discrete computations (in the form of algorithmic rules) on discrete representations or symbols.

Dreyfus claims that the plausibility of the psychological assumption rests on two others: the epistemological and ontological assumptions. The epistemological assumption is that all activity (either by animate or inanimate objects) can be formalized (mathematically) in the form of predictive rules or laws. The ontological assumption is that reality consists entirely of a set of mutually independent, atomic (indivisible) facts. It's because of the epistemological assumption that workers in the field argue that intelligence is the same as formal rule-following, and it's because of the ontological one that they argue that human knowledge consists entirely of internal representations of reality.

On the basis of these two assumptions, workers in the field claim that cognition is the manipulation of internal symbols by internal rules, and that, therefore, human behaviour is, to a large extent, context free (see contextualism). Therefore, a truly scientific psychology is possible, which will detail the 'internal' rules of the human mind, in the same way the laws of physics detail the 'external' laws of the physical world. However, it is this key assumption that Dreyfus denies. In other words, he argues that we cannot now (and never will be able to) understand our own behavior in the same way as we understand objects in, for example, physics or chemistry: that is, by considering ourselves as things whose behaviour can be predicted via 'objective', context free scientific laws. According to Dreyfus, a context-free psychology is a contradiction in terms.

Dreyfus's arguments against this position are taken from the phenomenological and hermeneutical tradition (especially the work of Martin Heidegger). Heidegger argued that, contrary to the cognitivist views (on which AI has been based), our being is in fact highly context-bound, which is why the two context-free assumptions are false. Dreyfus doesn't deny that we can choose to see human (or any) activity as being 'law-governed', in the same way that we can choose to see reality as consisting of indivisible atomic facts... if we wish. But it is a huge leap from that to state that because we want to or can see things in this way that it is therefore an objective fact that they are the case. In fact, Dreyfus argues that they are not (necessarily) the case, and that, therefore, any research program that assumes they are will quickly run into profound theoretical and practical problems. Therefore, the current efforts of workers in the field are doomed to failure.

Dreyfus argues that to get a device or devices with human-like intelligence would require them to have a human-like being-in-the-world and to have bodies more or less like ours, and social acculturation (i.e. a society) more or less like ours. (This view is shared by psychologists in the embodied psychology (Lakoff and Johnson 1999) and distributed cognition traditions. His opinions are similar to those of robotics researchers such as Rodney Brooks as well as researchers in the field of artificial life.)

Contrary to a popular misconception, Dreyfus never predicted that computers would never beat humans at chess. In Alchemy and Artificial Intelligence, he only reported (correctly) the state of the art of the time: "Still no chess program can play even amateur chess."

Daniel Crevier writes: "time has proven the accuracy and perceptiveness of some of Dreyfus's comments. Had he formulated them less aggressively, constructive actions they suggested might have been taken much earlier."

== Webcasting philosophy ==
When UC Berkeley and Apple began making a selected number of lecture classes freely available to the public as podcasts beginning around 2006, a recording of Dreyfus teaching a course called "Man, God, and Society in Western Literature – From Gods to God and Back" rose to the 58th most popular webcast on iTunes. These webcasts have attracted the attention of many, including non-academics, to Dreyfus and his subject area.

== Works ==
=== Books ===
- 1972. What Computers Can't Do: The Limits of Artificial Intelligence. ISBN 0-06-011082-1 (At Internet Archive)
  - 2nd edition 1979 ISBN 0-06-090613-8, ISBN 0-06-090624-3; 3rd edition 1992 re-titled as What Computers Still Can't Do ISBN 0-262-54067-3
- 1982. Husserl, intentionality, and cognitive science. Cambridge, Mass : MIT Press ISBN 0262040654
- 1983. (with Paul Rabinow) Michel Foucault: Beyond Structuralism and Hermeneutics. Chicago, Ill: The University of Chicago Press. ISBN 978-0-226-16312-3 (At Open Library)
- 1986 (with Stuart Dreyfus). Mind Over Machine: The Power of Human Intuition and Expertise in the Era of the Computer. New York: Free Press.(At Open Library)
- 1991. Being-in-the-World: A Commentary on Heidegger's Being and Time, Division I.Cambridge, Massachusetts: MIT Press. ISBN 0-262-54056-8, ISBN 978-0-262-54056-8
- 1992. What Computers Still Can't Do: A Critique of Artificial Reason. Cambridge, Massachusetts: MIT Press. ISBN 0-262-54067-3
- 1997, Disclosing New Worlds: Entrepreneurship, Democratic Action, and the Cultivation of Solidarity (co-author, with Fernando Flores and Charles Spinosa)
- 2001. On the Internet First Edition. London and New York: Routledge. ISBN 978-0-415-77516-8; 2nd edition 1979 (At Internet Archive)
- 2011. (with Sean Dorrance Kelly) All Things Shining: Reading the Western Classics to Find Meaning in a Secular Age. (At Open Library)
- 2014 Skillful Coping: Essays on the Phenomenology of Everyday Perception and Action, Mark A. Wrathall (ed.), ISBN 9780199654703
- 2015 (with Charles Taylor) Retrieving Realism. Harvard University Press, ISBN 9780198796220
- 2017 Background Practices: Essays on the Understanding of Being, Mark A. Wrathall (ed.), Oxford University Press, ISBN 9780198796220

=== Festschrift ===
- 2000. Heidegger, Authenticity, and Modernity: Essays in Honor of Hubert Dreyfus, Volume 1. Cambridge, Massachusetts: MIT Press. ISBN 0-262-73127-4.
- 2000. Heidegger, Coping, and Cognitive Science: Essays in Honor of Hubert L. Dreyfus, Volume 2. Cambridge, Massachusetts: MIT Press. ISBN 0-262-73128-2

=== Select articles ===
- 1965. "Alchemy and Artificial Intelligence". Rand Paper.

== See also ==
- Critique of technology

== Sources ==
Criticism of AI sources

- Crevier, Daniel (1993). AI: The Tumultuous Search for Artificial Intelligence. New York, NY: BasicBooks. ISBN 0-465-02997-3.
- George Lakoff and Mark Johnson, 1999. Philosophy in the Flesh: the Embodied Mind and its Challenge to Western Thought. Basic Books.
