= Daniel Crevier =

Canadian academic

Daniel Crevier (born 1947) is a Canadian entrepreneur and artificial intelligence and image processing researcher. He is also the author of AI: the Tumultuous History of the Search for Artificial Intelligence. In 1974 Crevier received a Ph.D. degree from Massachusetts Institute of Technology. In 1979 Crevier founded Coreco Imaging (COntractual REsearch COmpany), which was acquired by Dalsa in 2005.
