= Dneprov =

Dneprov is a surname. Notable people with the surname include:

- Anatoly Dneprov (writer) (1919–1975), Russian science fiction writer and physicist
- Anatoly Dneprov (singer) (1947–2008), Russian singer, composer, and lyricist
- Dneprov, a pen name of the Soviet politician Anatoly Lukyanov (1930–2019)
