= Anatoly Dneprov =

Anatoly Dneprov may refer to:

- Anatoly Dneprov (writer) (1919–1975), Soviet Ukrainian author
- Anatoly Dneprov (singer) (1947–2008), Soviet singer
