= Absent qualia =

Concept objecting to subjective, conscious experience

The concept of absent qualia is one of two major functionalist objections to the existence of qualia, the other being the inverted spectrum hypothesis. Qualia is a philosophical term used to refer to an individual's subjective experience, that is to say, the way something feels to that individual at that particular moment.

The central tenet of functionalism is that mental states (emotions, sensations, beliefs, etc.) are only a causal relationship between physical sensations, mental states (neurological states), and behavior. For example: John touches a hot stove, feels pain, and pulls back his hand. This is an example of a functionalist system. A functionalist would argue that attempting to insert the concept of qualia into this relationship creates an empty quality that has no actual physical relationship to anything. The "quale" in this example would be John's subjective sensation of his burned hand, how it feels to him at that moment to have a burned hand. The absent qualia hypothesis attempts to demonstrate why qualia such as this cannot exist.

Michael Tye characterizes the absent qualia hypothesis as, "the hypothesis that it could be the case that a system that functionally duplicates the mental states of a normal human being has no phenomenal consciousness (no qualia)." For example, if a machine, which could exactly duplicate the above scenario, was created and contained a computer system as complicated as John's neurological system, then it is logically possible that this system would have exactly the same reaction as John but lack consciousness, a prerequisite for subjective experience (qualia). A functionalist would argue that it must be the case that qualia would not be created in such a scenario, thus demonstrating that qualia cannot exist without conflicting with the fundamental tenets of Functionalism.

The absent qualia argument is a direct challenge to the functionalist view of the mind that claims that mental states can be defined only in terms of their functional roles, without any reference to the specific physical properties of the brain.

One of the main arguments against the absent qualia's point consists in denying the absence of qualia in non-human entities such as Ned Block's robot. Some functionalists argue that the robot does have qualia because it is supposed to have all of the functions of the brain. They say that since the absent qualia argument is based on an inclination, it doesn't have any proof of the absence of qualia in the robot, or any other entities such as the United States of America. The absent qualia argument is often criticised due to its abstractness.

== Examples ==
The zombie thought experiment is intended to challenge the functionalist view of the mind by highlighting the role of subjective experience in mental states. This experiment requires us to imagine a being that is functionally identical to a human being, in the sense that it behaves in exactly the same way as a human being and has the same mental states. However, unlike a human, it does not have any subjective experiences (qualia). This means that it is a being that behaves almost perfectly like a human, but lacks the subjective, qualitative character of conscious experience.

The China brain is another example, postulating that if we could possibly take each and every single inhabitant of China and give them a two way radio to communicate with, that would in terms create an artificial brain, comparable to having thousands of little men in your brain each signaling to each other.

With this thought experiment, functionalism, which claims that mental states can be defined only in terms of their functional roles without any reference to the specific physical properties of the brain, is incomplete as a theory of the mind. However, this view fails to account for the fact that mental states are always accompanied by subjective experiences. If a being can have the same mental states as a human, but without the subjective experiences, then the functionalist view is incomplete, failing to capture an essential aspect of mental states.

== See also ==
- Daniel Dennett's article "Quining Qualia" for a more extensive Functionalist argument against qualia.
- Kind, Amy. "The Absent Qualia Objection" 2020. Philosophy of mind: the basics. 86-92.
