= Samuel Bailey =

British philosopher, economist and writer

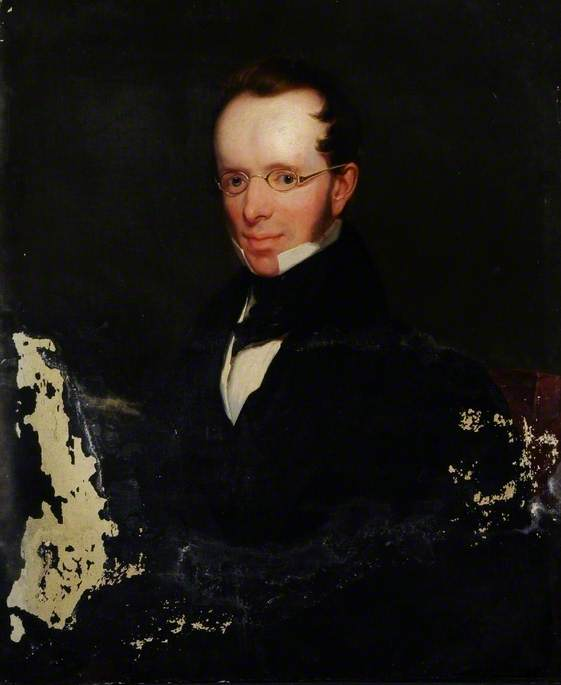
- Born: 5 July 1791; Dunstable, England
- Died: 18 January 1870 (aged 78); Sheffield, England
- Parent(s): Joseph Bailey (father); Mary Eadon (mother)

Philosophical work
- Era: 19th-century philosophy
- Region: Western Philosophy
- School: Utilitarianism, classical liberalism
- Main interests: Economics, political philosophy, inductive logic

Samuel Bailey (5 July 1791 – 18 January 1870) was a British philosopher, economist and writer. He was called the "Bentham of Hallamshire".

== Life ==
Bailey was born at Sheffield on 5 July 1791, the son of Joseph Bailey and Mary Eadon. His father was among the first of those Sheffield merchants who went to the United States to establish trade connections. After a few years in his father's business, he retired from all business concerns with an ample fortune, although he remained connected with the Sheffield Banking Company, of which he was a founder in 1831 and served as chairman for many years. Although an ardent liberal, he took little part in political affairs. On two occasions, he stood for Sheffield as a "philosophic radical" parliamentary candidate, but without success.

His life is for the most part a history of his numerous and varied publications. He died suddenly on 18 January 1870, leaving over £80,000 to the town trustees of Sheffield for public use.

== Thought ==
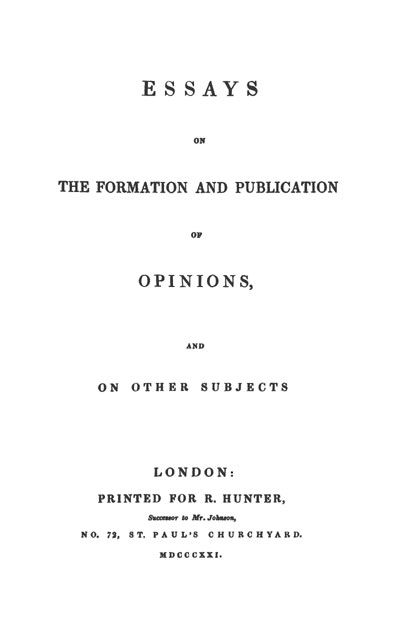
Title page: Essays on the Formation and Publication of Opinions 1st ed. (1821)

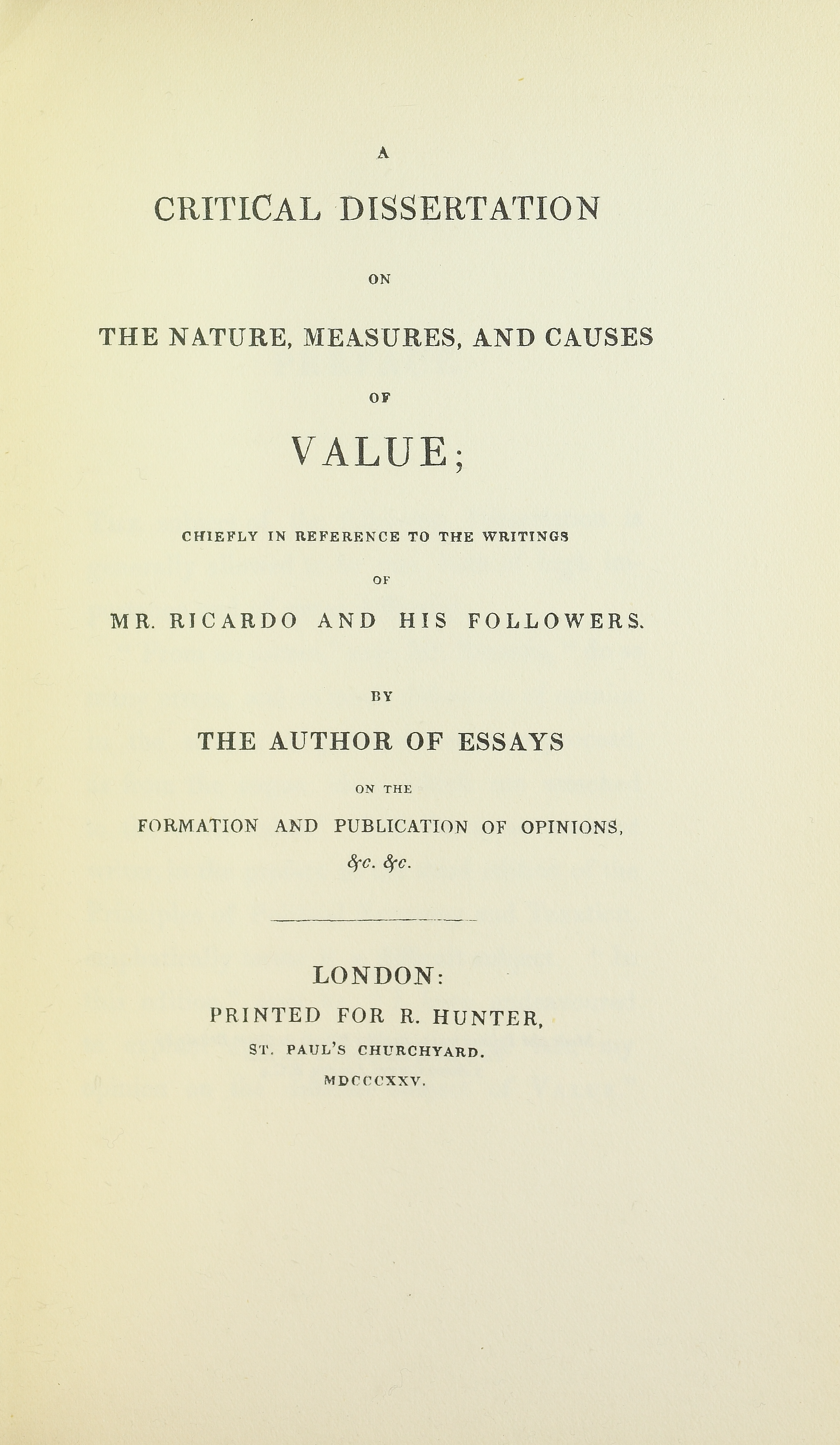
Critical dissertation on the nature, measures, and causes of value, 1931

His first work, Essays on the Formation and Publication of Opinions, published anonymously in 1821, attracted more attention than any of his other writings. A sequel to it appeared in 1829, Essays on the Pursuit of Truth. Between these two were Questions in Political Economy, Politics, Morals, &c. (1823), and a Critical Dissertation on the Nature, Measure, and Causes of Value (1825), directed against the opinions of David Ricardo and his school.

His next publications also were on economic or political subjects, Rationale of Political Representation (1835), and Money and its Vicissitudes (1837) and he has been regarded as one of the main theorists of Free banking. About the same time, there also appeared some of his pamphlets, Discussion of Parliamentary Reform, Right of Primogeniture Examined, Defence of Joint-Stock Banks. In 1842 appeared his Review of Berkeley's Theory of Vision which called forth rejoinders from John Stuart Mill in the Westminster Review and from James Frederick Ferrier in Blackwood's Magazine. Bailey replied to his critics in a Letter to a Philosopher (1843), &c.

In 1851 he published Theory of Reasoning, a discussion of the nature of inference, and an able criticism of the functions and value of the syllogism. In 1852 he published Discourses on Various Subjects; and finally summed up his philosophic views in the Letters on the Philosophy of the Human Mind (three series, 1855, 1858, 1863). The Letters contain a discussion of many of the principal problems in psychology and ethics. Bailey can hardly be classed as belonging either to the strictly empirical or to the idealist school, but his general tendency is towards the former.

In regard to method, he founds psychology entirely on introspection. He thus, to a certain extent, agrees with the Scottish School, but he differs from them in rejecting altogether the doctrine of mental faculties. What have been designated faculties are, upon his view, merely classified facts or phenomena of consciousness. He criticizes very severely the habitual use of metaphorical language in describing mental operations.

His doctrine of perception, which is, in brief, that "the perception of external things through the organs of sense is a direct mental act or phenomenon of consciousness not susceptible of being resolved into anything else," and the reality of which can be neither proved nor disproved, is not worked out in detail, but is supported by elaborate and sometimes subtle criticisms of all other theories. With regard to general and abstract ideas and general propositions, his opinions are those of the empirical school, but his analysis frequently puts the matter in a new light.

In the theory of morals, Bailey is an advocate of utilitarianism (though he objects to the term "utility" as being narrow and, to the unthinking, of sordid content), and works out with great skill the steps in the formation of the "complex" mental facts involved in the recognition of duty, obligation, right.

He bases all moral phenomena on five facts:

- Man is susceptible to pleasure (and pain);
- he likes (or dislikes) their causes;
- he desires to reciprocate pleasure and pain received;
- he expects such reciprocation from others;
- he feels more or less sympathy with the same feelings in his fellows (cf. Letters, 3rd series).

In 1845 he published Maro a poem in four cantos (85 pp., Longmans), containing a description of a young poet who printed 1000 copies of his first poem, of which only 10 were sold. He was a diligent student of Shakespeare, and his last literary work was On the Received Text of Shakespeare's Dramatic Writings and its Improvement (1862).

== Works ==
- Essays on the Formation and Publication of Opinions (1821). Google (NYPL) IA (UToronto)
  - 2nd edition, 1826. IA (UCal) Philadelphia, 1831. IA (UCal)
  - 3rd edition, 1837. Google (NYPL) Google (UMich) Boston, 1854. Google (NYPL) IA (UCal)
- Questions in Political Economy, Politics, Morals, Metaphysics, &c. (1823). Google (NYPL) IA (UToronto)
- A Critical Dissertation on the Nature, Measures, and Causes of Value (1825). Google (Harvard)
- A Letter to a Political Economist...on the Subject of Value (1826). [Pamphlet, 101 pp.] Google (Oxford) Google (UCal) IA (UCal) IA (UToronto)
- Essays on the Pursuit of Truth, &c. (1829). Google (Harvard) Google (Oxford) Philadelphia, 1831. Google (Harvard)
  - 2nd edition, 1844. Google (Oxford) IA (UCal)
- Discussion of Parliamentary Reform (1831). [Pamphlet, 55 pp.]
- The Rationale of Political Representation (1835). Google (NYPL) Google (Oxford) Google (Stanford) IA (UToronto)
- Right of Primogeniture Examined (1837). [Pamphlet, 60 pp.]
- Money and Its Vicissitudes in Value (1837). Google (UCal) IA (UCal)
- Defence of Joint-Stock Banks (1840). [Pamphlet, 100 pp.]
- A Review of Berkeley's Theory of Vision (1842). Google (Harvard) Google (UMich)
- Letter to a Philosopher in Reply to Some Recent Attempts to Vindicate &c. (1843). [Pamphlet, 68 pp.]
- Maro; or, Poetic irritability (1845). Google (Oxford)
- The Theory of Reasoning (1851). Google (UCal) IA (UCal) 2nd ed., 1852. Internet Archive
- Discourses on Various Subjects (1852). Google (Harvard) Google (Oxford) Google (UMich)
- Letters on the Philosophy of the Human Mind (1855–1863).
  - First series, 1855. Google (Harvard) Google (NYPL) Google (Oxford) IA (UToronto)
  - Second series, 1858. Google (NYPL) IA (UCal) IA (UToronto)
  - Third series, 1863. IA (UToronto)
- On the received text of Shakespeare's dramatic writings and its Improvement (1862–1866). 2 volumes.
  - Volume 1, 1862. Google (Oxford) IA (UToronto)
  - Volume 2, 1866. Google (Oxford)
