= William James Lectures =

Series of invited lectureships at Harvard University

The William James Lectures are a series of invited lectureships at Harvard University sponsored by the Departments of Philosophy and Psychology, who alternate in the selection of speakers. The series was created in honor of the American pragmatist philosopher and psychologist William James, a former faculty member at that institution. It was endowed through a 1929 bequest from Edgar Pierce, a Harvard Alumnus, who also funded the prestigious Edgar Pierce Chair in Philosophy and Psychology. Pierce stipulated that the delivered lectures be open to the public and subsequently published by the Harvard University Press. The program was initiated in 1930 and has continued to the present. Its invited lecturers have included some of the most influential thinkers of the 20th century. In some cases, the selection of lecturer has generated considerable controversy. It is not to be confused with the William James Lectures on Religious Experience, which is a different lecture series conducted in the Harvard Divinity School.

== Chronological list of invited lectureships ==
This compilation is based on a mimeographed list found in the clippings file at the Harvard Library Archives. The mimeographed list only covered the lectures delivered through 1971. The remaining items were supplied by searching for relevant monographs in the catalogs of the Harvard Library and the Library of Congress. Since not all of the lecture series resulted in a published book, the list may be incomplete.

- John Dewey ('30–'31) "Art as Experience"
- Arthur Lovejoy ('32–'33) "The Great Chain of Being: A Study of the History of an Idea"
- Wolfgang Köhler ('34–'35) "The Place of Value in a World of Facts"
- Étienne Gilson ('36–'37) "The Unity of Philosophical Experience"
- Kurt Goldstein ('38–'39) "Human Nature in the Light of Psychopathology"
- Bertrand Russell ('40–41) "An Inquiry into Meaning and Truth"
- E. L. Thorndike ('42–'43) "Human Nature and Human Institutions"
- William E. Hocking ('46–'47) "Issues in Contemporary Philosophy of Law"
- B. F. Skinner ('47–'48) "Verbal Behavior"
- Karl R. Popper ('49–'50) "The Study of Nature and Society"
- Frank A. Beach ('51–'52) "A Biological Approach to Psychology"
- J. L. Austin ('54–'55) "How to Do Things with Words"
- Robert Oppenheimer ('56–'57) "The Hope of Order"
- Donald B. Lindsley ('58–'59) "Brain Organization and Behavior"
- Gabriel Marcel ('61–'62) "The Existential Background of Human Dignity"
- Herbert A. Simon ('62–'63) "Symbolic Processes in Human Behavior"
- Edwin H. Land ('66–'67) "Color Vision from Retina to Retinex"
- H. Paul Grice ('66–'67) "Logic and Conversation"
- A. J. Ayer (1970) "Russell and Moore: The Analytical Heritage"
- Donald Broadbent (1971) "In Defense of Empirical Psychology"
- Jeffrey Satinover (1974) "Imagination in Art and Religion"
- Michael Dummett (1976) "The Logical Basis of Metaphysics"
- Donald T. Campbell (1977) "Descriptive Epistemology: Psychological, Sociological, Evolutionary"
- Richard Wollheim (1982) "The Thread of Life"
- Allen Newell (1987) "Unified Theories of Cognition"
- Roger N. Shepard (1994) "Mind and World: Principles of Perception"
- Ned Block (2012) "How Empirical Facts About Attention Transform Traditional Philosophical Debates About the Nature of Perception"

== Published versions of the lectures ==
- Austin, J.L. (1962). How to do things with words. Cambridge, MA: Harvard University Press.
- Ayer, A.J. (1971). Russell and Moore: The analytical heritage. Cambridge, MA: Harvard University Press.
- Broadbent, D.E. (1934). In defense of empirical psychology. London: Methuen.
- Campbell, D.T. (1988). Methodology and epistemology for social science: Selected papers (E. Samuel Overman, Ed.). NY: Minton, Balch & Company.
- Dewey, J. (1934). Art as experience. NY: Minton, Balch & Company.
- Dummett, M. (1991). The logical basis of metaphysics. Cambridge, MA: Harvard University Press.
- Gilson, E. (1937). The unity of philosophical experience. NY: C. Scribner's Sons.
- Goldstein, K. (1940). Human nature in the light of psychopathology. Cambridge, MA: Harvard University Press.
- Grice, H. P. (1989). Studies in the way of words. Cambridge, MA: Harvard University Press.
- Köhler, W. (1938). The place of value in a world of facts. NY: Liveright Publishing.
- Lovejoy, A.O. (1934). The great chain of being: A study of the history of an idea. Cambridge, MA: Harvard University Press
- Marcel, G. (1963). The existential background of human dignity. Cambridge, MA: Harvard University Press.
- Newell, A. (1990). Unified theories of cognition. Cambridge, MA: Harvard University Press.
- Russell, B. (1940). An inquiry into meaning and truth. NY: W.W. Norton.
- Simon, H. (1979). Models of thought. New Haven, CT: Yale University Press.
- Skinner, B.F. (1957). Verbal behavior. NY: Appleton-Century-Crofts.
- Thorndike, E.L. (1943). Man and his works. Cambridge, MA: Harvard University Press.
- Wollheim, R. (1984). The thread of life. Cambridge, MA: Harvard University Press.
