= Mad Pain and Martian Pain =

Philosophy paper by David Kellogg Lewis

"Mad Pain and Martian Pain" is a 1980 philosophical article written by David Kellogg Lewis. Lewis argued that a theory of pain must be able to reflect the most basic intuitions of both functionalism and identity theory. Because of such, he proposes the existence of two beings both in pain – one whose physical explanation of pain differs from ours and one whose reaction to pain differs from ours. Lewis states that any complete theory of the mind should be able to explain how each being is in pain.

== Lewis's two forms of pain ==
The being with "mad pain" is a human being, except when his brain is in a state of pain, his mind turns to mathematics and he begins to snap his fingers. He is not at all inclined to prevent the pain from occurring. Lewis ultimately goes on to explain that pain is relative to a species, implying that the man who exhibits mad pain is essentially an exception. He is in pain because, instantiated in him, it is that physical state which is normally an instantiation of pain in his species (humans). In Lewis' words, "In short, he feels pain but his pain does not at all occupy the typical causal role of pain."

A being with "Martian pain" is not human but, when subject to pain, will react in the same way that humans do. He is strongly inclined to prevent whatever stimulus is causing discomfort. However, the physical explanation of Martian pain is different from that of human pain. He has a "hydraulic mind" and pain is identical with inflation of cavities in his feet. Lewis suggests that the Martian is indeed in pain, because, instantiated in him is the filler of the relevant physical instantiation of pain in that species: inflation of the cavities in the feet. In Lewis' words, "In short, he feels pain but lacks the bodily states that either are in pain or else accompany it in us."

== Postscript ==
In a postscript to "Mad Pain and Martian Pain" (published in Philosophical Papers, Volume I), Lewis takes a critical view of qualia. He explicitly identifies pain with qualia, observing that, "We say to the friend of qualia that, beneath his tendentious jargon, he is just talking pain and various aspects of its functional role." (p. 130). He then lays out a response to the knowledge argument of Frank Jackson.

== Objections ==
Those who hold that the intuitions behind identity theory need not be respected are free to disagree with Lewis, and to say that "mad pain" need not be permitted or explained by a theory of pain.

== See also ==
- Philosophy of mind

== Sources ==
- Mad, Martian, but not Mad Martian Pain by Peter Alward
- Lewis, David. 1980. “Mad pain and Martian pain”, in Readings in the Philosophy of Psychology, Vol. I. N. Block, ed., Harvard University Press, 1980, pp. 216–222.
- Lewis, David. 1983. “Mad pain and Martian pain”, in Philosophical Papers, Vol. I. Oxford University Press, pp. 122–130.
- Lewis, David. 1983. “Postscript to ‘Mad pain and Martian pain’”, in Philosophical Papers, Vol. I. Oxford University Press, pp. 130–132.
