= Intertheoretic reduction =

Concept in philosophy of science

In philosophy of science, intertheoretic reduction occurs when a reducing theory makes predictions that perfectly or almost perfectly match the predictions of a reduced theory, while the reducing theory explains or predicts a wider range of phenomena under more general conditions. Special relativity, for example, can be reduced to Newtonian mechanics for speeds far less than c.

According to Alexander Rosenberg philosophers mostly these days believe that reduction between sciences is possible in principle but concepts we currently have do not allow reductions even in many cases in which natural sciences are involved, for instance from biology to chemistry.

Often, the extent to which one theory can be said to be reduced to another theory is complicated by the existence of emergent phenomena. Furthermore, there is the issue of by what criteria one judges one theory as more fundamental than another. Often, this notion is ambiguous. For instance, a quintessential example of intertheoretic reduction is often considered to be the reduction of phenomenological thermodynamics to statistical mechanics. However, it has been argued that there are some phenomena (e.g. phase transitions and critical phenomena) that cannot be reductively explicated in terms of the "more fundamental" theory of statistical mechanics.

Especially psychology is seen often as a "scientific dead-end" due to its intentional concepts (though psychology does not necessarily have to use intentional concepts). Logical analysis has suggested that intentional concepts are not reducible to non-intentional concepts used by neurophysiology in which is the discipline "underlying" the psychology.
