= Blockhead (thought experiment) =

Hypothetical computer system postulated by Ned Block

Blockhead is a theoretical computer system invented as part of a thought experiment by philosopher Ned Block, which appeared in a paper titled "Psychologism and Behaviorism". Block did not personally name the computer in the paper, but in 1993 F. Jackson claimed that this name "has become traditional".

== The Shannon–McCarthy Objection ==
In 1956, Claude Shannon and John McCarthy proposed a counterargument to the Turing test that it could be defeated by an architecturally simple system containing a hypothetical astronomically large lookup table of any conversations possible between the computer and the interrogator during a realistic test. In 1981, it was rediscovered by Ned Block and is usually associated with his name.

== Overview ==
In "Psychologism and Behaviorism", Block argues that the internal mechanism of a system is important in determining whether that system is intelligent and claims to show that a non-intelligent system could pass the Turing test. Block asks the reader to imagine a conversation lasting any given amount of time. He states that given the nature of language, there are a finite number of syntactically and grammatically correct sentences that can be used to start a conversation. Consequently, there is a limit to how many "sensible" responses can be made to the first sentence, then to the second sentence, and so on until the conversation ends. Block then asks the reader to imagine a computer which had been programmed with all the sentences in theory, if not in practice. Block argues that such a machine could continue a conversation with a person on any topic because the computer would be programmed with every sentence that it was possible to use so the computer would be able to pass the Turing test despite the fact that—according to Block—it is not intelligent. Block says that this does not show that there is only one correct internal structure for generating intelligence but simply that some internal structures do not generate intelligence.

The argument is related to John Searle's Chinese room.

== See also ==
- Dissociated press
- Philosophical zombie
