= Multiple realizability =

Thesis in the philosophy of mind

In the philosophy of mind, multiple realizability is the thesis that the same mental property, state, or event can be implemented by different physical properties, states, or events.

Philosophers of mind have used multiple realizability to argue that mental states are not the same as—and cannot be reduced to—physical states. They have also used it to defend or criticize many versions of functionalism, especially machine-state functionalism.

== Notion ==
The multiple realizability thesis in the philosophy of mind posits that the same mental state can be realized by different physical states; another way of putting it is that there is a many-to-one mapping from physical states to mental states. Multiple realizability in general is not restricted to the multiple realizability of mental states. Many kinds of things can be realized by numerous physical devices. A wide variety of physical devices can serve as corkscrews, for example. Mental states can also be realized in a variety of ways. Just as the logical states of a Turing machine can be realized by different structural states in different mechanisms, so, by analogy, the mental states of a human being can be realized by different physical states in different individuals. Pain, for example, is correlated with different physical states of the nervous system in different organisms, but the organisms all experience the mental state of "being in pain."

Mental states have been claimed to be multiply realizable not only across species and between individuals but also within individuals. At different times, the same individual may realize the same mental states in physically different forms. Neural plasticity—the fact that areas of the brain can assume the functions of other parts that have been damaged as the result of traumatic injury, pathology, natural biological development, or other processes—has long been considered to be an example. But so are more mundane facts about neurophysiology, such as the fact that neurons die and connections between them are rewired. The argument that neural plasticity supports multiple realizability has also been contested.

Gualtiero Piccinini differentiates three related properties: variable realizability, multiple realizability, and medium independence.

- A property is variably realizable if it can be instantiated by different realizers. For example, both a winged corkscrew and a waiter's corkscrew have the property of removing corks and do so through the same mechanism—a screw and pull mechanism. Because the mechanism is fundamentally unchanged, the property is variably realizable.
- For a property to be multiply realizable, the property must be able to be instantiated by different realizers and different mechanisms. The classic spring mousetrap and the glue mousetrap instantiate the same property, the ability to trap mice, but they do so through different mechanisms. As such, the property is multiply realizable.
- A property is medium independent if it can be instantiated by different realizers and different mechanisms and if the inputs and outputs of the mechanisms are also multiply realizable. A mousetrap is not medium independent; it must take a mouse as an input. A computer, though, is medium independent. A computer can be constructed from different parts assembled into different mechanisms and can take different types of inputs and outputs. In typical digital computers, the inputs and outputs are voltages, but in quantum computers, the inputs and outputs would be different.

== Significance ==
Multiple realizability has been used as an argument against type-identity theory, against reductionist theories of mind in general, for functionalist theories of mind, and even against functionalist theories of mind.

Starting in the 1960s, Hilary Putnam used multiple realizability as an argument against type-identity theory. Specifically, Putnam noted that the multiple realizability of pain entails that, contrary to type-identity theory, pain is not identical to C-fibre firing. More generally, multiple realizability shows that psychological attributes are not the same as physical attributes. Psychological attributes, rather, are disjunctions of physical attributes. Fodor, Putnam, and others noted that, along with being an effective argument against type-identity theories, multiple realizability implies that any low-level explanation of higher-level mental phenomena would be insufficiently abstract and general.

Jerry Fodor (1975) deployed multiple realizability more generally as an argument against any reductionist account of the relation between higher-level sciences and physics. Fodor also uses multiple realizability to argue against reductionism not only of psychology but of any special sciences (that is, any sciences that are "higher level" than physics). In his characterization of reductionism, all mental kind predicates in an ideal and completed psychology must correspond with physical kind predicates in an ideal and completed physics. He suggests taking Ernest Nagel's theory of reduction, which insists on the derivability of all terms in the theory to be reduced from terms in the reducing theory and the bridging laws, as the canonical theory of reduction. Given generalized multiple realizability, the physical science part of these psychophysical bridge laws will end up being a (possibly infinite) disjunction of all the terms referring to possible physical realizations of a mental kind. This disjunction cannot be a kind-predicate and therefore the entire statement cannot be a law of physics. The special sciences therefore cannot be reduced to physics.

Functionalism, which attempts to identify mental kinds with functional kinds that are characterized exclusively in terms of causes and effects, abstracts from particle physics and hence seems to be a more suitable explanation of the relation between mind and body. As a result of these arguments and others that build upon them, the dominant theory in philosophy of mind since the 1960s has been a version of non-reductive physicalism based on multiple realizability.

In 1988, Hilary Putnam used multiple realizability to argue against functionalism. Noting that functionalism is essentially a watered-down reductionist or identity theory in which mental kinds are ultimately identified with functional kinds, Putnam argues that mental kinds are probably multiply realizable over functional kinds. The same mental state or property can be implemented or realized by different states of a universal Turing machine.

== Arguments for ==
=== Conceivability argument ===
Putnam asks whether alien beings, artificially intelligent robots, and silicon-based life forms should be considered a priori incapable of experiencing pain merely because they do not have the same neurochemistry as humans. We can imagine that they might share our psychological states despite being made of different stuff. Our ability to conceive of that possibility means that multiple realizability is possible.

=== Likelihood argument ===
Putnam cites examples from the animal kingdom as evidence for the multiple realizability of mental states. Evolutionary biology—including evolutionary neuroscience—and comparative neuroanatomy and neurophysiology have demonstrated that mammals, reptiles, birds, amphibians, and mollusks have different brain structures. These animals can only share the same mental states and properties if these mental states and properties can be realized by different physical states in different species. Putnam concludes that type-identity and other reductive theories make an extremely "ambitious" and "highly implausible" conjecture that can be disproven with just one example of multiple realizability. On the contrary, it is likely that creatures that cannot be in identical physical states, due to their different composition and structure, can nevertheless be in identical psychological states. Some philosophers refer to this argument—that multiple realizability is much more likely than reductionism—as the likelihood argument.

=== A priori argument ===
Putnam also formulates a complementary argument based on functional isomorphism. He defines the concept in these terms: "Two systems are functionally isomorphic if there is a correspondence between the states of one and the states of the other that preserves functional relations." Two computers, for example, are functionally isomorphic if the sequential relations among states in one are exactly mirrored by those in the other. A computer made of electrical components and a computer made of cogs and wheels can be functionally isomorphic even though they are constitutionally different. Some philosophers refer to this as the a priori argument.

== Arguments against ==
Some philosophers accept the thesis that mental states are multiply realizable but deny that multiple realizability gives rise to functionalism or other forms of non-reductive physicalism.

=== Reductionism in other sciences ===
Early objections to multiple realizability were limited to the narrow, "across structures-type" version. Starting with David Kellogg Lewis, many reductionists argued that it is very common in scientific practice to reduce one theory to another via local, structure-specific reductions. A frequently cited example of this sort of intertheoretic reduction is temperature. The temperature of a gas is identical to mean molecular kinetic energy. Temperature in a solid is identical to mean maximal molecular kinetic energy because the molecules of a solid are more restricted in their movements. Temperature in a plasma is a mystery because the molecules of a plasma are torn apart. Therefore, temperature is multiply realized in a diversity of microphysical states.

=== Disjunction ===
Jaegwon Kim has argued that disjunction—the idea that the physical realization of a particular mental state is not a particular physical state but the disjunction of the physical states that realize that mental state—creates problems for multiple realizability. Putnam also argued against this "disjunctive" possibility in earlier work. Block and Fodor had also argued against it.

=== Causal closure of the physical ===
Jaegwon Kim has argued against non-reductive physicalism on the grounds that it violates the causal closure of the physical, which assumes that physics provides a full explanation of physical events. If mental properties are causally efficacious, they must either be identical to physical properties or there must be widespread overdetermination. The latter is often held to be either unlikely or even impossible on conceptual grounds. If Kim is right, then the options seem to be either reduction or elimination.

=== Insufficient generalizability ===
One criticism of multiple realizability is that any theory that attempts to address the possibility of generalized multiple realizability must necessarily be so local and context-specific in nature (referring exclusively to a certain token system of a certain structure-type at a certain time) that its reductions would be incompatible with even a minimally acceptable degree of generality in scientific theorizing. Any psychology that is sufficiently narrow to accommodate this level of multiple realizability required to account for neural plasticity will almost certainly not be general enough to capture the generalizations needed to explain human psychology.

Some reductionists reply that this is not empirically plausible. Research and experimentation in the neurosciences requires that some universal consistencies in brain structures must either exist or be assumed to exist. The similarity (produced by homology or convergent evolution) of brain structures allows us to generalize across species. If multiple realizability (especially the generalized form) were an empirical fact, then results from experiments conducted on one species of animal (or one organism) would not be meaningful or useful when generalized to explain the behavior or characteristics of another species (or organism of the same species; or in the generalized form, even the same organism).

Sungsu Kim has recently responded to this objection using the distinction between homology of brain structures and homoplasy. Homologies are characteristics of physiology, morphology, behavior, or psychology shared by two or more species and inherited from a common ancestor. Homoplasies are similar or identical characteristics shared by two or more species but not inherited from a common ancestor, having evolved independently. The feet of ducks and platypuses are an example of homoplasy, while the hands of humans and chimps are an example of homology. The fact that brain structures are homologous provides no evidence either for or against multiple realizability. The only way to empirically test the thesis of multiple realizability would be to examine brain structures and determine whether some homoplasious "psychological processes or functions might be 'constructed' from different material" and supported by different brain structures just as the flight capacities of bats and birds emerge from different morphophysiologies. The emergence of similar behavioral outputs or psychological functions brought about by similar or identical brain structures in convergent evolutionary lineages would provide some evidence against multiple realizability, since it is highly improbable that this would happen, if not for constraints on the type of physical system that can realize mental phenomena. This, however, would not completely refute the possibility of realizability of mental states in radically different physical systems such as non-carbon based life forms or machines.

== Historical note ==
Observations of multiple realizability—and of its relation to functionalism—predate their use in philosophy beginning in the 1960s. Alan Turing remarked on multiple realizability in 1950, for example, writing: "The fact that Babbage's Analytical Engine was to be entirely mechanical will help us rid ourselves of a superstition. Importance is often attached to the fact that modern digital computers are electrical, and the nervous system is also electrical. Since Babbage's machine was not electrical, and since all digital computers are in a sense equivalent, we see that this use of electricity cannot be of theoretical importance. ... If we wish to find such similarities we should look rather for mathematical analogies of function."

== See also ==
- Supervenience
