= Ned Block =

American philosopher (born 1942)

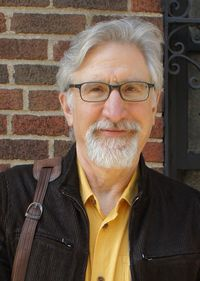
- Born: 1942 (age 83–84); Chicago, U.S.

Education
- Education: Massachusetts Institute of Technology (B.Sc., 1964); Harvard University (Ph.D., 1971)
- Doctoral advisor: Hilary Putnam

Philosophical work
- Era: 20th-century philosophy
- Region: Western philosophy
- School: Analytic philosophy
- Institutions: Massachusetts Institute of Technology; New York University
- Doctoral students: Daniel Stoljar
- Main interests: Philosophy of mind
- Notable ideas: Blockhead; China brain

Ned Joel Block (born 1942) is an American philosopher working in philosophy of mind who has made important contributions to the understanding of consciousness and the philosophy of cognitive science. He has been a professor of philosophy and psychology at New York University since 1996, and a Silver Professor since 2005.

== Education and career ==
Block obtained his PhD from Harvard University in 1971 under the direction of Hilary Putnam. He joined the Massachusetts Institute of Technology (MIT) as an assistant professor of philosophy (1971–1977), and then served as associate professor of philosophy (1977–1983), professor of philosophy (1983–1996) and as chair of the philosophy section (1989–1995). He has, since 1996, been a professor in the departments of philosophy and psychology at New York University (NYU).

Block received the Jean Nicod Prize in 2013, and has given the William James Lectures at Harvard University in 2012 and the John Locke Lectures at Oxford University in 2013, among many others.

Block is Past President of the Society for Philosophy and Psychology and was elected a Fellow of the American Academy of Arts & Sciences in 2004.

He is married to the developmental psychologist Susan Carey. Block is ethnically Ashkenazi Jewish.

== Philosophical work ==
=== Philosophy of artificial intelligence ===
Block is noted for presenting the Blockhead argument against the Turing test as a test of intelligence in a paper titled "Psychologism and Behaviorism" (1981). He is also known for his criticism of functionalism, arguing that a system with the same functional states as a human is not necessarily conscious.

Block has been a judge at the Loebner Prize contest, a contest in the tradition of the Turing Test to determine whether a conversant is a computer or a human.

=== Consciousness ===
In his more recent work on consciousness, he has made a distinction between phenomenal consciousness and access consciousness, where phenomenal consciousness consists of subjective experience and feelings and access consciousness consists of that information globally available in the cognitive system for the purposes of reasoning, speech and high-level action control. He has argued that access consciousness and phenomenal consciousness might not always coincide in human beings.

==== Overflow argument ====
Ned Block has mounted the overflow argument, which argues against the view that phenomenal consciousness and access consciousness are identical. Instead, Ned Block argues that phenomenal consciousness overflows conscious access, meaning that one can consciously experience something that they do not have conscious access to. Empirically, this means that a subject can have some content included in their conscious experience, but lack the cognitive recognition of the content that is necessary to report that the content was in fact experienced.

== See also ==
- American philosophy
- New York University Department of Philosophy
- Philosophy of artificial intelligence
