= Anatoly Dneprov (writer) =

Soviet cyberneticist and writer (1919–1975)

- Анатолий Петрович Мицкевич
- Born: Anatoliy Petrovich Mitskevich; 17 November 1919; Ekaterinoslav
- Died: 7 October 1975 (aged 55); Moscow, Soviet Union
- Citizenship: Soviet Union
- Education: Moscow State University
- Scientific career
- Fields: Cybernetics (Note: In the Soviet Union, the term cybernetics meant computer science and computer engineering.)

Anatoliy Petrovych Mitskevich (Note: Russian: Анатолий Петрович Мицкевич) (17 November 1919 – 7 October 1975), known by the pen name Anatoly Dneprov (also Dnieprov), (Note: Russian: Анатолий Днепров) was a Soviet cyberneticist and science fiction writer. His science fiction stories were published in the Soviet Union, Eastern Europe, and the United States from 1958 to 1970.

== Career ==
Anatoly Dneprov's career included work at the Institute of World Economy and International Relations of the Academy of Sciences of the Soviet Union.

The Progress Publishers, Moscow wrote of him:

His favourite subject is cybernetics – its amazing achievements to date and its breath-taking potentialities. Scientific authenticity is a salient feature of his writings.

Algis Budrys compared his short story "The Purple Mummy" to that of Eando Binder.

Many of his predictions about artificial intelligence, self-replicating machines, human cloning, and other subjects were highly prescient.

== Books ==
There is a number of collections of Dneprov's novels and short stories.

- Уравнения Максвелла: Сборник научно-фантастических повестей и рассказов. — М.: Молодая гвардия, 1960. — 128 с.
- Мир, в котором я исчез: Научно-фантастические повести и рассказы. — М.: Молодая гвардия, 1962. — 104 с.
- Формула бессмертия: Научно-фантастические повести и рассказы. — М.: Молодая гвардия, 1963. — 160 с.
- Пурпурная мумия: [Повести, рассказы]. — М.: Детская литература, 1965. — 286 с. — (Библиотека приключений и научной фантастики).
- Пророки: [Повести, рассказы, статьи]. — М.: Знание, 1971. — 304 с.
- Формула бессмертия: Научно-фантастические повести и рассказы. — М.: Молодая гвардия, 1972. — 400 с. — (Библиотека советской фантастики).
- Глиняный бог. — М.: АСТ, 2003. — 800 с. — (Классика отечественной фантастики). — ISBN 5-17-018690-8.

== Selected stories ==
- "Shipwreck" (1958)
- "Crabs on the Island" (1958)

"Why not? Any machine tool, a lathe, for example, makes parts for lathes like itself. So I conceived the notion of making an automatic machine that would manufacture copies of itself from start to finish. My crab is the model of such a machine."

- "The Maxwell Equations" (1960)

"All the sensations that go to make up your spiritual ego are nothing but electrochemical impulses that travel from receptors up to the brain to be processed, and then down to effectors."

- "The World in Which I Disappeared" (1961)
- "The Game" (1961)
- "The Purple Mummy" (1961)

This story describes the technology of 3D printing based on an electronic description of an object:

'These thin needles are something like those used for intermuscular injections. A thin stream of plastic material is pressed through them in short spurts. Hot plastic cooled by cold air. The needles are synchronized with the ultra-sound needles which are at this moment feeling around the real object positioned in Roma. Drop by drop, point by point, the thin stream of plastic builds the model. The scale of the model may be regulated by using these levers. They may be made larger or smaller than the real object...'

'What about the colour?'

'That's easy. In the initial state the material is colourless, but the photocalorimeter, according to the colour information received, adds the necessary amounts of the dyes indicated...'

- "The Formula For Immortality" (1962)
- "When Questions Are Asked" (1963)
- "Prophets" (1970)

=== "The Game" ===
Dneprov's short story "The Game" (1961) anticipates the later China brain and Chinese room thought experiments. It concerns a stadium of people who act as switches and memory cells implementing a program to translate a sentence from Portuguese (a language that none of them know) to Russian. The plot of the story goes as follows: all 1400 delegates of the Soviet Congress of Young Mathematicians willingly agree to take part in a "purely mathematical game" proposed by professor Zarubin. The game requires the execution of a certain set of rules given to the participants, who communicate with each other using sentences composed only of the words "zero" and "one". After several hours of playing the game, the participants have no idea what is going on as they get progressively tired. One girl becomes too dizzy and leaves the game just before it ends. On the next day, Zarubin reveals to everyone's excitement that the participants were simulating an existing 1961 Soviet computer named Ural that translated a Portuguese sentence "Os maiores resultados são produzidos por pequenos mas contínuos esforços," into Russian "Величайшие результаты достигаются небольшими, но постоянными усидрмки" (The greatest goals are achieved through minor but continuous ekkedt). It becomes clear that the last word, which should have been "усилиями" (efforts), is mistranslated due to the dizzy girl leaving the simulation.

The philosophical argument developed by Dneprov is presented in the form of Socratic dialogue. Consequently, the main conclusion from the Portuguese stadium is contained in the final words of the main character, Professor Zarubin: "I think our game gave us the right answer to the question 'Can machines think?' We have proven that even the most perfect simulation of machine thinking is not the thinking process itself."

Polish science fiction writer Stanisław Lem summarizes Dneprov's argument in his book Summa Technologiae (1964) as follows:

Physicist and science fiction writer Anatoly Dneprov has described an experiment in his novella, whose aim was to debunk a thesis about "infusing with spirituality" a language-to-language translation machine by replacing the machine's elements such as transistors and other switches with people who have been spatially distributed in a particular way. Performing the simple functions of signal transfer, this "machine" made of people translated a sentence from Portuguese into Russian, while its designer asked all the people who constituted the "elements" of that machine what this sentence meant. No one knew it, of course, because the language-to-language translation was carried out by the system as a dynamic whole. The designer (in the novella) concluded that "the machine was not intelligent."

== See also ==
- Soviet science fiction
