= Anatoly Dneprov (singer) =

Russian-Ukrainian singer (1947–2008)

- Dneprov in 2013

Background information
- Born: Anatoly Semyonovich Gross; 1 April 1947; Dnipropetrovsk, Ukrainian SSR, Soviet Union
- Died: 5 May 2008 (aged 61) Belaya Kalitva, Rostov Oblast, Russia
- Occupations: Singer; musician; composer; lyricist
- Instruments: Vocals; piano
- Years active: 1967–2008
- Spouse: Olga Pavlova
- Website: Official website (in Russian)

Anatoly Semyonovich Dneprov (Note: Russian: Анатолий Семёнович Днепров, Ukrainian: Анатолій Семенович Дніпров, romanized: Anatolii Semenovych Dniprov) (né Gross; 1 April 1947 — 5 May 2008) was a Soviet and Russian singer, musician, composer and lyricist.

== Biography ==
Anatoly Semyonovich Dneprov was born Anatoly Semyonovich Gross on 1 April 1947 in Dnipropetrovsk to a Jewish couple. In 1963 he entered the Dnipropetrovsk Industrial Technical Institute and wanted to become a Master of Instrumentations and Measuring devices, but in 1964 he followed his musical destiny and entered the Dnipropetrovsk Musical Academy named after Mikhail Glinka.

From 1967 to 1970, he was in the Soviet army and was one of the head musicians in the Ensemble of Song and Dance of the Ministry of Internal Affairs of the Ukrainian SSR and Moldova based in Kiev.

After the army he was a pianist in the jazz band of the Dnipropetrovsk pipe-rolling factory named after Karl Liebknecht. In 1971 he graduated from the Musical Academy and moved to Moscow where he became one of the most famous Soviet pop composers of the 70s, selling almost 200 million albums with his music that was performed by various Soviet performers.

From 1979 to 1987, he lived in New York and became a very popular singer in the Russian community that was living abroad. In 1987 he moved back to Moscow and began touring all over the Soviet Union. He recorded many hits and filmed many videos and documentary films that were shown on Soviet and Russian national Television.

He received many awards and prizes in the Soviet Union and afterwards Russia for his achievements as a composer and singer. He is the author of such songs as Armenia (with Tata Simonyan), Helpline, The Jewish Boy, Russia, A Glass of Nostalgia, Ah, How Pity and many others.

The lyrics to most of his songs were written by his wife Olga Pavlova, a Russian poet and radio host who has written lyrics for a lot of Russian artists. She is also the daughter of the famous Russian impresario, concert administrator and director Pavel Leonidovich Leonidov (director to such artists as Joseph Kobzon, Vadim Mulerman, the pop group Samotsvety and others), who died in 1984 in New York City.

Dneprov also wrote with the poet Mikhail Tanich the most famous Russian love song that is called Radovat (sometimes called Balovat or Vydumat), the song is almost 30 years old but is still performed by famous Russian pop groups and singers to this day.

Dneprov died on 5 May 2008, at about 11:45, aged 61. He died in a car (on the Volgograd-Rostov highway, 18 km from the city Belaya Kalitva) going to his own concert in Rostov.

He is survived by his wife Olga Pavlova (born 1952), his sons Filip and Pavel, his daughter Elena, granddaughter Anastasia and grandson Christian.
