= Mental fact =

Mental facts include such things as perceptions, feelings, and judgments. Mental facts are ultimately caused by physical facts, in that mental facts depend on physical and biological functions which are required for consciousness. The physical and biological processes which are necessary for consciousness enable conscious individuals to recognize physical and mental facts. Thus, mental facts are based on physical facts, and both physical and mental facts are required for the construction of social reality.

According to John Searle, mental facts may be intentional or nonintentional, depending on whether or not they are directed at something.

== See also ==
- Brute fact
- is and ought problem - the distinction between factual claims and value or normative claims
- matter of fact and matter of law
- Vertiginous question
