= Illusionism (philosophy of mind) =

View in philosophy of mind

Illusionism is a family of views in philosophy of mind according to which phenomenal consciousness is an illusion that either does not exist or is a misrepresentation of real neural processes. Closely related to eliminative materialism, it is generally a form of materialism or physicalism as it argues that consciousness is determined entirely by the physical world. It is also related to Michael Graziano's attention schema theory, which considers the brain to be an information processing device that gathers data about its own attention into an internal model of reality which it then represents as a conscious experience, mistakenly ascribing to it special attributes it does not actually have. Illusionism argues that qualia—the phenomenal properties of sensations, such as "what it is like" to experience color, touch or sound—are poorly defined or lack an empirical foundation, and should be rejected or redefined.

Proponents of illusionism include philosophers Daniel Dennett, Keith Frankish and Jay L. Garfield, as well as Graziano. The term was coined in 2016 by Frankish, who wrote that illusionism does not deny the existence of consciousness but offers a different account of what it is. Forms of strong illusionism posit that neither phenomenal consciousness nor qualia exist, standing in direct opposition to phenomenal realism, which asserts that they do. Forms of weak illusionism posit that they do exist but are misrepresented. This article refers to strong illusionism simply as illusionism.

While the hard problem of consciousness asks why conscious experiences are accompanied by phenomenal properties, illusionism rejects the hard problem entirely, replacing it with the "illusion problem", which asks: "Why does it seem that experiences have phenomenal properties and why is this illusion so powerful?" Illusionism is a form of type-A materialism as it asserts that consciousness can be fully explained by solving the easy problems, which concern the mechanistic and behavioral basis of cognitive processes. Illusionism is sometimes called illusionism about consciousness, distinguishing it from similarly-named theories in other fields, such as illusionism in free will.

Views that reject the existence of phenomenal consciousness have been criticized by philosophers David Chalmers, Galen Strawson, Jesse Prinz, John Searle and others. Critics argue that phenomenal experiences are obviously real, or find illusionism to be self-refuting.

== Overview ==
A major motivation for developing illusionism is to strengthen the case for physicalism by dismissing the complications of the hard problem of consciousness. To introduce illusionism in his 2016 paper "Illusionism as a Theory of Consciousness", Keith Frankish presents a thought experiment involving psychokinesis, the psychic ability to manipulate objects using the mind without physical interaction. According to Frankish, if such a radically inexplicable ability were one day demonstrated, science would have three options:

1. Accept the phenomenon as real, possibly leading to major revisions to existing scientific theory.
2. Accept the phenomenon as real, but argue that it is not anomalous and can be explained by existing scientific theory.
3. Argue that the phenomenon is illusory, and investigate how this illusion is produced.

The first two options are realist – the first radical and the second conservative – proposing that the phenomenon is real, while the third option corresponds to illusionism. Frankish states that phenomenal properties also seem anomalous as they are inaccessible to third-person science and inexplicable in physical terms.

In his 1993 paper "Quining Qualia", Daniel Dennett writes that these phenomenal properties or qualia are often said to possess the following attributes:

1. They are "directly" or "immediately" graspable during our conscious experiences.
2. We are infallible about them: we cannot be wrong about them.
3. They are "private": no one can directly access anyone else's qualia.
4. They are ineffable: the idea of them cannot be described with words.
5. They are "intrinsic" and "simple" or impossible to analyze.

Dennett presents a series of thought experiments to demonstrate that qualia do not have these attributes. For example, the "inexperienced beer drinker": someone who drinks beer for the first time often finds the taste unpleasant, yet comes to enjoy it, although the composition of the taste remains the same. In response to the inverted spectrum scenario in which a neurosurgeon changes a patient's perception of color, for example causing them to perceive green as red, Dennett argues that instead of changing the perception, the patient's memory of the colors could be altered instead, leading to an identical reaction from them, concluding that we are not infallible about qualia. Dennett also presented the phenomenon of change blindness as an example of this. In countering the knowledge argument, he argued that qualia are so poorly defined that asserting their existence does not serve empirical research as they introduce unanswerable questions, and that they should be rejected altogether.

Dennett denied the conceivability of philosophical zombies—hypothetical entities that behave exactly like humans but lack phenomenal consciousness—by presenting a similar entity that thinks it is conscious, thinks it has qualia and thinks it suffers pains, but is wrong about these perceptions "in ways that neither they nor we could ever discover". This led him to conclude that "we are all philosophical zombies" and reject the concept.

David Chalmers, a critic of illusionism, presented a coincidence argument in its favor: if there exists a method that can explain our intuitions about phenomenal consciousness independently of the concepts of consciousness itself, and if those intuitions themselves are correct, then this correctness must be a coincidence. This is highly unlikely; therefore it is likely that our intuitions are not correct. Even if one dismisses this coincidence by assuming the existence of a causal link or psychophysical laws that guarantee this correlation, he finds it difficult to deny for several reasons:

1. It is an odd coincidence that we are not philosophical zombies or in an inverted world where, for example, we feel pleasure when we should feel pain.
2. It is an odd coincidence that our perception that phenomenal consciousness exists is, in turn, caused by consciousness and not by some other mechanism.

However, Chalmers rejects illusionism on the basis of the Moorean argument below.

=== Strong and weak illusionism ===
In his 2016 paper, Frankish distinguishes between the positions of strong and weak illusionism: weak illusionism argues that phenomenal properties are real but their nature is misrepresented, while strong illusionism argues that they do not exist at all. He highlights the difference between them by introducing the concept of a "quasi-phenomenal property" — a non-phenomenal, physical property that introspection misrepresents as phenomenal. Strong illusionists hold that introspectable qualities of subjective experience are merely quasi-phenomenal ones, while weak illusionists do not. Weak theories posit the existence of what Frankish calls diet qualia—phenomenal characters of experience, but lacking the "special attributes" listed above. Finding it difficult to explain the existence of such properties in a physicalist framework, Frankish doubts the viability of weak illusionism, arguing that the position will either collapse into radical phenomenal realism—the view that phenomenal properties are real and will require serious revisions to scientific theory—or into strong illusionism. One example of a weak illusionist theory is the phenomenal concept strategy, a form of type-B materialism that attempts to explain why we think there is an explanatory gap in theories of consciousness.

In his 2018 paper "The Meta-Problem of Consciousness", David Chalmers, who formulated the hard problem of consciousness, wrote: "In practice, there are more weak illusionists than strong [illusionists], since strong illusionism is widely regarded as very implausible." However, he agrees with Frankish that illusionists who wish to dissolve the hard problem should be strong illusionists: "if an illusionist wants to reject this route to the hard problem, they need to deny that there is anything it is like to be us". As such, strong illusionism is a form of type-A materialism. Academic literature often refers to strong illusionism simply as illusionism, (Note: Attributed to multiple sources:) or as illusionism about consciousness when distinguishing it from similarly-named theories in other fields, such as illusionism in free will.

=== Introspection ===
John Searle criticized Dennett's denial of phenomenal consciousness, asserting that "where consciousness is concerned the existence of the appearance is the reality". In response, Frankish writes that if our belief in the infallible authority over the truthfulness of our own phenomenal experiences is mistaken, introspection of those experiences would also be unreliable. He argues that this nuance makes illusionism compatible with Searle's objection. Frankish cites Dennett, who compared this authority to that which "a storyteller has over their fictions".

In response to the objection that the introspective illusion appears to have its own phenomenal properties, Derk Pereboom argued that these features should be treated as a further illusion, as the "mode of presentation" of a quasi-phenomenal mental state can itself be misrepresented. François Kammerer, a proponent of the view, wrote that it is difficult for one to think of phenomenal consciousness as an illusion, as attempting to conceive of an introspective illusion would result in a mental state that incorporates the original experience with all its apparent phenomenal properties. He formulated the "illusion meta-problem", which asks why the idea of illusionism is so exceptionally counter-intuitive and difficult to entertain.

In response to the question of "Who is the audience?", Frankish argues that while there may be an inner "representer" as a system or set of processes which generates introspective representations, there is no need for an "observer" or second consciousness to appreciate these illusory representations. According to Dennett, "all the work of appreciation and reaction [is] distributed among numerous unintelligent subsystems". He compared phenomenal consciousness to a "user illusion": a computer's user interface features icons for files and folders, but these are a fiction created for the user's benefit, allowing them to interface with the computer without knowledge of its internal operation. In this sense, the brain hides its own complexity from itself.

== Development ==
David Chalmers traced illusionist thought in Western philosophy to works as early as Immanuel Kant's Critique of Pure Reason (1781/1787), in which Kant argued that a "transcendental illusion" is responsible for the intuition that the self is a "simple substance". Ullin Place wrote that dualist intuitions of consciousness are a "phenomenal fallacy" in his 1956 paper "Is Consciousness a Brain Process?", which launched the identity theory of mind, proposing that mental events can be grouped into types and correlated with physical events in the brain. British philosopher Gilbert Ryle presented a critique in his 1949 book The Concept of Mind, arguing that dualism is founded on a category mistake, rejecting the theory that the body and mind are two separate entities that interact with each other and tracing the "myth" of Cartesian mind–body dualism to namesake René Descartes. Jay L. Garfield has also criticized Thomas Nagel's 1974 paper "What Is It Like to Be a Bat?" for entrenching dualist intuitions.

Illusionism is closely associated with the approach known as eliminative materialism or eliminativism, which aims to reject the existence of mental states described by folk psychology. While Patricia and Paul Churchland have applied this approach to deny the existence of propositional attitudes, others like Dennett, Frankish and Georges Rey have applied it to deny the existence of qualia and phenomenal consciousness itself. François Kammerer considers illusionism to be a form of eliminativism, whereas Frankish considers the two to be synonymous, preferring illusionism.

According to Chalmers, proponents of illusionism hold that once we can explain consciousness as an illusion without the need for a realist view of consciousness, we can construct a debunking argument against realist views of consciousness. This line of argument draws from other debunking arguments like the evolutionary debunking argument in the field of metaethics. Such arguments note that morality is explained by evolution without positing moral realism, so there is a sufficient basis to debunk moral realism.

=== Daniel Dennett ===
The view that phenomenal consciousness is an illusion is strongly associated with American philosopher and cognitive scientist Daniel Dennett, who studied under Ryle. In 1979, he published a paper titled "On the Absence of Phenomenology", arguing that phenomenal consciousness does not exist. In his 1991 book Consciousness Explained, he similarly rejected Cartesian dualism in favor of a physicalist perspective on consciousness, striving towards a philosophy of mind grounded in empirical research. This method, which he termed heterophenomenology, aims to treat all reports of phenomenal experience from an objective, third-person perspective.

Dennett argued that even some materialist theories suffer from "Cartesian theater": if there is an internal observer receiving your perceptions, does this observer have an observer as well?

To combat Cartesian dualism, Dennett coined the term Cartesian theater, stating that various dualist theories present consciousness as a centralized "stage" on which perceptions are presented to an internal observer, considering this to be a logical flaw that implies infinite regress as one would have to explain if this observer has their own observer, and so on. In presenting his multiple drafts model, according to which consciousness is "blurry" and distributed over space and time in the brain, Dennett wrote that the Cartesian theater is an "unacknowledged residue" that emerges even in modern materialist views which otherwise reject dualist views, writing that "the persuasive imagery of the Cartesian Theater keeps coming back to haunt us—laypeople and scientists alike—even after its ghostly dualism has been denounced and exorcised". The objection echoes the "private theater" or "second theater" concepts derided by Ryle in The Concept of Mind.

Dennett argued that the hard problem of consciousness would be solved in the process of solving the "easy problems" of consciousness, which concern the mechanistic and behavioral explanations of conscious processes. He wrote that the two classes of problems should not be separated but rather explained together as a single cohesive unit. He instead posed the "hard question of consciousness", asking: "Once some item or content 'enters consciousness', what does this cause or enable or modify?", which he humorously shortened to "And then what happens?" He argued that researchers postpone asking this question while failing to notice that their process of solving the easy problems dismantles the hard problem.

In the context of the computational theory of mind, Dennett held that consciousness is the computation, and there is no extra step in which one becomes conscious of the computation. He had a similar opinion on the China brain thought experiment: if every person in China were asked to simulate and communicate the action of one neuron in the brain, such a brain would indeed have a mental state. Alongside Douglas Hofstadter, he argued that anything that can pass the Turing test is necessarily conscious.

=== Keith Frankish ===
Philosopher Keith Frankish initially endorsed a weak form of realism about qualia, but later rejected phenomenal realism altogether, arguing that "materialists should be thoroughgoing eliminativists about qualia".

He coined the term illusionism in a 2016 article titled "Illusionism as a Theory of Consciousness", finding it to be preferable to eliminativism. In the article, published in a special edition of the Journal of Consciousness Studies dedicated to the view, Frankish states that while other theories accept the existence of phenomenal properties and attempt to explain how they come to exist, illusionism sees them as illusions that are "not instantiated in our world" and aims to explain why they seem to exist. He writes that this allows phenomenal properties to be treated as representations of (non-existent) intentional objects with a "magical, non-physical character" while also permitting them a causal role, the combination of which he finds beneficial, considering it untenable in realist theories. He cites the works of Nicholas Humphrey, who has characterized conscious experience as a presentation of an "internal magic show" composed of complex feedback loops. Frankish also refers to Dennett's multiple drafts model, contemplating if the brain may be making use of multiple presentations instead of just one.

He concludes that illusionism "replaces the hard problem with the illusion problem—the problem of explaining how the illusion of phenomenality arises and why it is so powerful". Dennett responded to Frankish with a paper titled "Illusionism as the Obvious Default Theory of Consciousness", in which he compares the "illusion" to stage magic and reiterates that the burden is to "explain how the 'magic' is done".

In 2020, Frankish summarized the position:

Illusionists do not deny the existence of consciousness, but they do offer a different account of what consciousness is [...] They hold that mental qualities are a sort of illusion, and they respond to the objection that this claim is circular by pointing out that illusions can be understood in informational/reactive terms.

Frankish wrote in 2021 that the problem of consciousness arises following its "depsychologization" when conceptualizing it in terms of phenomenal "feel" rather than psychological function, arguing that competing theories like panpsychism consign consciousness to a "metaphysical limbo" where it is "beyond the reach of science and lacks ethical and personal significance", and that this kind of depsychologization should be questioned.

=== Michael Graziano ===
In his book Consciousness and the Social Brain, neuroscientist Michael Graziano advocates what he calls attention schema theory (AST), proposing that our perception of being conscious is merely an error in perception, held by brains which evolved to hold erroneous and incomplete models of their own internal workings, just as they hold such models of their own bodies and of the external world. The theory sees the brain as an information processing device, able to selectively focus on signals such as incoming sensations or internally recalled memories through a mechanism known as attention. Through a physical and mechanistic process emergent from the interactions of neurons, the brain constructs a simplified representation or "schema" that provides a good but detail-poor account of attention, which it then characterizes as a subjective experience. Without this schema, the brain would no longer have the information necessary to make the claim that it is conscious, but as a side effect, having one gives rise to the perception that consciousness is a non-physical, unmeasurable and "mystical" essence.

While finding AST to be the only overtly illusionist theory in cognitive neuroscience, Graziano rejects the name illusionism as he believes the term illusion should only be used to describe rare and abnormal dysfunctions in a detecting mechanism, instead preferring the term caricature. He argues that while access consciousness—that of information access—does exist, phenomenal consciousness (which he terms m-consciousness for "mysterious") does not.

=== Jay L. Garfield ===
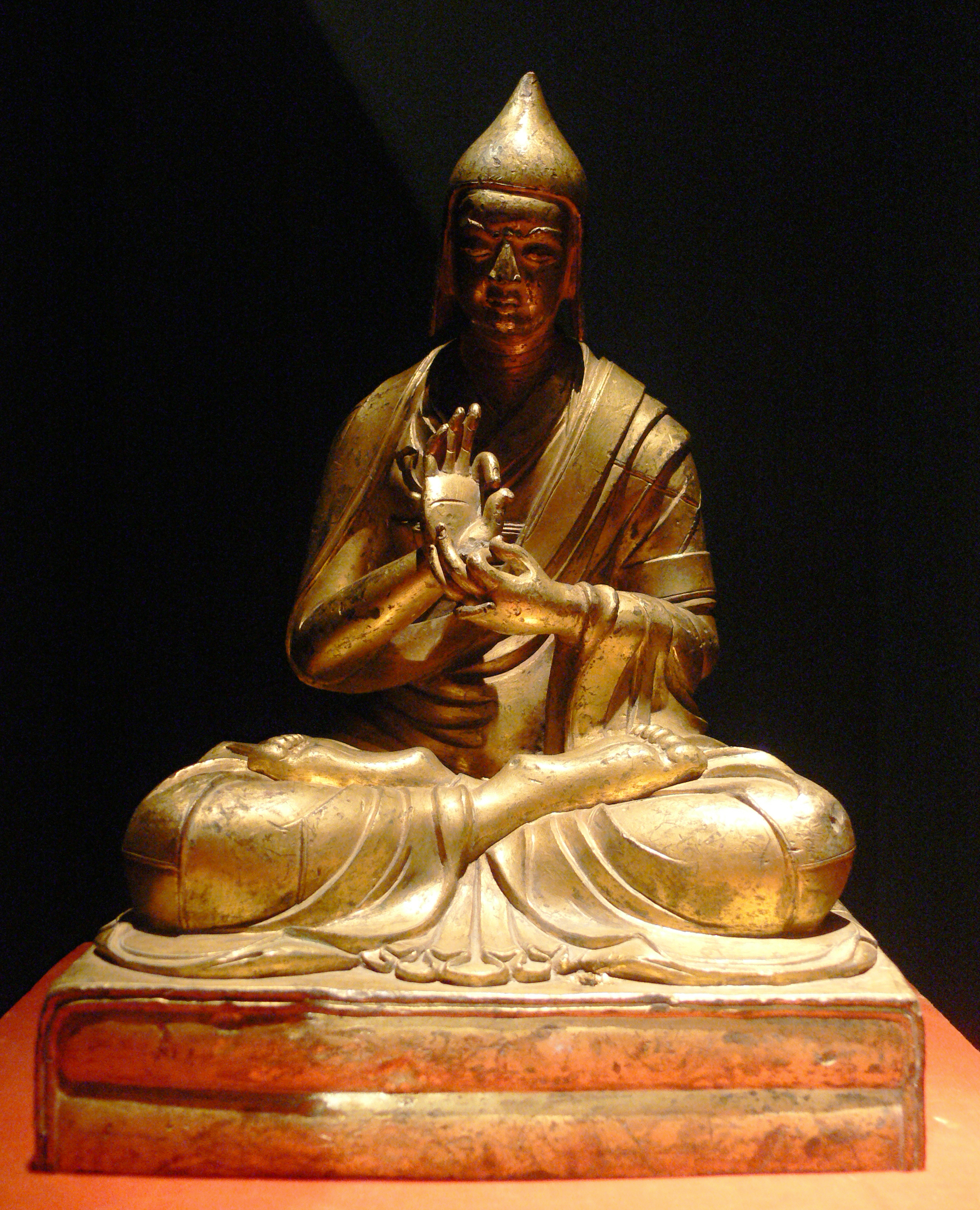
Garfield cites Buddhist philosopher Tsongkhapa (c. 1357–1419), arguing that phenomenal realism mistakes the instrument of knowledge for the object of knowledge.

In the paper "Illusionism and Givenness", philosopher Jay L. Garfield, who specializes in Tibetan Buddhism, rejects the existence of phenomenal consciousness and compares it to the "Myth of the Given", popularized by Wilfrid Sellars in his 1956 paper "Empiricism and the Philosophy of Mind", in which he criticized the view that perceptual knowledge can be independent of the conceptual capacities involved in perception.

Describing the "poverty of introspection", Garfield argues that when one becomes aware of the taste and color of a mango or the scent of sandalwood, they discover only an external object and nothing more. Citing 14th-15th century Tibetan Buddhist philosopher Tsongkhapa, he asserts that phenomenal realism mistakes the epistemic instrument (the instrument of knowledge) for the epistemic object: "When we see the moons of Jupiter through a telescope, we see the moons of Jupiter [...] When we focus on the light refracted through the lenses, we take a higher-order perspective on that perceptual process, but that objectifies the light; it does not create experience of subjectivity." He finds a similar view echoed in the works of 4th-5th century Buddhist philosopher Vasubandhu and his rejection of subjective-objective duality in the context of the Three Natures in Yogachara tradition.

=== Others ===
In a follow-up summarizing responses to his 2016 paper, Frankish listed Dennett, Garfield, Georges Rey, Amber Ross and James Tartaglia as "advocates" of illusionism, and Graziano, François Kammerer, Derk Pereboom, Nicole Marinsek and Michael Gazzaniga as "explorers" of the view.

Rey compared the concept of phenomenal consciousness to the concept of the sky, finding it useful in everyday conversation but difficult to associate with a specific natural phenomenon. Physicalist Derk Pereboom argued in his 2011 book Consciousness and the Prospects of Physicalism that the phenomenal properties of consciousness may be misrepresented. In response to the 2016 paper, he wrote that Frankish should move away from a functionalist approach in order to provide illusionism a strong response to the knowledge and zombie conceivability arguments. Additionally, Tartaglia presented a non-physicalist view of illusionism.

Marinsek and Gazzaniga approached illusionism from the view of split-brain disconnection syndrome, in which the corpus callosum connecting the two hemispheres of the brain is severed. Both hemispheres then make up a separate "brain", and this sometimes leads to self-contradictory behaviors such as alien hand syndrome, yet patients maintain or even unconsciously confabulate a sense of psychological unity. They proposed that even without this severance, assuming illusionism is correct, phenomenal consciousness may be fragmented and composed of several "modular illusions" with different characteristics.

Skeptic Susan Blackmore distanced herself from illusionism, instead preferring a stance she dubbed delusionism, focusing on false assumptions made about consciousness. She wrote that having her students ask themselves "Am I conscious?" and "Was I conscious a moment ago?" would expose a transient nature in the concept of consciousness. She argued that introspection leads to the creation of a temporary "self-model" alongside the various parallel processes operating in the brain, and that there is no way to determine which of these processes have consciousness, as the concept is "an attribution we make, not a property of events, thoughts, brain processes or anything else". She expressed the belief that, if her analysis is correct, no neural correlates of consciousness will ever be found aside from correlates to "specific actions, thoughts, perceptions, and so on".

== Criticism ==
=== Denial of phenomenal consciousness ===
In response to Daniel Dennett's 1991 book Consciousness Explained, John Searle argued that Dennett makes a category mistake when rejecting subjectivity, finding that his denial of first-person data about consciousness is self-refuting as it denies the very data he sets out to explain. Searle wrote that, in Dennett's view, consciousness amounts to nothing more than computation:

Here is the paradox of this exchange: I am a conscious reviewer consciously answering the objections of an author who gives every indication of being consciously and puzzlingly angry. I do this for a readership that I assume is conscious. How then can I take seriously his claim that consciousness does not really exist?

Analytic philosopher Galen Strawson firmly criticized the position that conscious experience does not exist in a 2018 article for the New York Review of Books titled "The Consciousness Deniers", calling it "the silliest claim ever made". Referring to an interview in the New York Times in which Dennett called qualia "sheer illusion", Strawson responded: "If he’s right, no one has ever really suffered, in spite of agonizing diseases, mental illness, murder, rape, famine, slavery, bereavement, torture, and genocide." Dennett replied that he does not deny the existence of consciousness, but holds a different view of what it is, arguing that it would be "strange" to derive fundamental knowledge of a phenomenon simply by undergoing its processes. In turn, Strawson wrote that no basis exists "in physics or in any other part of science" to deny the existence of consciousness, and remarked that philosophers Jay L. Garfield and Mark Siderits support Dennett's views on consciousness while having an interest in Buddhist philosophy, which, Strawson argued, affirms its existence as well.

Christof Koch, a neuroscientist and one of the leading proponents of integrated information theory (IIT), also criticized the view that phenomenal consciousness is an illusion, and compared it to Cotard's syndrome—the delusion that one is dead or non-existent—calling eliminative materialism an example of how "much of twentieth-century analytic philosophy has gone to the dogs".

=== Illusionism ===
In a follow-up to "Illusionism as a Theory of Consciousness", Frankish replied to responses to the article, listing Susan Blackmore, Nicholas Humphrey, Pete Mandik and Eric Schwitzgebel as "skeptics" of illusionism. In the category of "opponents" he included thinkers such as Katalin Balog, Philip Goff, Martine Nida-Rümelin and Jesse Prinz.

Prinz criticized Frankish's illusionism, writing that it either collapses into realism or introduces a deep puzzle similar to the hard problem of consciousness, concluding that reductive realism is more compelling. Nida-Rümelin called illusionism "absurd", finding Frankish's use of phenomenal properties as a technical term to be erroneous. In a counter-argument, she instead defines phenomenal consciousness through "experiential properties", which, she argues, cannot be illusory. Balog cited the phenomenal concept strategy to argue against what she considered to be scientism in Frankish's theory, writing that his approach covertly reintroduces qualia. She asserted that illusionism is "extraordinarily implausible" and should only be considered "after all other avenues have been exhausted".

Frankish has responded to criticisms by asserting that phenomenal realists have to conceive of qualia as being either observational or theoretical in nature. If conceived of as observational, then realists cannot claim that illusionists are leaving anything out of their theories of consciousness, as such a claim would presuppose qualia as having certain theoretical components. If conceived of as theoretical, then illusionists are simply denying the theoretical components of qualia but not the mere fact that they exist, which is what they are attempting to explain in the first place. He expressed doubt that a physicalist account of a "direct acquaintance" to phenomenal properties can be given, and argued that the illusion problem may prove easier to solve than the hard problem.

Nicholas Humphrey, who has collaborated with Dennett and written several books on the illusory nature of consciousness, criticized Frankish's 2016 paper, stating: "The phenomenal feel arises with the representation, and thereby its existence becomes a fact." He suggested that the view instead be called phenomenal surrealism to signify that phenomenal properties are "more real" than the physiological events that cause them, writing that they are indeed "simple, ineffable, intrinsic, private [and] immediately apprehended" from the subjective point of view. Frankish, however, argued that this position is compatible with illusionism, writing that both Humphrey and Graziano hold the view that consciousness is "based in a dynamic relation rather than passive awareness".

Christopher Devlin Brown of Xiamen University insisted that illusionism be rejected as it negates the "sole epistemic bedrock" of certainty provided by Cartesian dualism, instead leading to absolute nihilism—the denial that anything exists. Alongside David Papineau, Brown argued that illusionism's disagreement with type-B materialism (a posteriori physicalism) is not substantial as it stems from a terminological imprecision related to the meaning of the word conscious.

Analyzing why illusionism is often rejected outright by critics and instead approached in a charitable or "diagnostic" manner, Takuya Niikawa of Kobe University argued that the definition of phenomenal consciousness is "extremely obscure" and that this reaction stems from a disagreement in terminology. Niikawa stated that the definition of a phenomenally conscious state that illusionists use is one by which the subject experiences feeling by virtue of being in that state, combined with the condition that the feeling is "different from [the subject's] physical and functional properties"; illusionists then reject the existence of such a state.

Walter Veit, a lecturer in philosophy at the University of Reading, has criticized the abandonment of terms like qualia, finding that the terms should instead be redefined, believing it is Frankish who is "caught in Cartesian gravity, trying to avoid even terms like 'feeling', while nevertheless playing the game by Cartesian rules".

==== David Chalmers ====
In his 1996 book The Conscious Mind, David Chalmers writes that the position fails to "take consciousness seriously". He has held that while strong illusionism is not logically incoherent, it is empirically false, presenting an objection in his 2018 paper "The Meta-Problem of Consciousness" in the form of a Moorean argument:

1. People sometimes feel pain.
2. If strong illusionism is true, no one feels pain.
3. Therefore, strong illusionism is false.

He states that the first premise is obviously true, and that the second premise follows from the claims that pain is a conscious experience and that strong illusionism denies the existence of any conscious experiences.

According to Chalmers, a strong illusionist should deny the first premise, as Dennett did in his 1978 paper "Why You Can't Make a Computer that Feels Pain", and should argue that people can undergo the processes of feeling pain and register them while denying that they experience and feel pain. Chalmers has stated that if he were a materialist, he would be an illusionist, but holds that illusionism is false, as pain is something that is obviously experienced. He formulated the "meta-problem of consciousness", considering it to be a more neutral alternative to the illusion problem: "Why do we think there is a problem of consciousness?"

Chalmers agrees that a mechanism for beliefs and reports about consciousness can and should be identified using the standard methods of physical science, but disagrees that this would support illusionism, saying that the datum illusionism fails to account for is not reports of consciousness but rather first-person consciousness itself. He separates consciousness from beliefs and reports about consciousness, but holds that a fully satisfactory theory should explain how the two are "inextricably intertwined" so that their alignment does not require an inexplicable coincidence. In his 2020 paper "Debunking Arguments for Illusionism about Consciousness", Chalmers writes: "For the illusionist, what is needed is an explanation of how having a mind without phenomenal consciousness could be like this, even though it is not at all the way that it seems. What would be ideal is something that does more than explaining our reactions and judgments (which seems to simply miss the phenomenon), without going so far as explaining the conscious experience itself (which an illusionist cannot do)."

== See also ==
- Computational theory of mind
- Direct and indirect realism
- Explanatory gap
- Functionalism (philosophy of mind)
- Perceptual conceptualism
- Transparency of experience
- Qualia § Critics of qualia
