= Keith Frankish =

British philosopher (born 1962)

- Born: 7 November 1962; South Yorkshire, England
- Spouse: Maria Kasmirli

Education
- Education: The Open University, University of Sheffield, MA Philosophy (1996), PhD Philosophy (2003)
- Thesis: Mind and supermind a two-level framework for folk psychology
- Doctoral advisor: Peter Carruthers, Christopher Hookway

Philosophical work
- Era: 21st-century philosophy
- Region: Western philosophy
- School: Analytic philosophy
- Institutions: Honorary reader at the University of Sheffield, UK, visiting research fellow with The Open University, adjunct professor with the Brain and Mind Programme at the University of Crete
- Main interests: Philosophy of mind
- Notable ideas: Illusionism
- Website: keithfrankish.com

Keith Frankish (born 7 November 1962) is a British philosopher specializing in philosophy of mind, philosophy of psychology, and philosophy of cognitive science. He is an Honorary Reader at the University of Sheffield, UK, visiting research fellow with The Open University, and adjunct professor with the Brain and Mind Programme at the University of Crete. He is known for his "illusionist" stance in the theory of consciousness. He holds that the conscious mind is a virtual system, a trick of the biological mind. In other words, phenomenality is an introspective illusion. This position is in opposition to dualism, type physicalism, and panpsychism.

== Biography ==
=== Early life and education ===
Born and raised near Doncaster in South Yorkshire, England, Frankish says he spent many hours alone reading due to childhood illness. His heroes were the cricketer Geoff Boycott, the fictional aviator Biggles, and the zoologist and humorous author Gerald Durrell.

His undergraduate work was done at The Open University, where he took courses in literature, ancient history, and philosophy. He contemplated becoming a classicist but was later drawn to philosophy and psychology. He chose Philosophy of Mind because it encompassed most all his previous academic interests. His postgraduate education was at the University of Sheffield. He wrote his concluding master's thesis on Daniel Dennett's belief/opinion distinction. He continued at Sheffield as a doctoral student, supported by a British Academy studentship. His PhD thesis, which was supervised by Peter Carruthers and Chris Hookway, "distinguished two types of belief and argued for a two-level framework for folk psychology."

While at Sheffield he held a Temporary Lectureship in the Philosophy Department, teaching courses in mind, language, and action and was closely involved in the work of the Hang Seng Centre for Cognitive Studies.

=== Career ===
In 1999, he returned to The Open University, this time as a lecturer in the Philosophy Department at the university's main campus in Milton Keynes.

Frankish was a senior member of Robinson College, Cambridge, and acted as a director of studies for the college, overseeing the work of the college's cohort of philosophy students.

He moved to Crete, Greece in 2008. In 2008–2009 he was a visiting researcher in the Department of Philosophy and Social Studies at the University of Crete, and from 2010 he has been an adjunct professor with the university's Brain and Mind Program. In 2017 he rejoined the Sheffield Philosophy Department as an honorary reader.

He has published and edited many books and written twelve articles in refereed journals. As of 2019, his academic papers have over 1,700 citations. In addition to his academic writing, he frequently contributes to Aeon magazine.

In 2021, he and Philip Goff, a colleague who defends the opposing view of panpsychism, started the YouTube channel "Mind Chat" on which they interview significant scientists and philosophers of consciousness, such as Tim O'Connor, Janet Levin, Christof Koch, Anil Seth, Sean Carroll, Donald Hoffman, Annaka Harris and Helen Yetter-Chappell.

== Views ==
=== Illusionism ===
Frankish is known for espousing the view that phenomenality is an introspective illusion. "We humans have learned a variety of subtle but powerful tricks — strategies of self-control, self-manipulation, and extended problem-solving — which vastly extend the power of our biological brains and give us the sense of having a unified, phenomenally conscious mind, self, or soul."

Early in his career he took a "robustly materialist stance" and attempted to rebut the zombie argument popularized by David Chalmers. In 2007, when he wrote the "Anti-Zombie Argument", he endorsed a weak form of realism about qualia. In later work, however, he rejected phenomenal realism altogether, arguing that "materialists should be thoroughgoing eliminativists about qualia". He called this stance "illusionism."

He defended this position in the 2014 'consciousness cruise' off Greenland sponsored by Dimitri Volkov and the Moscow Center for Consciousness Studies. It was a floating conference that featured prominent philosophers of mind such as David Chalmers, Paul Churchland, Patricia Churchland, Andy Clark, Daniel Dennett, Philip Goff, Nicholas Humphrey, Jesse Prinz, and Derk Pereboom.

In 2016 he wrote a target article for a special issue of the Journal of Consciousness Studies, which included many responses by both supporters and critics of the position.

In 2019, William Ramsey summarized the eliminative materialist argument thusly:

What is real are quasi-phenomenal properties—the non-phenomenal properties of inner states that are detected by introspection and misrepresented as phenomenal.

In 2020, Frankish summed up the position:

Illusionists do not deny the existence of consciousness, but they do offer a different account of what consciousness is. They reject the view that it consists in private mental qualities and argue that it involves being related to the world through a web of informational sensitivities and reactions. They hold that mental qualities are a sort of illusion, and they respond to the objection that this claim is circular by pointing out that illusions can be understood in informational/reactive terms.

==== Response ====
In a follow-up to his target article in the Journal of Consciousness Studies, Frankish summarized the reactions to his article. He labeled as "sceptics" Susan Blackmore, Nicholas Humphrey, Pete Mandik, and Eric Schwitzgebel. In the category of "opponents" he included thinkers such as Katalin Balog, Philip Goff, Martine Nida-Rümelin, and Jesse Prinz. Additionally, Paul Boghossian has argued that eliminative materialism is self-refuting, since the theory itself presupposes the existence of mental phenomena.

Jesse Prinz sought to rebut Frankish's illusionism from the perspective of reductive realism. He asserted that illusionism either collapses into realism or introduces a deep puzzle similar to the hard problem of consciousness. Prinz concludes "that reductive realism is more compelling". Galen Strawson called it the silliest claim ever made and compared it to Flat Eartherism.

Frankish counts Daniel Dennett, Jay Garfield, Georges Rey, Amber Ross and James Tartaglia as "advocates", and amongst the "explorers" of this idea, he counts François Kammerer, Michael Graziano, Nicole Marinsek, Derk Pereboom and Michael Gazzaniga.

=== Other interests ===
Frankish has published papers on the semantics of indirect discourse and conversational implicature (with Maria Kasmirli) and co-edited a volume of research papers in philosophy of action, New Waves in Philosophy of Action.

== Conferences organized ==
Frankish has co-organized two academic conferences.

In Two Minds conference, Cambridge 2006
An interdisciplinary conference on dual-process theories of reasoning and rationality, organized by the Department of Philosophy at the Open University, and held at Fitzwilliam College Cambridge on 5–7 July 2006.Organized by Keith Frankish and Carolyn Price of The Open University and Jonathan Evans from the University of Plymouth.

Phenomenality and Intentionality conference, Crete 2012
An international conference on the relation between the phenomenal and intentional contents of experience, co-sponsored by the University of Crete's Brain and Mind Programme and Department of Philosophy and Social Studies and held at the Historical Museum of Crete, Heraklion, Crete, Greece, from Tuesday 12 June to Thursday 14 June 2012. Organized by Keith Frankish (The Open University & University of Crete) and Maria Venieri (The University of Crete).

== Selected publications ==
Books

- Mind and Supermind (2004) ISBN 0521038111
- Consciousness (2005) ISBN 0749296453
- In Two Minds: Dual Processes and Beyond (2009) ISBN 0199230161
- New Waves in Philosophy of Action (2010) ISBN 0230230601
- The Cambridge Handbook of Cognitive Science (2012) ISBN 0521691907
- The Cambridge Handbook of Artificial Intelligence (2014) ISBN 0521691915
- Cognitive Unconscious and Human Intelligence (2016) ISBN 0262034085
- Illusionism as a Theory of Consciousness (2017) ISBN 1845409574
- Consciousness: The Basics (2021) ISBN 113865597X

== See also ==
- Consciousness Explained
