= Eliminative materialism =

Philosophical view that some states of mind, as commonly understood, do not exist

Eliminative materialism (also called eliminativism) is a materialist position in philosophy of mind that expresses the idea that the majority of mental states in folk psychology do not exist. Some supporters of eliminativism argue that no coherent neural basis will be found for many everyday psychological concepts such as belief or desire, since they are poorly defined. The argument is that psychological concepts of behavior and experience should be judged by how well they reduce to the biological level. Other versions entail the nonexistence of conscious mental states such as pain and visual perceptions.

Eliminativism about a class of entities is the view that the class of entities does not exist. For example, materialism tends to be eliminativist about the soul; modern chemists are eliminativist about phlogiston; modern biologists are eliminativist about élan vital; and modern physicists are eliminativist about luminiferous ether. Eliminative materialism is the relatively new (1960s–70s) idea that certain classes of mental entities that common sense takes for granted, such as beliefs, desires, and the subjective sensation of pain, do not exist. The most common versions are eliminativism about propositional attitudes, as expressed by Paul and Patricia Churchland, and eliminativism about qualia (subjective interpretations about particular instances of subjective experience), as expressed by Daniel Dennett, Georges Rey, and Jacy Reese Anthis.

In the context of materialist understandings of psychology, eliminativism is the opposite of reductive materialism, according to which mental states as conventionally understood do exist, and directly correspond to the physical state of the nervous system. According to revisionary materialism, an intermediate position, the mental state in question will prove to be somewhat reducible to physical phenomena—with some changes needed to the commonsense concept.

Since eliminative materialism arguably claims that future research will fail to find a neuronal basis for various mental phenomena, it may need to wait for science to progress further. One might question the position on these grounds, but philosophers like Churchland argue that eliminativism is often necessary in order to open the minds of thinkers to new evidence and better explanations. Views closely related to eliminativism include illusionism and quietism.

== Overview ==
Various arguments have been made for and against eliminative materialism over the last 50 years. The view's history can be traced to David Hume, who rejected the idea of the "self" on the grounds that it was not based on any impression. Most arguments for the view are based on the assumption that people's commonsense view of the mind is actually an implicit theory. It is to be compared and contrasted with other scientific theories in its explanatory success, accuracy, and ability to predict the future. Eliminativists argue that commonsense "folk" psychology has failed and will eventually need to be replaced by explanations derived from neuroscience. These philosophers therefore tend to emphasize the importance of neuroscientific research as well as developments in artificial intelligence.

Philosophers who argue against eliminativism may take several approaches. Simulation theorists, like Robert Gordon and Alvin Goldman, argue that folk psychology is not a theory, but depends on internal simulation of others, and therefore is not subject to falsification in the same way that theories are. Jerry Fodor, among others, argues that folk psychology is, in fact, a successful (even indispensable) theory. Another view is that eliminativism assumes the existence of the beliefs and other entities it seeks to "eliminate" and is thus self-refuting.

Schematic overview: Eliminativists suggest that some sciences can be reduced (blue), but that theories that are in principle irreducible will eventually be eliminated (orange).

Eliminativism maintains that the commonsense understanding of the mind is mistaken, and that neuroscience will one day reveal that mental states talked about in everyday discourse, using words such as "intend", "believe", "desire", and "love", do not refer to anything real. Because of the inadequacy of natural languages, people mistakenly think that they have such beliefs and desires. Some eliminativists, such as Frank Jackson, claim that consciousness does not exist except as an epiphenomenon of brain function; others, such as Georges Rey, claim that the concept will eventually be eliminated as neuroscience progresses. Consciousness and folk psychology are separate issues, and it is possible to take an eliminative stance on one but not the other. The roots of eliminativism go back to the writings of Wilfred Sellars, W.V.O. Quine, Paul Feyerabend, and Richard Rorty. The term "eliminative materialism" was first introduced by James Cornman in 1968 while describing a version of physicalism endorsed by Rorty. The later Ludwig Wittgenstein was also an important inspiration for eliminativism, particularly with his attack on "private objects" as "grammatical fictions".

Early eliminativists such as Rorty and Feyerabend often confused two different notions of the sort of elimination that the term "eliminative materialism" entailed. On the one hand, they claimed, the cognitive sciences that will ultimately give people a correct account of the mind's workings will not employ terms that refer to commonsense mental states like beliefs and desires; these states will not be part of the ontology of a mature cognitive science. But critics immediately countered that this view was indistinguishable from identity theory of mind. Quine himself wondered what exactly was so eliminative about eliminative materialism:

Is physicalism a repudiation of mental objects after all, or a theory of them? Does it repudiate the mental state of pain or anger in favor of its physical concomitant, or does it identify the mental state with a state of the physical organism (and so a state of the physical organism with the mental state)?

On the other hand, the same philosophers claimed that commonsense mental states simply do not exist. But critics pointed out that eliminativists could not have it both ways: either mental states exist and will ultimately be explained in terms of lower-level neurophysiological processes, or they do not. Modern eliminativists have much more clearly expressed the view that mental phenomena simply do not exist and will eventually be eliminated from people's thinking about the brain in the same way that demons have been eliminated from people's thinking about mental illness and psychopathology.

While it was a minority view in the 1960s, eliminative materialism gained prominence and acceptance during the 1980s. Proponents of this view, such as B.F. Skinner, often made parallels to previous superseded scientific theories (such as that of the four humours, the phlogiston theory of combustion, and the vital force theory of life) that have all been successfully eliminated in attempting to establish their thesis about the nature of the mental. In these cases, science has not produced more detailed versions or reductions of these theories, but rejected them altogether as obsolete. Radical behaviorists, such as Skinner, argued that folk psychology is already obsolete and should be replaced by descriptions of histories of reinforcement and punishment. Such views were eventually abandoned. Patricia and Paul Churchland argued that folk psychology will be gradually replaced as neuroscience matures.

Eliminativism is not only motivated by philosophical considerations, but is also a prediction about what form future scientific theories will take. Eliminativist philosophers therefore tend to be concerned with data from the relevant brain and cognitive sciences. In addition, because eliminativism is essentially predictive in nature, different theorists can and often do predict which aspects of folk psychology will be eliminated from folk psychological vocabulary. None of these philosophers are eliminativists tout court.

Today, the eliminativist view is most closely associated with the Churchlands, who deny the existence of propositional attitudes (a subclass of intentional states), and with Daniel Dennett, who is generally considered an eliminativist about qualia and phenomenal aspects of consciousness. One way to summarize the difference between the Churchlands' view and Dennett's is that the Churchlands are eliminativists about propositional attitudes, but reductionists about qualia, while Dennett is an anti-reductionist about propositional attitudes and an eliminativist about qualia.

More recently, Brian Tomasik and Jacy Reese Anthis have made various arguments for eliminativism. Elizabeth Irvine has argued that both science and folk psychology do not treat mental states as having phenomenal properties so the hard problem "may not be a genuine problem for non-philosophers (despite its overwhelming obviousness to philosophers), and questions about consciousness may well 'shatter' into more specific questions about particular capacities." In 2022, Anthis published Consciousness Semanticism: A Precise Eliminativist Theory of Consciousness, which asserts that "formal argumentation from precise semantics" dissolves the hard problem because of the contradiction between precision implied in philosophical theory and the vagueness in its definition, which implies there is no fact of the matter for phenomenological consciousness.

== Arguments for eliminativism ==
=== Problems with folk theories ===
Eliminativists such as Paul and Patricia Churchland argue that folk psychology is a fully developed but non-formalized theory of human behavior. It is used to explain and make predictions about human mental states and behavior. This view is often referred to as the theory of mind or just simply theory-theory, for it theorizes the existence of an unacknowledged theory. As a theory in the scientific sense, eliminativists maintain, folk psychology must be evaluated on the basis of its predictive power and explanatory success as a research program for the investigation of the mind/brain.

Such eliminativists have developed different arguments to show that folk psychology is a seriously mistaken theory and should be abolished. They argue that folk psychology excludes from its purview or has traditionally been mistaken about many important mental phenomena that can and are being examined and explained by modern neuroscience. Some examples are dreaming, consciousness, mental disorders, learning processes, and memory abilities. Furthermore, they argue, folk psychology's development in the last 2,500 years has not been significant and it is therefore stagnant. The ancient Greeks already had a folk psychology comparable to modern views. But in contrast to this lack of development, neuroscience is rapidly progressing and, in their view, can explain many cognitive processes that folk psychology cannot.

Folk psychology retains characteristics of now obsolete theories or legends from the past. Ancient societies tried to explain the physical mysteries of nature by ascribing mental conditions to them in such statements as "the sea is angry". Gradually, these everyday folk psychological explanations were replaced by more efficient scientific descriptions. Today, eliminativists argue, there is no reason not to accept an effective scientific account of cognition. If such an explanation existed, then there would be no need for folk-psychological explanations of behavior, and the latter would be eliminated the same way as the mythological explanations the ancients used.

Another line of argument is the meta-induction based on what eliminativists view as the disastrous historical record of folk theories in general. Ancient pre-scientific "theories" of folk biology, folk physics, and folk cosmology have all proven radically wrong. Eliminativists argue the same in the case of folk psychology. There seems no logical basis, to the eliminativist, to make an exception just because folk psychology has lasted longer and is more intuitive or instinctively plausible than other folk theories. Indeed, the eliminativists warn, considerations of intuitive plausibility may be precisely the result of the deeply entrenched nature in society of folk psychology itself. It may be that people's beliefs and other such states are as theory-laden as external perceptions and hence that intuitions will tend to be biased in their favor.

=== Specific problems with folk psychology ===
Much of folk psychology involves the attribution of intentional states (or more specifically as a subclass, propositional attitudes). Eliminativists point out that these states are generally ascribed syntactic and semantic properties. An example of this is the language of thought hypothesis, which attributes a discrete, combinatorial syntax and other linguistic properties to these mental phenomena. Eliminativists argue that such discrete, combinatorial characteristics have no place in neuroscience, which speaks of action potentials, spiking frequencies, and other continuous and distributed effects. Hence, the syntactic structures assumed by folk psychology have no place in such a structure as the brain. To this there have been two responses. On the one hand, some philosophers deny that mental states are linguistic and see this as a straw man argument. The other view is represented by those who subscribe to "a language of thought". They assert that mental states can be multiply realized and that functional characterizations are just higher-level characterizations of what happens at the physical level.

It has also been argued against folk psychology that the intentionality of mental states like belief implies that they have semantic qualities. Specifically, their meaning is determined by the things they are about in the external world. This makes it difficult to explain how they can play the causal roles they are supposed to in cognitive processes.

In recent years, this latter argument has been fortified by the theory of connectionism. Many connectionist models of the brain have been developed in which the processes of language learning and other forms of representation are highly distributed and parallel. This tends to indicate that such discrete and semantically endowed entities as beliefs and desires are unnecessary.

=== Physics eliminates intentionality ===
The problem of intentionality poses a significant challenge to materialist accounts of cognition. If thoughts are neural processes, we must explain how specific neural networks can be "about" external objects or concepts. We can think about Paris, for instance, but there is no clear mechanism by which neurons can represent a city.

Traditional analogies fail to explain this phenomenon. Unlike a photograph, neurons do not physically resemble Paris. Nor can we appeal to conventional symbolism, as we might with a stop sign representing the action of stopping. Such symbols derive their meaning from social agreement and interpretation, which are not applicable to a brain's workings. Attempts to posit a separate neural process that assigns meaning to the "Paris neurons" merely shift the problem without resolving it, as we then need to explain how this secondary process can assign meaning, initiating an infinite regress.

The only way to break this regress is to postulate matter with intrinsic meaning, independent of external interpretation. But our current understanding of physics precludes the existence of such matter. The fundamental particles and forces physics describes have no inherent semantic properties that could ground intentionality. This physical limitation presents a formidable obstacle to materialist theories of mind that rely on neural representations. It suggests that intentionality, as commonly understood, may be incompatible with a purely physicalist worldview. This suggests that our folk psychological concepts of intentional states will be eliminated in light of scientific understanding.

=== Evolution eliminates intentionality ===
Another argument for eliminative materialism stems from evolutionary theory. This argument suggests that natural selection, the process shaping our neural architecture, cannot solve the "disjunction problem", which challenges the idea that neural states can store specific, determinate propositional content. Natural selection, as Darwin described it, is primarily a process of selection against rather than selection for traits. It passively filters out traits below a certain fitness threshold rather than actively choosing beneficial ones. This lack of foresight or purpose in evolution becomes problematic when considering how neural states could represent unique propositions.

The disjunction problem arises from the fact that natural selection cannot discriminate between coextensive properties. For example, consider two genes close together on a chromosome. One gene might code for a beneficial trait, while the other codes for a neutral or even harmful trait. Due to their proximity, these genes are often inherited together, a phenomenon known as genetic linkage. Natural selection cannot distinguish between these linked traits; it can only act on their combined effect on the organism's fitness. Only random processes like genetic crossover—where chromosomes exchange genetic material during reproduction—can break these linkages. Until such a break occurs, natural selection remains "blind" to the linked genes' individual effects.

Eliminativists argue that if natural selection—the process responsible for shaping our neural architecture—cannot solve the disjunction problem, then our brains cannot store unique, non-disjunctive propositions, as required by folk psychology. Instead, they suggest that neural states contain inherently disjunctive or indeterminate content. This argument leads eliminativists to reject the notion that neural states have specific, determinate informational content corresponding to the discrete, non-disjunctive propositions of folk psychology. This evolutionary argument adds to the eliminativist case that our commonsense understanding of beliefs, desires, and other propositional attitudes is flawed and should be replaced by a neuroscientific account that acknowledges the indeterminate nature of neural representations.

== Arguments against eliminativism ==
=== Intentionality and consciousness are identical ===
Some eliminativists reject intentionality while accepting the existence of qualia. Other eliminativists reject qualia while accepting intentionality. Many philosophers argue that intentionality cannot exist without consciousness and vice versa, and so any philosopher who accepts one while rejecting the other is being inconsistent. They argue that, to be consistent, one must accept both qualia and intentionality or reject them both. Philosophers who argue for such a position include Philip Goff, Terence Horgan, Uriah Kriegal, and John Tienson. The philosopher Keith Frankish accepts the existence of intentionality but holds to illusionism about consciousness because he rejects qualia. Goff notes that beliefs are a kind of propositional thought.

=== Intuitive reservations ===
The thesis of eliminativism seems so obviously wrong to many critics, who find it undeniable that people know immediately and indubitably that they have minds, that argumentation seems unnecessary. This sort of intuition-pumping is illustrated by asking what happens when one asks oneself honestly if one has mental states. Eliminativists object to such a rebuttal of their position by claiming that intuitions often are mistaken. Analogies from the history of science are frequently invoked to buttress this observation: it may appear obvious that the sun travels around the earth, for example, but this was nevertheless proved wrong. Similarly, it may appear obvious that apart from neural events there are also mental conditions, but that could be false.

But even if one accepts the susceptibility to error of people's intuitions, the objection can be reformulated: if the existence of mental conditions seems perfectly obvious and is central to our conception of the world, then enormously strong arguments are needed to deny their existence. Furthermore, these arguments, to be consistent, must be formulated in a way that does not presuppose the existence of entities like "mental states", "logical arguments", and "ideas", lest they be self-contradictory. Those who accept this objection say that the arguments for eliminativism are far too weak to establish such a radical claim and that there is thus no reason to accept eliminativism.

=== Self-refutation ===
Some philosophers, such as Paul Boghossian, have attempted to show that eliminativism is in some sense self-refuting, since the theory presupposes the existence of mental phenomena. If eliminativism is true, then eliminativists must accept an intentional property like truth, supposing that in order to assert something one must believe it. Hence, for eliminativism to be asserted as a thesis, the eliminativist must believe that it is true; if so, there are beliefs, and eliminativism is false.

Georges Rey and Michael Devitt reply to this objection by invoking deflationary semantic theories that avoid analyzing predicates like "x is true" as expressing a real property. They are instead construed as logical devices, so that asserting that a sentence is true is just a quoted way of asserting the sentence itself. To say "'God exists' is true" is just to say "God exists". This way, Rey and Devitt argue, insofar as dispositional replacements of "claims" and deflationary accounts of "true" are coherent, eliminativism is not self-refuting.

=== Correspondence theory of truth ===
Several philosophers, such as the Churchlands and Alex Rosenberg, have developed a theory of structural resemblance or physical isomorphism that could explain how neural states can instantiate truth within the correspondence theory of truth. Neuroscientists use the word "representation" to identify the neural circuits' encoding of inputs from the peripheral nervous system in, for example, the visual cortex. But they use the word without according it any commitment to intentional content. In fact, there is an explicit commitment to describing neural representations in terms of structures of neural axonal discharges that are physically isomorphic to the inputs that cause them. Suppose that this way of understanding representation in the brain is preserved in the long-term course of research providing an understanding of how the brain processes and stores information. Then there will be considerable evidence that the brain is a neural network whose physical structure is identical to the aspects of its environment it tracks and whose representations of these features consist in this physical isomorphism.

Experiments in the 1980s with macaques isolated the structural resemblance between input vibrations the finger feels, measured in cycles per second, and representations of them in neural circuits, measured in action-potential spikes per second. This resemblance between two easily measured variables makes it unsurprising that they would be among the first such structural resemblances to be discovered. Macaques and humans have the same peripheral nervous system sensitivities and can make the same tactile discriminations. Subsequent research into neural processing has increasingly vindicated a structural resemblance or physical isomorphism approach to how information enters the brain and is stored and deployed.

This isomorphism between brain and world is not a matter of some relationship between reality and a map of reality stored in the brain. Maps require interpretation if they are to be about what they map, and eliminativism and neuroscience share a commitment to explaining the appearance of aboutness by purely physical relationships between informational states in the brain and what they "represent". The brain-to-world relationship must be a matter of physical isomorphism—sameness of form, outline, structure—that does not require interpretation.

This machinery can be applied to make "sense" of eliminativism in terms of the sentences eliminativists say or write. When we say that eliminativism is true, that the brain does not store information in the form of unique sentences, statements, expressing propositions or anything like them, there is a set of neural circuits that has no trouble coherently carrying this information. There is a possible translation manual that will guide us back from the vocalization or inscription eliminativists express to these circuits. These neural structures will differ from the neural circuits of those who explicitly reject eliminativism in ways that our translation manual will presumably shed some light on, giving us a neurological handle on disagreement and on the structural differences in neural circuitry, if any, between asserting p and asserting not-p when p expresses the eliminativist thesis.

==== Criticism ====
The physical isomorphism approach faces indeterminacy problems. Any given structure in the brain will be causally related to, and isomorphic in various respects to, many different structures in external reality. But we cannot discriminate the one it is intended to represent or that it is supposed to be true "of". These locutions are heavy with just the intentionality that eliminativism denies. Here is a problem of underdetermination or holism that eliminativism shares with intentionality-dependent theories of mind. Here, we can only invoke pragmatic criteria for discriminating successful structural representations—the substitution of true ones for unsuccessful ones—the ones we used to call false.

Dennett notes that it is possible that such indeterminacy problems remain only hypothetical, not occurring in reality. He constructs a 4x4 "Quinian crossword puzzle" with words that must satisfy both the across and down definitions. Since there are multiple constraints on this puzzle, there is one solution. Thus we can think of the brain and its relation to the external world as a very large crossword puzzle that must satisfy exceedingly many constraints to which there is only one possible solution. Therefore, in reality we may end up with only one physical isomorphism between the brain and the external world.

=== Pragmatic theory of truth ===
When indeterminacy problems arose because the brain is physically isomorphic to multiple structures of the external world, it was urged that a pragmatic approach be used to resolve the problem. Another approach argues that the pragmatic theory of truth should be used from the start to decide whether certain neural circuits store true information about the external world. Pragmatism was founded by Charles Sanders Peirce and William James, and later refined by our understanding of the philosophy of science. According to pragmatism, to say that general relativity is true is to say that it makes more accurate predictions than other theories (Newtonian mechanics, Aristotle's physics, etc.). If computer circuits lack intentionality and do not store information using propositions, then in what sense can computer A have true information about the world while computer B lacks it? If the computers were instantiated in autonomous cars, we could test whether A or B successfully completes a cross-country road trip. If A succeeds while B fails, the pragmatist can say that A holds true information about the world, because A's information allows it to make more accurate predictions (relative to B) about the world and to move around its environment more successfully. Similarly, if brain A has information that enables the biological organism to make more accurate predictions about the world and helps the organism successfully move around in the environment, then A has true information about the world. Although not advocates of eliminativism, John Shook and Tibor Solymosi argue that pragmatism is a promising program for understanding advancements in neuroscience and integrating them into a philosophical picture of the world.

==== Criticism ====
The reason naturalism cannot be pragmatic in its epistemology starts with its metaphysics. Science tells us that we are components of the natural realm, indeed latecomers in the 13.8-billion-year-old universe. The universe was not organized around our needs and abilities, and what works for us is just a set of contingent facts that could have been otherwise. Once we have begun discovering things about the universe that work for us, science sets out to explain why they do. It is clear that one explanation for why things work for us that we must rule out as unilluminating, indeed question-begging, is that they work for us because they work for us. If something works for us, enables us to meet our needs and wants, there must be an explanation reflecting facts about us and the world that produce the needs and the means to satisfy them.

The explanation of why scientific methods work for us must be a causal explanation. It must show what facts about reality make the methods we employ to acquire knowledge suitable for doing so. The explanation must show that our methods work — for example, have reliable technological application — not by coincidence, still less miracle or accident. That means there must be some facts, events, processes that operate in reality and brought about our pragmatic success. The demand that success be explained is a consequence of science's epistemology. If the truth of such explanations consists in the fact that they work for us (as pragmatism requires), then the explanation of why our scientific methods work is that they work. That is not a satisfying explanation.

=== Efficacy of folk psychology ===
Some philosophers argue that folk psychology is quite successful. Simulation theorists doubt that people's understanding of the mental can be explained in terms of a theory at all. Rather they argue that people's understanding of others is based on internal simulations of how they would act and respond in similar situations. Jerry Fodor believes in folk psychology's success as a theory, because it makes for an effective way of communication in everyday life that can be implemented with few words. Such effectiveness could not be achieved with complex neuroscientific terminology.

== Qualia ==
Another problem for the eliminativist is the consideration that human beings undergo subjective experiences and hence their conscious mental states have qualia. Since qualia are generally regarded as characteristics of mental states, their existence does not seem compatible with eliminativism. Eliminativists such as Dennett and Rey respond by rejecting qualia. Opponents of eliminativism see this response as problematic, since many claim that existence of qualia is perfectly obvious. Many philosophers consider the "elimination" of qualia implausible, if not incomprehensible. They assert that, for instance, the existence of pain is simply beyond denial.

Admitting that the existence of qualia seems obvious, Dennett nevertheless holds that "qualia" is a theoretical term from an outdated metaphysics stemming from Cartesian intuitions. He argues that a precise analysis shows that the term is in the long run empty and full of contradictions. Eliminativism's claim about qualia is that there is no unbiased evidence for such experiences when regarded as something more than propositional attitudes. In other words, it does not deny that pain exists, but holds that it exists independently of its effect on behavior. Influenced by Wittgenstein's Philosophical Investigations, Dennett and Rey have defended eliminativism about qualia even when other aspects of the mental are accepted.

=== Quining qualia ===
Dennett offers philosophical thought experiments to argue that qualia do not exist. First he lists five properties of qualia:

1. They are "directly" or "immediately" graspable during our conscious experiences.
2. We are infallible about them.
3. They are "private": no one can directly access anyone else's qualia.
4. They are ineffable.
5. They are "intrinsic" and "simple" or "unanalyzable."

==== Inverted qualia ====
The first thought experiment Dennett uses to demonstrate that qualia lack the listed necessary properties to exist involves inverted qualia: consider two people who have different qualia but the same external physical behavior. But now the qualia supporter can present an "intrapersonal" variation. Suppose a neurosurgeon works on your brain and you discover that grass now looks red. Would this not be a case where we could confirm the reality of qualia—by noticing how the qualia have changed while every other aspect of our conscious experience remains the same? Not quite, Dennett replies via the next "intuition pump" (his term for an intuition-based thought experiment), "alternative neurosurgery". There are two different ways the neurosurgeon might have accomplished the inversion. First, they might have tinkered with something "early on", so that signals from the eye when you look at grass contain the information "red" rather than "green". This would result in genuine qualia inversion. But they might instead have tinkered with your memory. Here your qualia would remain the same, but your memory would be altered so that your current green experience would contradict your earlier memories of grass. You would still feel that the color of grass had changed, but here the qualia have not changed, but your memories have. Would you be able to tell which of these scenarios is correct? No: your perceptual experience tells you that something has changed but not whether your qualia have changed. Dennett concludes, since (by hypothesis) the two surgical procedures can yield exactly the same introspective effects while only one inverts the qualia, nothing in the subject's experience can favor one hypothesis over the other. So unless he seeks outside help, the state of his own qualia must be as unknowable to him as the state of anyone else's. It is questionable, in short, that we have direct, infallible access to our conscious experience.

==== The experienced beer drinker ====
Dennett's second thought experiment involves beer. Many people think of beer as an acquired taste: one's first sip is often unpleasant, but one gradually comes to enjoy it. But wait, Dennett asks—what is the "it" here? Compare the flavor of that first taste with the flavor now. Does the beer taste exactly the same both then and now, only now you like that taste whereas before you disliked it? Or is it that the way beer tastes gradually shifts—so that the taste you did not like at the beginning is not the same taste you now like? In fact most people simply cannot tell which is the correct analysis. But that is to give up again on the idea that we have special and infallible access to our qualia. Further, when forced to choose, many people feel that the second analysis is more plausible. But then if one's reactions to an experience are in any way constitutive of it, the experience is not so "intrinsic" after all—and another qualia property falls.

==== Inverted goggles ====
Dennett's third thought experiment involves inverted goggles. Scientists have devised special eyeglasses that invert up and down for the wearer. When you put them on, everything looks upside down. When subjects first put them on, they can barely walk around without stumbling. But after subjects wear them for a while, something surprising occurs. They adapt and become able to walk around as easily as before. When you ask them whether they adapted by re-inverting their visual field or simply got used to walking around in an upside-down world, they cannot say. So as in our beer-drinking case, either we simply do not have the special, infallible access to our qualia that would allow us to distinguish the two cases or the way the world looks to us is actually a function of how we respond to the world—in which case qualia are not "intrinsic" properties of experience.

==== Criticism ====
Edward Feser objects to Dennett's position as follows. That you need to appeal to third-person neurological evidence to determine whether your memory of your qualia has been tampered with does not seem to show that your qualia themselves—past or present—can be known only by appealing to that evidence. You might still be directly aware of your qualia from the first-person, subjective point of view even if you do not know whether they are the same as the qualia you had yesterday—just as you might really be aware of the article in front of you even if you do not know whether it is the same as the article you saw yesterday. Questions about memory do not necessarily bear on the nature of your awareness of objects present here and now (even if they bear on what you can justifiably claim to know about such objects), whatever those objects happen to be. Dennett's assertion that scientific objectivity requires appealing exclusively to third-person evidence appears mistaken. What scientific objectivity requires is not denial of the first-person subjective point of view but rather a means of communicating inter-subjectively about what one can grasp only from that point of view. Given the relational structure first-person phenomena like qualia appear to exhibit—a structure that Carnap devoted great effort to elucidating—such a means seems available: we can communicate what we know about qualia in terms of their structural relations to one another. Dennett fails to see that qualia can be essentially subjective and still relational or non-intrinsic, and thus communicable. This communicability ensures that claims about qualia are epistemologically objective; that is, they can in principle be grasped and evaluated by all competent observers even though they are claims about phenomena that are arguably not metaphysically objective, i.e., about entities that exist only as grasped by a subject of experience. It is only the former sort of objectivity that science requires. It does not require the latter, and cannot plausibly require it if the first-person realm of qualia is what we know better than anything else.

== Illusionism ==
Illusionism is an active program within eliminative materialism to explain phenomenal consciousness as an illusion. It is promoted by the philosophers Daniel Dennett, Keith Frankish, and Jay Garfield, and the neuroscientist Michael Graziano. Graziano has advanced the attention schema theory of consciousness and postulates that consciousness is an illusion. According to David Chalmers, proponents argue that once we can explain consciousness as an illusion without the need for a realist view of consciousness, we can construct a debunking argument against realist views of consciousness. This line of argument draws from other debunking arguments like the evolutionary debunking argument in the field of metaethics. Such arguments note that morality is explained by evolution without positing moral realism, so there is a sufficient basis to debunk moral realism.

=== Criticism ===
Illusionists generally hold that once it is explained why people believe and say they are conscious, the hard problem of consciousness will dissolve. Chalmers agrees that a mechanism for these beliefs and reports can and should be identified using the standard methods of physical science, but disagrees that this would support illusionism, saying that the datum illusionism fails to account for is not reports of consciousness but rather first-person consciousness itself. He separates consciousness from beliefs and reports about consciousness, but holds that a fully satisfactory theory of consciousness should explain how the two are "inextricably intertwined" so that their alignment does not require an inexplicable coincidence. Illusionism has also been criticized by the philosopher Jesse Prinz.

== See also ==
- Attention schema theory
- Blindsight
- Constructivist epistemology
- Cotard delusion
- Deconstructivism
- Epiphenomenalism
- Functionalism
- Mind–body problem
- Monism
- New mysterianism
- Nihilism
- Phenomenology
- Physicalism
- Principle of locality
- Property dualism
- Reductionism
- Scientism
- Substance dualism
- Vertiginous question
