= Illusionism (free will) =

Metaphysical theory

Illusionism is a metaphysical theory about free will first propounded by professor Saul Smilansky of the University of Haifa. Although there exists a theory of consciousness bearing the same name (illusionism), the two theories are concerned with different subjects.

== Definition ==
Illusionism as discussed here, holds that people have illusory beliefs about free will. Furthermore, it holds that it is both of key importance and morally right that people not be disabused of these beliefs, because the illusion has benefits both to individuals and to society. Belief in hard incompatibilism, argues Smilansky, removes an individual's basis for a sense of self-worth in his or her own achievements. It is "extremely damaging to our view of ourselves, to our sense of achievement, worth, and self-respect".

Neither compatibilism nor hard determinism are the whole story, according to Smilansky, and there exists an ultimate perspective in which some parts of compatibilism are valid and some parts of hard determinism are valid. However, Smilansky asserts, the nature of what he terms the fundamental dualism between hard determinism and compatibilism is a morally undesirable one, in that both beliefs, in their absolute forms, have adverse consequences. The distinctions between choice and luck made by compatibilism are important, but wholly undermined by hard determinism. But, conversely, hard determinism undermines the morally important notions of justice and respect, leaving them nothing more than "shallow" notions.

== Critical reception ==
Smilansky's thesis is considered a radical one, and other philosophers disagree with it. Professor Derk Pereboom of Cornell University, for example, denies that hard incompatibilism necessarily does away with self-worth, because to a large extent that sense of self-worth isn't related to will at all, let alone to free will. Aspects of worthiness such as natural beauty, native physical ability, and intelligence are not voluntary. Moreover, it is a basic and common assumption that villains are never worthy of happiness, for instance. James Lenman takes a similar line, arguing that Smilansky's expression of the problems is overstated. The problems that he presents are less fundamentally metaphysical than simply practical in nature.
