= Smilansky =

Smilansky may refer to:

- Moshe Smilansky (1874–1953), Russian Empire-born Israeli pioneer of the First Aliyah, and a Zionist leader
- Noemi Smilansky (1916–2016), Austro-Hungarian Empire-born Israeli painter, illustrator, and printmaker
- Sara Smilansky (1922–2006), Israeli psychologist, professor at Tel Aviv University
- Saul Smilansky (born 1961), Israeli philosopher
- S. Yizhar (1916–2006), né Yizhar Smilansky, Ottoman Empire-born Israeli writer
