= Bruce Waller =

American philosopher (1946-2023)

Bruce N. Waller
- Born: August 20, 1946
- Died: February 8, 2023 (Age 76)

Education
- Education: University of North Carolina at Chapel Hill PhD 1979

Philosophical work
- Institutions: Youngstown State University
- Notable ideas: Free will Moral responsibility (action theory)
- Website: www.brucenwaller.com

Bruce Waller (August 20, 1946 – February 8, 2023) was a contemporary American philosopher notable for his theories about the nature of free will and its implications for human society. He was a philosophy professor at Youngstown State University from 1990 until he retired in 2019. Waller died on February 8, 2023, at the age of 76.

== Philosophy ==
Waller is a determinist who believes that everything that happens, had to happen, and could not have happened otherwise, and that all events are necessitated to happen by the process of cause and effect, that is, that past, present, and future consist of an essentially unbreakable chain of circumstances of which no single link in such a chain could possibly be avoided or altered. Since he believes that determinism and moral responsibility are mutually incompatible, he has sometimes been identified as an incompatibilist.

In Against Moral Responsibility (2011), he noticed, despite growing scientific evidence for determinism, that people cling steadfastly to the free-will based idea of moral responsibility. Moral responsibility assumes that humans are active causal agents who can choose to do one of two different alternatives, and therefore are morally deserving of praise or blame or reward or punishment for their choices. He views praise and blame and other related notions as being illogical in a scientific sense and impossible to justify; for example, it does not make sense to blame a person for doing what they did, if they couldn't have helped it, he argues. Waller's explanation of the entrenchment of a belief in moral responsibility in the popular consciousness is partly that there are systems of interlocking beliefs connecting free will and praise and blame and belief in a just world, and that these beliefs, taken together, reinforce the validity of punishment and serve as underpinnings of the criminal justice system. He argues that this current worldview is incorrect and should be examined critically.

Waller argues that belief in free will and moral responsibility brings a slew of problems, particularly a miserable world for the less fortunate. In particular, it leads to multiple "doses" of unfairness:

1. poor initial developmental luck for the less fortunate
2. belief that they were somehow responsible for their bad luck
3. widening social inequalities

That there is no ultimate free will does not nullify human freedom of choice, according to Waller. In his 2015 book Restorative Free Will, he made a case that even while everything is determined, humans have the cognitive capacity to generate options to cope with specific situations, and further, that humans must use this capacity by choosing the best options. He argues that this sense of free will, meaning freedom of choice without external constraint, is consistent with determinism, and his view has been gaining critical traction among scholars and in the media. In his view, "we should focus on our ability, in any given setting, to generate a wide range of options for ourselves, and to decide among them without external constraint." Accordingly, in Waller's view, it is proper to discourage people from being lazy, but wrong to blame them for their laziness since the reason for their laziness can be found in a deterministic assessment of the "blind lottery of biology and environment", that is, it's not their fault.

Critics of Waller's view have maintained that if people abandon their notions of free will and moral responsibility, that people may be unable to restrain themselves and they may misbehave, or engage in criminality or vice, since they will know that whatever they will do, that they will be held as blameless. In contrast, Waller argues that jettisoning moral responsibility will not permit people to behave immorally or without any consideration of consequences; rather, he argues that a better world will result. He explained that accountability will continue regardless, and he illustrated the point with an example: "If I borrow a large sum of money from a friend, and then hit financial hardship and am unable to repay the loan, it is not as if I am suddenly relieved of my moral obligation to repay." Waller disagrees with scholars such as Clemson's Ryan Lake, who argues that a belief in determinism prevents people from feeling "true apology" or sincere regret since that requires taking or accepting responsibility for one's failings. Waller disagrees, saying that apologies and regret are still consistent with a deterministic world. In short, abolishing ultimate moral responsibility will not have the dire consequences which some critics hypothesize, according to Waller.

Waller believes no one deserves harmful treatment, including convicted criminals, although he realizes that some people must be locked behind bars for pragmatic reasons of public safety. He believes punishment should be minimized since it often backfires, and sometimes encourages subsequent harmful behavior. He believes that an acceptance of determinism would bring about the positive outcome of making people less punishment-oriented and less retributive, and that human responses to the problem of crime would become more practical and beneficial overall.

Waller's account of free will still leads to a very different view of justice and responsibility than most people hold today. No one has caused himself: No one chose his genes or the environment into which he was born. Therefore no one bears ultimate responsibility for who he is and what he does. ... And when the threat of punishment is necessary as a deterrent, it will in many cases be balanced with efforts to strengthen, rather than undermine, the capacities for autonomy ...

— Philosopher Stephen Cave in The Atlantic, 2016

== Publications ==
- Critical Thinking: Consider the Verdict, 2023 (7th edition), Waveland Press
- Free Will, Moral Responsibility, and the Desire to Be a God, 2020, Rowman & Littlefield
- The Injustice of Punishment, 2020, Routledge
- Restorative Free Will: Back to the Biological Base, 2015, Lexington Books
- The Stubborn System of Moral Responsibility 2014, MIT Press
- Congenial Debates on Controversial Questions, 2013, Pearson
- Against Moral Responsibility, MIT Press, Cambridge, Massachusetts, 2011
- Consider Philosophy, 2010, Pearson
- Consider Ethics: Theory, Readings, and Contemporary Issues (3rd Edition) , 2010, Pearson
- You Decide! Current Debates in Criminal Justice (anthology), 2008, Pearson
- Coffee and Philosophy: A Conversational Introduction to Philosophy with Readings, 2005, Pearson
- The Natural Selection of Autonomy, 1998, SUNY Press
- Freedom Without Responsibility, 1990, Temple University Press
