= Moral responsibility =

Concept in ethics

In philosophy, moral responsibility is the status of morally deserving praise, blame, reward, or punishment for an act or omission in accordance with one's moral obligations. Deciding what (if anything) counts as "morally obligatory" is a principal concern of ethics.

Philosophers refer to people who have moral responsibility for an action as "moral agents". Agents have the capability to reflect upon their situation, to form intentions about how they will act, and then to carry out that action. The notion of free will has become an important issue in the debate on whether individuals are ever morally responsible for their actions and, if so, in what sense. Incompatibilists regard determinism as being at odds with free will, whereas compatibilists think the two can coexist.

Moral responsibility does not necessarily equate to legal responsibility. A person is legally responsible for an event when a legal system is liable to penalise that person for that event. Although it may often be the case that when a person is morally responsible for an act, they are also legally responsible for it, the two states do not always coincide.

Prominent promoters of the concept of personal responsibility (or some popularization thereof) may include (for example) parents, managers, politicians, technocrats, large-group awareness trainings (LGATs), and religious groups.

Some see individual responsibility as an important component of neoliberalism.

== Philosophical stance ==
Various philosophical positions exist, disagreeing over determinism and free will.

Depending on how a philosopher conceives of free will, they will have different views on moral responsibility.

=== Metaphysical libertarianism ===
Metaphysical libertarians think actions are not always causally determined, allowing for the possibility of free will and thus moral responsibility. All libertarians are also incompatibilists; for they think that if causal determinism were true of human action, people would not have free will. Accordingly, some libertarians subscribe to the principle of alternate possibilities, which posits that moral responsibility requires that people could have acted differently.

Phenomenological considerations are sometimes invoked by incompatibilists to defend a libertarian position. In daily life, we feel as though choosing otherwise is a viable option. Although this feeling does not firmly establish the existence of free will, some incompatibilists claim the phenomenological feeling of alternate possibilities is a prerequisite for free will.

Jean-Paul Sartre suggested that people sometimes avoid incrimination and responsibility by hiding behind determinism: "we are always ready to take refuge in a belief in determinism if this freedom weighs upon us or if we need an excuse".

A similar view is that individual moral culpability lies in individual character. That is, a person with the character of a murderer has no choice other than to murder, but can still be punished because it is right to punish those of bad character. How one's character was determined is irrelevant from this perspective. Robert Cummins, for example, argues that people should not be judged for their individual actions, but rather for how those actions "reflect on their character". If character (however defined) is the dominant causal factor in determining one's choices, and one's choices are morally wrong, then one should be held accountable for those choices, regardless of genes and other such factors.

In law, there is a known exception to the assumption that moral culpability lies in either individual character or freely willed acts. The insanity defense – or its corollary, diminished responsibility (a sort of appeal to the fallacy of the single cause) – can be used to argue that the guilty deed was not the product of a guilty mind. In such cases, the legal systems of most Western societies assume that the person is in some way not at fault, because his actions were a consequence of abnormal brain function (implying brain function is a deterministic causal agent of mind and motive).

==== Argument from luck ====
The argument from luck is a criticism against the libertarian conception of moral responsibility. It suggests that any given action, and even a person's character, is the result of various forces outside a person's control. It may not be appropriate, then, to hold that person solely morally responsible. Thomas Nagel suggests that four different types of luck (including genetic influences and other external factors) end up influencing the way that a person's actions are evaluated morally. For instance, a person driving drunk may make it home without incident, and yet this action of drunk driving might seem more morally objectionable if someone happens to jaywalk along his path (getting hit by the car).

This argument can be traced back to David Hume. If physical indeterminism is true, then those events that are not determined are scientifically described as probabilistic or random. It is therefore argued that it is doubtful that one can praise or blame someone for performing an action generated randomly by his nervous system (without there being any non-physical agency responsible for the observed probabilistic outcome).

=== Hard determinism ===
Hard determinists (not to be confused with fatalists) often use liberty in practical moral considerations, rather than a notion of a free will. Indeed, faced with the possibility that determinism requires a completely different moral system, some proponents say "So much the worse for free will!". Clarence Darrow, the famous defense attorney, pleaded the innocence of his clients, Leopold and Loeb, by invoking such a notion of hard determinism. During his summation, he declared:

What has this boy to do with it? He was not his own father; he was not his own mother; he was not his own grandparents. All of this was handed to him. He did not surround himself with governesses and wealth. He did not make himself. And yet he is to be compelled to pay.

Paul the Apostle, in his Epistle to the Romans addresses the question of moral responsibility as follows: "Hath not the potter power over the clay, of the same lump to make one vessel unto honour, and another unto dishonour?" In this view, individuals can still be dishonoured for their acts even though those acts were ultimately completely determined by God.

Joshua Greene and Jonathan Cohen, researchers in the emerging field of neuroethics, argue, on the basis of such cases, that our current notion of moral responsibility is founded on libertarian (and dualist) intuitions. They argue that cognitive neuroscience research (e.g. neuroscience of free will) is undermining these intuitions by showing that the brain is responsible for our actions, not only in cases of florid psychosis, but also in less obvious situations. For example, damage to the frontal lobe reduces the ability to weigh uncertain risks and make prudent decisions, and therefore leads to an increased likelihood that someone will commit a violent crime. This is true not only of patients with damage to the frontal lobe due to accident or stroke, but also of adolescents, who show reduced frontal lobe activity compared to adults, and even of children who are chronically neglected or mistreated. In each case, the guilty party can, they argue, be said to have less responsibility for his actions. Greene and Cohen predict that, as such examples become more common and well known, jurors' interpretations of free will and moral responsibility will move away from the intuitive libertarian notion that currently underpins them. They also argue that the legal system does not require this libertarian interpretation. Rather, they suggest that only retributive notions of justice, in which the goal of the legal system is to punish people for misdeeds, require the libertarian intuition. Many forms of ethically realistic and consequentialist approaches to justice, which are aimed at promoting future welfare rather than retribution, can survive even a hard determinist interpretation of free will. Accordingly, the legal system and notions of justice can thus be maintained even in the face of emerging neuroscientific evidence undermining libertarian intuitions of free will.

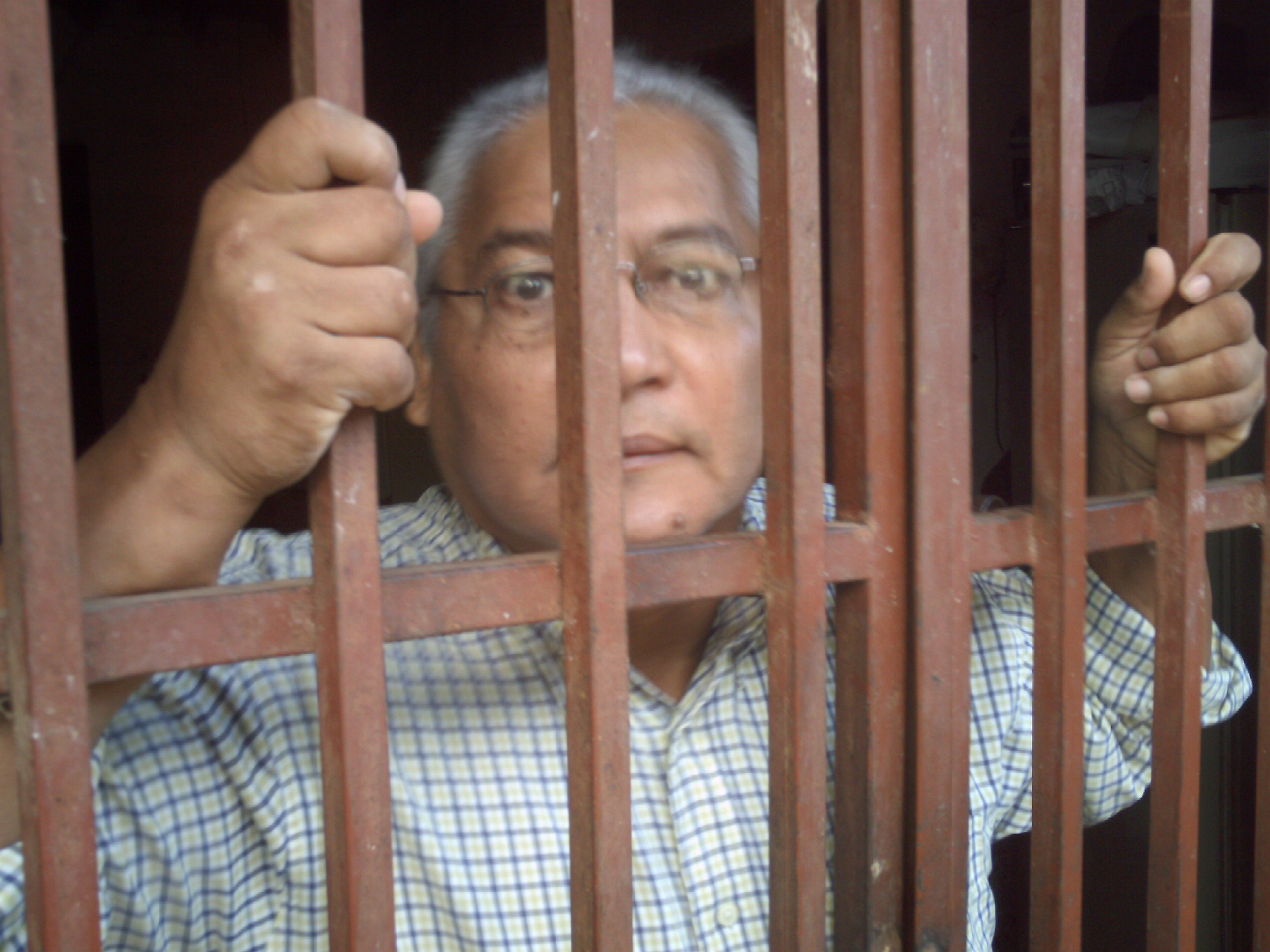
David Eagleman explains that nature and nurture cause all criminal behavior. He likewise believes that science demands that change and improvement, rather than guilt, must become the focus of the legal justice system.

Neuroscientist David Eagleman maintains similar ideas. Eagleman says that the legal justice system ought to become more forward looking. He says it is wrong to ask questions of narrow culpability, rather than focusing on what is important: what needs to change in a criminal's behavior and brain. Eagleman is not saying that no one is responsible for their crimes, but rather that the "sentencing phase" should correspond with modern neuroscientific evidence. To Eagleman, it is damaging to entertain the illusion that a person can make a single decision that is somehow, suddenly, independent of their physiology and history. He describes what scientists have learned from brain damaged patients, and offers the case of a school teacher who exhibited escalating pedophilic tendencies on two occasions – each time as results of growing tumors. Eagleman also warns that less attractive people and minorities tend to get longer sentencing – all of which he sees as symptoms that more science is needed in the legal system.

=== Hard incompatibilism ===
Derk Pereboom defends a skeptical position about free will he calls hard incompatibilism. In his view, we cannot have free will if our actions are causally determined by factors beyond our control, or if our actions are indeterministic events – if they happen by chance. Pereboom conceives of free will as the control in action required for moral responsibility in the sense involving deserved blame and praise, punishment and reward. While he acknowledges that libertarian agent causation, the capacity of agents as substances to cause actions without being causally determined by factors beyond their control, is still a possibility, he regards it as unlikely against the backdrop of the most defensible physical theories. Without libertarian agent causation, Pereboom thinks the free will required for moral responsibility in the desert-involving sense is not in the offing. However, he also contends that by contrast with the backward-looking, desert-involving sense of moral responsibility, forward-looking senses are compatible with causal determination. For instance, causally determined agents who act badly might justifiably be blamed with the aim of forming faulty character, reconciling impaired relationships, and protecting others from harm they are apt to cause.

Pereboom proposes that a viable criminal jurisprudence is compatible with the denial of deserved blame and punishment. His view rules out retributivist justifications for punishment, but it allows for incapacitation of dangerous criminals on the analogy with quarantine of carriers of dangerous diseases. Isolation of carriers of the Ebola virus can be justified on the ground of the right to defend against threat, a justification that does not reference desert. Pereboom contends that the analogy holds for incapacitation of dangerous criminals. He also argues that the less serious the threat, the more moderate the justifiable method of incapacitation; for certain crimes only monitoring may be needed. In addition, just as we should do what we can, within reasonable bounds, to cure the carriers of the Ebola virus we quarantine, so we should aim to rehabilitate and reintegrate the criminals we incapacitate. Pereboom also proposes that given hard incompatibilism, punishment justified as general deterrence may be legitimate when the penalties do not involve undermining an agent's capacity to live a meaningful, flourishing life, since justifying such moderate penalties need not invoke desert.

=== Compatibilism ===
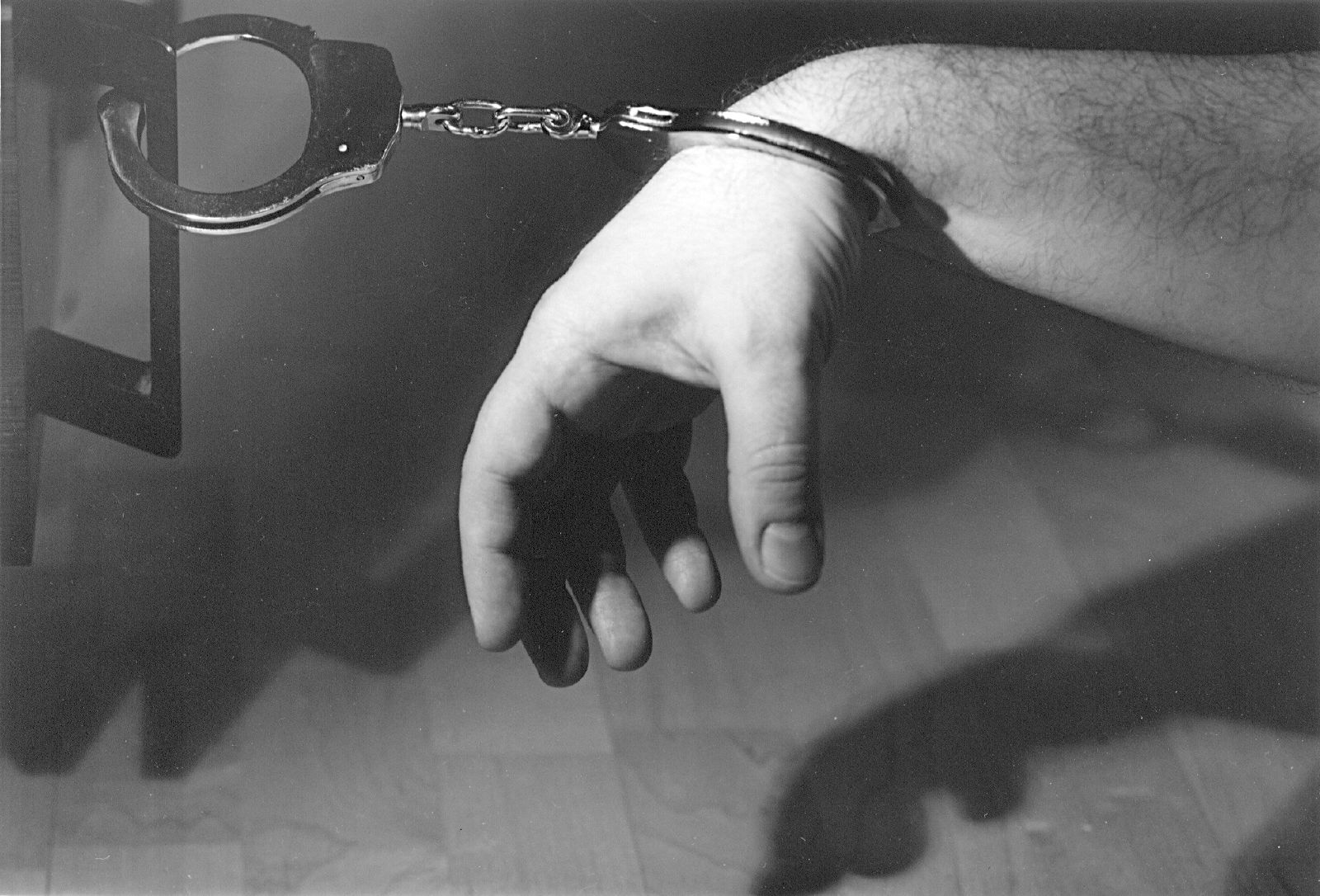
Some forms of compatibilism suggest the term free will should only be used to mean something more like liberty.

Compatibilists contend that even if determinism were true, it would still be possible for us to have free will. The Hindu text The Bhagavad Gita offers one very early compatibilist account. Facing the prospect of going to battle against kinsmen to whom he has bonds, Arjuna despairs. Krishna attempts to assuage Arjuna's anxieties. He argues that forces of nature come together to produce actions, and it is only vanity that causes us to regard ourselves as the agent in charge of these actions. However, Krishna adds this caveat: "... [But] the Man who knows the relation between the forces of Nature and actions, witnesses how some forces of Nature work upon other forces of Nature, and becomes [not] their slave..." When we are ignorant of the relationship between forces of Nature, we become passive victims of nomological facts. Krishna's admonition is intended to get Arjuna to perform his duty (i.e., fight in the battle), but he is also claiming that being a successful moral agent requires being mindful of the wider circumstances in which one finds oneself. Paramahansa Yogananda also said, "Freedom means the power to act by soul guidance, not by the compulsions of desires and habits. Obeying the ego leads to bondage; obeying the soul brings liberation."

In the Western tradition, Baruch Spinoza echoes the Bhagavad Gita's point about agents and natural forces, writing "men think themselves free because they are conscious of their volitions and their appetite, and do not think, even in their dreams, of the causes by which they are disposed to wanting and willing, because they are ignorant [of those causes]." Krishna is hostile to the influence of passions on our rational faculties, speaking up instead for the value of heeding the dictates of one's own nature: "Even a wise man acts under the impulse of his nature. Of what use is restraint?" Spinoza similarly identifies the taming of one's passions as a way to extricate oneself from merely being passive in the face of external forces and a way toward following our own natures.

Jesus asserted that "There is a path that SEEMS right to a man which leads to Destruction". The contrapositive (equivalent) is the origin of this position of Spinoza. "If a man is Not on the road to destruction, then he has not taken the path that ONLY SEEMS right to him."

P.F. Strawson is a major example of a contemporary compatibilist. His paper "Freedom and Resentment," which adduces reactive attitudes, has been widely cited as an important response to incompatibilist accounts of free will. Other compatibilists, who have been inspired by Strawson's paper, are as follows: Gary Watson, Susan Wolf, R. Jay Wallace, Paul Russell, and David Shoemaker.

=== Other views ===
Daniel Dennett asks why anyone would care about whether someone had the property of responsibility and speculates that the idea of moral responsibility may be "a purely metaphysical hankering". In this view, the denial of moral responsibility is the moral hankering to be able to assert that one has some fictitious right such as asserting parental rights instead of parent responsibility.

Bruce Waller has argued, in Against Moral Responsibility (MIT Press), that moral responsibility "belongs with the ghosts and gods and that it cannot survive in a naturalistic environment devoid of miracles". We cannot punish another for wrong acts committed, contends Waller, because the causal forces which precede and have brought about the acts may ultimately be reduced to luck, namely, factors over which the individual has no control. One may not be blamed even for one's character traits, he maintains, since they too are heavily influenced by evolutionary, environmental, and genetic factors (inter alia). Although his view would fall in the same category as the views of philosophers like Dennett who argue against moral responsibility, Waller's view differs in an important manner: He tries to, as he puts it, "rescue" free will from moral responsibility (See Chapter 3). This move goes against the commonly held assumption that how one feels about free will is ipso facto a claim about moral responsibility.

=== Epistemic condition for moral responsibility ===
In philosophical discussions of moral responsibility, two necessary conditions are usually cited: the control (or freedom) condition (which answers the question 'did the individual doing the action in question have free will?') and the epistemic condition, the former of which is explored in the above discussion. The epistemic condition, in contrast to the control condition, focuses on the question 'was the individual aware of, for instance, the moral implications of what she did?' Not all philosophers think this condition to be a distinct condition, separate from the control condition: For instance, Alfred Mele thinks that the epistemic condition is a component of the control condition. Nonetheless, there seems to be a philosophical consensus of sorts that it is both distinct and explanatorily relevant. One major concept associated with the condition is "awareness". According to those philosophers who affirm this condition, one needs to be "aware" of four things to be morally responsible: the action (which one is doing), its moral significance, consequences, and alternatives.

== Experimental research ==
Mauro suggests that a sense of personal responsibility does not operate or evolve universally among humankind. He argues that it was absent in the successful civilization of the Iroquois.

In recent years, research in experimental philosophy has explored whether people's untutored intuitions about determinism and moral responsibility are compatibilist or incompatibilist. Some experimental work has included cross-cultural studies. However, the debate about whether people naturally have compatibilist or incompatibilist intuitions has not come out overwhelmingly in favor of one view or the other, finding evidence for both views. For instance, when people are presented with abstract cases that ask if a person could be morally responsible for an immoral act when they could not have done otherwise, people tend to say no, or give incompatibilist answers. When presented with a specific immoral act that a specific person committed, people tend to say that that person is morally responsible for their actions, even if they were determined (that is, people also give compatibilist answers).

The neuroscience of free will investigates various experiments that might shed light on free will.

One of the attributes defined for psychopathy is "failure to accept responsibility for own actions".

== Collective ==
When people attribute moral responsibility, they usually attribute it to individual moral agents. However, Joel Feinberg, among others, has argued that corporations and other groups of people can have what is called 'collective moral responsibility' for a state of affairs. For example, when South Africa had an apartheid regime, the country's government might have been said to have had collective moral responsibility for the violation of the rights of non-European South Africans.

== Artificial systems ==
The emergence of automation, robotics and related technologies prompted the question, 'Can an artificial system be morally responsible?' The question has a closely related variant, 'When (if ever) does moral responsibility transfer from its human creator(s) to the system?'.

The questions arguably adjoin with but are distinct from machine ethics, which is concerned with the moral behavior of artificial systems. Whether an artificial system's behavior qualifies it to be morally responsible has been a key focus of debate.

Some recent philosophical work proposes that responsibility for outcomes produced by artificial systems can be analyzed into causal and epistemic components and argues that in narrow cases, where an artificial system both causally produces an outcome and could be said to satisfy epistemic conditions, one can coherently ascribe moral responsibility to that system. Public-facing commentaries have stressed that opaque systems and distributed development chains complicate tracing responsibility to particular agents, creating practical accountability gaps even if a philosophical account of system responsibility were available. Survey accounts in moral philosophy emphasize that debates over ascribing moral responsibility to artificial systems hinge on contested issues such as intentionality, consciousness, and the appropriate functions of legal and moral accountability, and that there is no consensus. These debates are closely connected to questions about the appropriate roles of moral and legal responsibility in regulating the design, deployment and consequences of AI and robotic systems.

=== Arguments that artificial systems cannot be morally responsible ===
Batya Friedman and Peter Kahn Jr. posited that intentionality is a necessary condition for moral responsibility, and that computer systems as conceivable in 1992 in material and structure could not have intentionality.

Arthur Kuflik asserted in 1999 that humans must bear the ultimate moral responsibility for a computer's decisions, as it is humans who design the computers and write their programs. He further proposed that humans can never relinquish oversight of computers.

Frances Grodzinsky et al. considered artificial systems that could be modelled as finite-state machines. They posited in 2008 that if the machine had a fixed state-transition table, then it could not be morally responsible. If the machine could modify its table, then the machine's designer still retained some moral responsibility.

Patrick Hew argued that for an artificial system to be morally responsible, its rules for behaviour and the mechanisms for supplying those rules must not be supplied entirely by external humans. He further argued that such systems are a substantial departure from technologies and theory as extant in 2014. An artificial system based on those technologies will carry zero responsibility for its behaviour. Moral responsibility is apportioned to the humans that created and programmed the system.

=== Arguments that artificial systems can be morally responsible ===
Colin Allen et al. proposed that an artificial system may be morally responsible if its behaviours are functionally indistinguishable from a moral person, coining the idea of a 'Moral Turing Test'. They subsequently disavowed the Moral Turing Test in recognition of controversies surrounding the Turing Test.

Andreas Matthias described a 'responsibility gap' where to hold humans responsible for a machine would be an injustice, but to hold the machine responsible would challenge 'traditional' ways of ascription. He proposed in 2004 three cases where the machine's behaviour ought to be attributed to the machine and not its designers or operators. First, he argued that modern machines are inherently unpredictable (to some degree), but perform tasks that need to be performed yet cannot be handled by simpler means. Second, that there are increasing 'layers of obscurity' between manufacturers and system, as hand coded programs are replaced with more sophisticated means. Third, in systems that have rules of operation that can be changed during the operation of the machine.

A more extensive review of the arguments may be found in Patrick Hew's 2014 article on artificial moral agents.

== See also ==
- Ability – Power to perform an action
- Accountability – Concept of responsibility in ethics, governance and decision-making
- Animal ethics – Moral status and treatment of nonhuman animals
- Declaration of Human Duties and Responsibilities – 1998 UNESCO declaration
- House of Responsibility – Former project concept
- Incompatibilism – Contradiction of free will and determinism
- Legal liability – Legal obligation for any damage, enforceable by either civil law or criminal law
- Moral agency – Ability to make ethical judgements
- Moral hazard – Increases in the exposure to risk when insured, or when another bears the cost
