= Christopher Hookway =

British philosopher

Philosophical work
- Era: 21st-century philosophy
- Region: Western philosophy
- Institutions: University of Sheffield, University of Birmingham
- Doctoral students: Keith Frankish
- Main interests: Pragmatism

Christopher Hookway (1949–2024) was a British philosopher. He taught at the University of Birmingham from 1977 until 1995 and was subsequently Professor in Philosophy at the University of Sheffield.

He was known for his studies of Charles S. Peirce and was a former president of the Aristotelian Society.

== Books ==
- The Pragmatic Maxim: Essays on Peirce and Pragmatism. Oxford University Press 2012
- Truth, Rationality, and Pragmatism. Oxford University Press 2003
- Peirce. Taylor & Francis 1999
- Skepticism. Routledge 1990
- Quine. Polity Press 1988
