= Saul Smilansky =

Israeli philosopher

- שאול סמילנסקי
- Born: 1961 (age 64–65)

Philosophical work
- Era: 21st-century philosophy
- Region: Western philosophy
- School: Analytic
- Institutions: University of Haifa
- Main interests: Ethics, Free Will, Meaning of Life
- Notable ideas: Free Will Illusionism, Paradoxical Ethics
- Website: https://www.saulsmilansky.com/

Saul Smilansky (Hebrew: שאול סמילנסקי; born 1961) is an Israeli philosopher and a Professor at the Department of Philosophy of the University of Haifa. He is known for his works on free will and normative and applied ethics.

In normative and applied ethics, Smilansky has written extensively on moral paradoxes and related issues in what he terms "paradoxical ethics," where propositions may appear both plausible and absurd. His work addresses moral theory, justice, the role of self-deception and illusion in human life, population ethics, punishment, moral complaint and hypocrisy, gratitude, and contribution.

In the free will debate, Smilansky has developed two major lines of argument. First, he has defended a pluralistic approach to the compatibility question, which acknowledges both compatibilism and hard determinism (or other forms of free will skepticism) as partially valid, and seeks to integrate them. Second, he has advanced the position of Illusionism, according to which illusion plays a central and in many respects positive role in the free will problem.

Smilansky is the author of Free Will and Illusion (Oxford University Press, 2000), 10 Moral Paradoxes (Blackwell, 2007), which has been translated into seven languages, and Paradoxical Ethics (Oxford University Press, 2026). He has also published more than one hundred papers in leading philosophical journals and edited collections.

Smilansky received his B.A. in philosophy from Tel Aviv University (1986) and his D.Phil. from Oxford University (Magdalen College) (1990).

== Books ==
- Paradoxical Ethics, Oxford University Press. 2026.
- 10 Moral Paradoxes, Wiley-Blackwell. 2007.
- Free Will and Illusion, Oxford University Press. 2000.

== Selected articles (Partial List) ==
- Smilansky, Saul. “The Ethical Advantages of Hard Determinism.” Philosophy and Phenomenological Research 54, no. 2 (1994): 355–363.
- Smilansky, Saul. “Is There a Moral Obligation to Have Children?” Journal of Applied Philosophy 12, no. 1 (1995): 41–53.
- Smilansky, Saul. “Free Will.” Proceedings of the Twentieth World Congress of Philosophy 2 (1999): 143–152. Bowling Green, OH: Philosophy Documentation Center.
- Smilansky, Saul. “Free Will, Fundamental Dualism, and the Centrality of Illusion.” In The Oxford Handbook of Free Will, edited by Robert Kane, 489–505. New York: Oxford University Press, 2002.
- Smilansky, Saul. “Can Deontologists Be Moderate?” Utilitas 15, no. 1:71 (2003): 9–29.
- Smilansky, Saul. “Hard Determinism and Punishment: A Practical 'Reductio'.” Law and Philosophy 30, no. 3 (2011): 353–367.
- Smilansky, Saul. “Morally, Should We Prefer Never to Have Existed?” Australasian Journal of Philosophy 91, no. 4 (2013): 655–666. DOI:10.1007/s10790-013-9389-0.
- Smilansky, Saul. “A Hostage Situation.” Journal of Philosophy 116, no. 8 (2019): 447–466.
- Smilansky, Saul. “Free Will Denial and Deontological Constraints.” In Free Will Skepticism in Law and Society, edited by Elizabeth Shaw, Derk Pereboom, and Gregg D. Caruso, 79–96. Cambridge: Cambridge University Press, 2019.
- Smilansky, Saul; Juha Räikkä. “Black Magic and Respecting Persons — Some Perplexities.” Ratio 33, no. 2 (2020): 173–183.
- Smilansky, Saul. “Should We Sacrifice the Utilitarians First?” Philosophical Quarterly 70, no. 281 (2020): 850–867.
- Smilansky, Saul. “The Moral Evaluation of Past Tragedies: A New Puzzle.” Journal of Moral Philosophy 17, no. 2 (2020): 188–201.
- Smilansky, Saul. “We Are All in This Life Together.” Iyyun 68 (2020): 85–93.
- Smilansky, Saul. “A Puzzle About Self-Sacrificing Altruism.” Journal of Controversial Ideas 1, no. 1 (2021): Article 7. DOI:10.35995/jci01010007.
- Smilansky, Saul. “Contribution, Replaceability and the Meaning of Our Lives.” Theoria 87, no. 2 (2021): 193–213. DOI:10.1111/theo.12352.
- Smilansky, Saul. “Do You Have to Reply to This Paper?” Philosophia 49, no. 5 (2021): 1361–1368.
- Smilansky, Saul. “Overpunishment and the Punishment of the Innocent.” Analytic Philosophy 62, no. 4 (2021): 463–475. DOI:10.1111/phib.12206.
- Smilansky, Saul. “The Idea of Moral Duties to History.” Philosophy 96, no. 1 (2021): 155–179.
- Smilansky, Saul. “Three Kinds of Failure.” Iyyun 69 (2021): 299–313.
- Smilansky, Saul. “Two Concepts of Effort.” Philosophia 50, no. 5 (2022): 2663–2673. DOI:10.1007/s11406-022-00494-z.
- Smilansky, Saul. “The Moral Duty Not to Confirm Negative Stereotypes.” Journal of Moral Philosophy 21, no. 3–4 (2023): 379–403. DOI:10.1163/17455243-20234065.
- Smilansky, Saul. “Free Will Denialism as a Dangerous Gamble.” Diametros 21, no. 79 (2024): 119–131. DOI:10.33392/diam.1943.
