= Incompatibilism =

Contradiction of free will and determinism

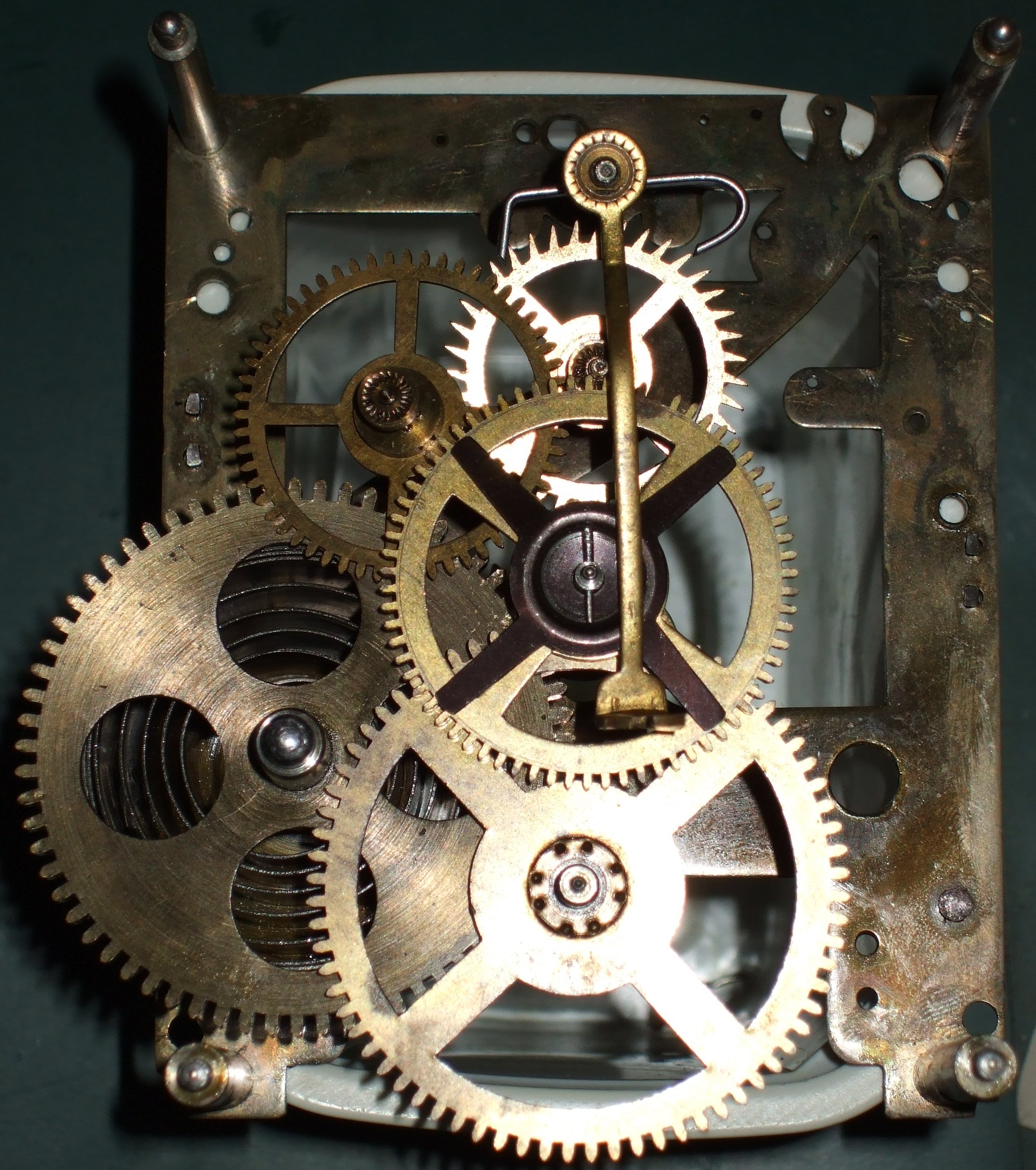
Classical incompatibilists hold that determinism leaves no room for free will.

Incompatibilism is the view that the thesis of determinism is logically incompatible with the classical thesis of free will. The term was coined in the 1960s, most likely by philosopher Keith Lehrer. The term compatibilism was coined (also by Lehrer) to name the view that the classical free will thesis is logically compatible with determinism, i.e. it is possible for an ordinary human to exercise free will (the freedom-relevant ability to do otherwise), even in a universe where determinism is true.

These terms were originally coined for use within a research paradigm that was dominant among academics during the so-called "classical period" from the 1960s to 1980s, or what has been called the "classical analytic paradigm". Within the classical analytic paradigm, the problem of free will and determinism was understood as a compatibility question: "Is it possible for an ordinary human to exercise free will (classically defined as an ability to do otherwise) when determinism is true?" Those working in the classical analytic paradigm who answered "no" were incompatibilists in the original, classical-analytic sense of the term, now commonly called classical incompatibilists; they proposed that determinism precludes free will because it precludes the ability to do otherwise. Those who answered "yes" were compatibilists in the original sense of the term, now commonly called classical compatibilists. Given that classical free will theorists (i.e. those working in the classical analytic paradigm) agreed that it is at least metaphysically possible for an ordinary human to exercise free will, all classical compatibilists accepted a compossibilist account of free will (i.e. a compossibilist interpretation of the ability to do otherwise) and all classical incompatibilists accepted a libertarian account of free will (i.e. a libertarian interpretation of the ability to do otherwise).

The classical analytic paradigm has fallen out of favor over the last few decades, largely because philosophers no longer agree that free will is equivalent to some kind of ability to do otherwise; many hold that it is, instead, a type of sourcehood that does not require an ability to do otherwise. The number of philosophers who reject the classical assumption of anthropocentric possibilism, i.e. the view that it is at least metaphysically possible for a human to exercise free will, has also risen in recent years. As philosophers adjusted Lehrer's original (classical) definitions of the terms incompatibilism and compatibilism to reflect their own perspectives on the location of the purported "fundamental divide" among free will theorists, the terms incompatibilism and compatibilism have been given a variety of new meanings. At present, then, there is no standard meaning of the term incompatibilism (or its complement compatibilism).

== Definition ==
On one recent taxonomy, there are now at least three substantively different, non-classical uses of the term incompatibilism, namely: neo-classical incompatibilism, post-classical incompatibilism (a.k.a. incompossibilism), and anti-classical incompatibilism. Correspondingly, there are neo-classical, post-classical (compossibilist), and anti-classical versions of compatibilism as well. Neo-classical incompatibilism is a two-tenet view: incompossibilism is true (i.e. it is metaphysically impossible for an ordinary human to act freely when determinism is true), and determinism-related causal/nomological factors preclude free will (which explains why incompossibilism is true). Correspondingly, neo-classical compatibilism is the two-tenet view that: the negative, non-explanatory tenet of neo-classical incompatibilism is false (i.e. compossibilism is true), and that the positive, explanatory tenet of neo-classical incompatibilism is false. Anti-classical incompatibilism is the explanatory thesis of neo-classical incompatibilism; anti-classical incompatibilism is neutral on the truth-value of incompossibilism. Correspondingly, anti-classical compatibilism is the negation of neo-classical incompatibilism's positive tenet, i.e. anti-classical compatibilism is the contradictory of anti-classical incompatibilism. Post-classical incompatibilism is just the negative, non-explanatory thesis of neo-classical incompatibilism; this view is neutral on whether the positive, explanatory thesis of neo-classical incompatibilism is true. (Put another way, on the post-classical redefinition of incompatibilism, it is just an alternative name for incompossibilism, a view which is completely silent on whether determinism-related causal factors are relevant to free will or are a total "red herring" in discussions of free will.) Correspondingly, post-classical compatibilism is identical to compossibilism (i.e. on the post-classical redefinition of compatibilism, it denotes mere compossibilism).

The ambiguity of incompatibilism can be a source of confusion because arguments with very different (even inconsistent) conclusions are currently lumped together under the umbrella phrase "arguments for incompatibilism". For example, it is easy for the casual reader to overlook that some arguments for post-classical incompatibilism (a.k.a. incompossibilism) are not arguments for neo-classical incompatibilism on the grounds that the argument does not aim to support the latter's explanatory tenet (a.k.a. anti-classical incompatibilism). Other arguments support post-classical incompatibilism (a.k.a. incompossibilism) but conclude that neo-classical incompatibilism is false on the grounds that its explanatory tenet (a.k.a. anti-classical incompatibilism) is false. Arguments in the last category conclude that people lack free will when determinism is true but not at all because determinism is true (i.e. not at all because certain causal/nomological factors obtain); most propose that the real threat to free will is that people lack adequate control over their own constitutive properties, or what is often called their "constitutive luck" (as opposed to causal luck).

== Libertarianism ==
Free-will libertarianism is the view that the free-will thesis (that we, ordinary humans, have free will) is true and that determinism is false; in first-order language, it is the view that we (ordinary humans) have free will and the world does not behave in the way described by determinism. Libertarianism is one of the popular solutions to the problem of free will, roughly the problem of settling the question of whether we have free will and the logically prior question of what free will amounts to. The main rivals to libertarianism are soft determinism and hard determinism.

Libertarian Robert Kane (editor of the Oxford Handbook of Free Will) is a leading incompatibilist philosopher in favour of free will. Kane seeks to hold persons morally responsible for decisions that involved indeterminism in their process. Critics maintain that Kane fails to overcome the greatest challenge to such an endeavor: "the argument from luck". Namely, if a critical moral choice is a matter of luck (indeterminate quantum fluctuations), then the question of holding a person responsible for their final action arises. Moreover, even if we imagine that a person can make an act of will ahead of time, to make the moral action more probable in the upcoming critical moment, this act of 'willing' was itself a matter of luck. Kane objects to the validity of the argument from luck because the latter misrepresents the chance as if it is external to the act of choosing. The free will theorem of John H. Conway and Simon B. Kochen further establishes that if we have free will, then quantum particles also possess free will. This means that starting from the assumption that humans have free will, it is possible to pinpoint the origin of their free will in the quantum particles that constitute their brain.

Such philosophical stance risks an infinite regress, however; if any such mind is real, an objection can be raised that free will would be impossible if the choosing is shaped merely by luck or chance.

Libertarianism in the philosophy of mind is unrelated to the like-named political philosophy. It suggests that we actually do have free will, that it is incompatible with determinism, and that therefore the future is not determined.

One famous proponent of this view was Lucretius, who asserted that the free will arises out of the random, chaotic movements of atoms, called "clinamen". One major objection to this view is that science has gradually shown that more and more of the physical world obeys completely deterministic laws, and seems to suggest that our minds are just as much part of the physical world as anything else. If these assumptions are correct, incompatibilist libertarianism can only be maintained as the claim that free will is a supernatural phenomenon, which does not obey the laws of nature (as, for instance, maintained by some religious traditions).

However, many libertarian view points now rely upon an indeterministic view of the physical universe, under the assumption that the idea of a deterministic, clockwork universe has become outdated since the advent of quantum mechanics. By assuming an indeterministic universe, libertarian philosophical constructs can be proposed under the assumption of physicalism.

There are libertarian view points based upon indeterminism and physicalism, which is closely related to naturalism. A major problem for naturalistic libertarianism is to explain how indeterminism can be compatible with rationality and with appropriate connections between an individual's beliefs, desires, general character and actions. A variety of naturalistic libertarianism is promoted by Robert Kane, who emphasizes that if our character is formed indeterministically (in "self-forming actions"), then our actions can still flow from our character, and yet still be incompatibilistically free.

Alternatively, libertarian view points based upon indeterminism have been proposed without the assumption of naturalism. At the time C. S. Lewis wrote Miracles, quantum mechanics (and physical indeterminism) was only in the initial stages of acceptance, but still Lewis stated the logical possibility that, if the physical world was proved to be indeterministic, this would provide an entry (interaction) point into the traditionally viewed closed system, where a scientifically described physically probable/improbable event could be philosophically described as an action of a non-physical entity on physical reality (noting that, under a physicalist point of view, the non-physical entity must be independent of the self-identity or mental processing of the sentient being). Lewis mentions this only in passing, making clear that his thesis does not depend on it in any way.

Others may use some form of Donald Davidson's anomalous monism to suggest that although the mind is in fact part of the physical world, it involves a different level of description of the same facts, so that although there are deterministic laws under the physical description, there are no such laws under the mental description, and thus our actions are free and not determined.

=== Consequence argument ===
Peter van Inwagen proposed his consequence argument to argue that free will is not compatible with determinism. He assumes the truth of determinism to argue that a person could not have acted differently from how they actually did. from this, he rejects that determinism is true to preserve free will, but concludes that they are mutually exclusive. His argument is formally valid as follows:

(1) If determinism is true, then the conjunction of P0 and L entail P (2) It is not possible that J have raised his hands at T and P be true (3) If (2) is true, then if J could have raised his hand at T, J could have rendered P false (4) If J could have rendered P false, and if the conjunction of P0 and L entails P, then J could have rendered the conjunction of P0 and L false (5) If J could have rendered the conjunction of P0 and L false, then J could have rendered L false (6) J could not have rendered L false (7) If determinism is true, J could not have raised his hand at T

Where J is a judge who did not raise their hand at time T, P is the entire physical state of the world at T, P0 is the entire physical state of the world in the remote past, and L is the conjunction of all the laws of nature, which by definition cannot actually be rendered false.

Van Inwagen then presents a dilemma, we can either:

- Deny determinism and accept incompatibilism
- Accept that contradictions could be true in the actual world
- Accept that we can change the remote past
- Accept that we can render false the laws of nature
- Deny Free will and accept incompatibilism

The compatibilist is committed to rejecting the former and the latter, so they choose option 2, 3, or 4 to maintain their position. David Lewis objected by denying that laws of nature are never violated with counterpart theory, although counterpart theory is very controversial, and this leaves us with a significantly diluted version of free will.

Kadri Vihvelin rejected the argument by dismissing the conclusion, but refused to choose a premise to deny, arguing that the conclusion is false; therefore, one of the premises must be too. She later accepted Lewis's position, which is known as "local miracle compatibilism."

=== Semicompatibilism ===
Semicompatibilism is unaffected by the consequent argument, as it is indifferent as to whether or not free will is compatible with determinism. It had previously been assumed that free will is required for moral responsibility, meaning that if determinism threatened free will, it would threaten moral responsibility as well. Semi-compatibilists deny this entailment, arguing that, regardless of free will's compatibility, moral responsibility is compatible with determinism. However, Van Inwagen's Direct Argument argues in a similar manner for the incompatibility of determinism with moral responsibility. A semicompatibilist would have to engage with this argument, although its validity is questioned over modal logic.

== Hard determinism ==
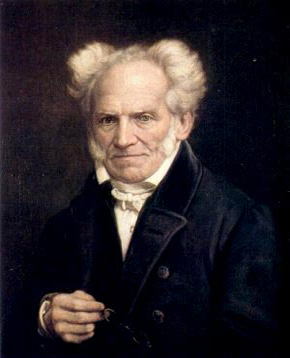
Schopenhauer said "Man is free to do what he wills, but he cannot will what he wills." The hard determinist says then, there is no "free will".

Those who reject free will and accept determinism are variously known as "hard determinists", hard incompatibilists, free will skeptics, free will illusionists, or impossibilists. They believe that there is no free will and that any sense of the contrary is an illusion. Hard determinists do not deny that one has desires, but say that these desires are causally determined by an unbroken chain of prior occurrences. According to this philosophy, no wholly random, spontaneous, mysterious, or miraculous events occur. Determinists sometimes assert that it is stubborn to resist scientifically motivated determinism on purely intuitive grounds about one's own sense of freedom. They reason that the history of the development of science suggests that determinism is the logical method in which reality works.

William James said that philosophers (and scientists) have an "antipathy to chance". Absolute chance, a possible implication of quantum mechanics and the indeterminacy principle, supports the existence of indefinite causal structures.

=== Moral implications ===
Since many believe that free will is necessary for moral responsibility, hard determinism may imply disastrous consequences for their theory of ethics, resulting in a domino theory of moral nonresponsibility.

As something of a solution to this predicament, one might embrace the so-called illusion of free will. This thesis argues in favor of maintaining the prevailing belief in free will for the sake of preserving moral responsibility and the concept of ethics. However, critics argue that this move renders morality merely another "illusion", or else that this move is simply hypocritical.

The determinist will add that, even if denying free will does mean morality is incoherent, such a result has no effect on the truth. However, hard determinists often have some sort of moral system that relies explicitly on determinism. A determinist's moral system simply bears in mind that every person's actions in a given situation are, in theory, predicted by the interplay of environment and upbringing.

== Hard incompatibilism ==
Hard incompatibilism, like hard determinism, is a type of skepticism about free will. Hard incompatibilism is a term coined by Derk Pereboom to designate the view that both determinism and indeterminism are incompatible with having free will and moral responsibility. Like the hard determinist, the hard incompatibilist holds that if determinism were true, people would not have free will. But Pereboom argues in addition that if decisions were indeterministic events, free will would also be precluded. In his view, free will is the control in action required for the desert aspect of moral responsibility—for people to deserve to be blamed or punished for immoral actions, and to be praised or rewarded for morally exemplary actions. He contends that if people's decisions were indeterministic events, their occurrence would not be in the control of the agent in the way required for such attributions of desert. The possibility for free will that remains is libertarian agent causation, according to which agents as substances (thus not merely as having a role in events) can cause actions without being causally determined to do so. Pereboom argues that for empirical reasons it is unlikely that people are agent causes of this sort, and that as a result, it is likely that they lack free will.

== Experimental research ==
In recent years researchers in the field of experimental philosophy have been working on determining whether ordinary people, who are not experts in this field, naturally have compatibilist or incompatibilist intuitions about determinism and moral responsibility. Some experimental work has even conducted cross-cultural studies. The debate about whether people naturally have compatibilist or incompatibilist intuitions has not come out overwhelmingly in favor of one view or the other. Still, there has been some evidence that people can naturally hold both views. For instance, when people are presented with abstract cases which ask if a person could be morally responsible for an immoral act when they could not have done otherwise, people tend to say no, or give incompatibilist answers, but when presented with a specific immoral act that a specific person committed, people tend to say that that person is morally responsible for their actions, even if they were determined (that is, people also give compatibilist answers).

== See also ==
- Ability
- Daniel Dennett
  - Freedom Evolves
  - Elbow Room
- Frankfurt cases
- Indeterminism
- Lucretius' On the Nature of Things
- Molinism
- Philosophical zombie
- Tychism
