= Georges Rey =

American philosopher (born 1945)

Georges Leon Rey (born 1945) is an American philosopher. He is a professor of philosophy at the University of Maryland.

== Biography ==
Rey received a doctoral degree in philosophy from Harvard University in 1978. His thesis was titled The possibility of psychology: some preliminary issues, and was completed under Hilary Putnam.

His book Contemporary Philosophy of Mind discusses the topic of philosophy of mind. One major focus of Rey's exposition relates to eliminativism and instrumentalism, particularly with respect to the mental states that we are subjectively aware of by way of introspection. Rey is the author of the current article on philosophy of mind at Encyclopædia Britannica Online.

== Books ==
- Rey, Georges (1997). Contemporary Philosophy of Mind: A Contentiously Classical Approach. Wiley. ISBN 978-0-631-19071-4.
- Rey, Georges (2020). Representation of Language: Philosophical Issues in a Chomskyan Linguistics. Oxford University Press. ISBN 978-0-19-885563-7.
