= Evolutionary debunking =

Philosophical argument against moral realism

An evolutionary debunking, sometimes referred to as an evolutionary debunking argument or evolutionary debunking thesis, is a philosophical argument which holds that, because humans (like all organisms) have an evolutionary origin, the principles of ethics and morality that we have devised are invalid and cannot be considered objective knowledge. Proponents of such arguments argue that they refute, or at least cast doubt on, moral realism and/or theism. However, critics have argued that these arguments are themselves invalid.
