= Eric Schwitzgebel =

American philosopher and professor

- Organization: University of California, Riverside

Education
- Education: University of California, Berkeley (PhD)
- Thesis: Words About Young Minds: The Concepts of Theory, Representation, and Belief in Philosophy and Developmental Psychology (1997)
- Website: faculty.ucr.edu/~eschwitz/

Eric Schwitzgebel is an American professor of philosophy at the University of California, Riverside. His main interests include connections between empirical psychology, philosophy of mind, and the nature of belief, as well as Classical Chinese philosophy. He received his PhD from the University of California, Berkeley, under the supervision of Elisabeth A. Lloyd, Alison Gopnik, and John Searle. He has run the online blog The Splintered Mind since 2006.

== Philosophy ==
Schwitzgebel has written four books and many articles on a wide variety of philosophical and psychological topics.

=== Empirical analysis of ethicists ===
Schwitzgebel has studied the behavior of philosophers, particularly ethicists, using empirical methods. Articles he has published investigate whether ethicists behave more ethically than non-philosophers. In a 2009 study, Schwitzgebel investigated the rate at which ethics books were missing from academic libraries compared to similar philosophy books. The study found that ethics books were in fact missing at higher rates than comparable texts in other disciplines.

Subsequent research has measured the behavior of ethicists at conferences, the perceptions of other philosophers about ethicists, and the self-reported behavior of ethicists. Schwitzgebel's research did not find that the ethical behavior of ethicists differed from the behavior of professors in other disciplines. In addition, his research found that the moral beliefs of professional philosophers were just as susceptible to influence by irrelevant factors as those of non-philosophers. Schwitzgebel concluded that "Professional ethicists appear to behave no differently than do non-ethicists of similar social background."

=== Dispositionalist theory of belief ===
Schwitzgebel has defended a highly unorthodox "dispositionalist" account of belief, contrary to the usual "representationalist" theory that sees belief as a mental representation. According to Schwitzgebel, beliefs should be understood as series of cognitive, behavioral, and conscious tendencies. To substantiate this, he proposes a variety of thought experiments and counterexamples to demonstrate the inadequacy of the traditional view.

=== Knowledge about conscious experience ===
Schwitzgebel has argued, primarily in his 2011 book, Perplexities of Consciousness, that much of our conscious experience is actually not known or intelligible to us, challenging common perspectives.

In 2014, he published the paper "If Materialism Is True, the United States Is Probably Conscious", which argues that since, according to materialism, consciousness is not limited to brains in biological bodies, the United States might be conscious in virtue of its ability to collect and process information and act upon it through its citizens and governmental agencies, a form of collective consciousness.

== Books ==
- Hurlbut, Russell; Schwitzgebel, Eric (2007). Describing Inner Experience? Proponent Meets Skeptic. MIT Press. ISBN 978-0-262-08366-9.
- Schwitzgebel, Eric (2011). Perplexities of Consciousness. MIT Press. ISBN 978-0-262-01490-8.
- ——— (2019). A Theory of Jerks and Other Philosophical Misadventures. MIT Press. ISBN 978-0-262-04309-0.
- ——— (2024). The Weirdness of the World. Princeton University Press. ISBN 978-0-691-21567-9.
