= Jesse Prinz =

American philosopher

- Employer(s): CUNY Graduate Center; University of North Carolina at Chapel Hill; Washington University in St. Louis

Education
- Education: University of Chicago

Philosophical work
- Era: Contemporary philosophy
- Region: Western philosophy
- School: Analytic philosophy
- Main interests: Philosophy of mind; moral psychology; ethics

Jesse J. Prinz is an American philosopher who is Distinguished Professor of Philosophy and director of the Committee for Interdisciplinary Science Studies at the CUNY Graduate Center.

Prinz works primarily in the philosophy of psychology and ethics and has authored several books and over 100 articles, addressing such topics as concepts, emotions, moral psychology, attention, consciousness, and aesthetics. Much of his work in these areas has been a defense of empiricism against psychological nativism, and he situates his work in the naturalistic tradition of philosophy associated with David Hume. Prinz is also an advocate of experimental philosophy.

== Education and career ==
Prinz took his PhD at the University of Chicago under the direction of Murat Aydede, a philosopher of cognitive science. He taught previously at the University of North Carolina at Chapel Hill and at Washington University in St. Louis, with visiting positions at University College London, California Institute of Technology, and University of Maryland, College Park.

== Philosophical work ==
=== Theory of concepts ===
Prinz has offered a renewed version of British Empiricists' (Locke and Hume) theories of concepts which treats concepts - not exclusively but mainly - as prototypes.

=== Philosophy of emotions ===
Jesse Prinz has offered a "natural kinds" theory of emotions. According to him, an emotional experience is a bodily change that indicates situations in our environment that should concern us. When we encounter a stimulus that affects our well-being we experience a set of bodily changes that represent things like dangers, losses, and offenses. These bodily changes are appropriate to the situation and are learned over time through association to specific instances we have encountered in the past. They are felt, but oftentimes these feelings are not in the foreground of phenomenal consciousness. When we do pay attention to the feeling it then becomes an actual emotion.

The set of possible feelings are limited by our biology and correspond roughly to our traditional emotional categories. The traditional emotions (anger, fear, etc.) have functional roles and are always related to objects and situations in the environment. They are always directed toward something (i.e. intentional), and these emotions have a particular bodily configuration that defines them. According to Prinz, there are six basic emotions, which are characterized by unique body patterns. The ‘big six’ emotions are actually subdivided into a biologically basic primitive stock of feelings that each culture classifies in different ways. For example, fear could be subdivided into worry (future dangers) and panic (present dangers), both of which spring the experiencing organism into action as an appropriate response to environmental stimulus. Likewise, happiness subdivides into sensory pleasure, satisfaction, and joy which each have specific bodily responses. Complex emotions such as despair, romantic love, and jealousy are recent (on an evolutionary timescale) additions to the breadth of possible affects that are also associations between our primitive stock of feelings and particular kinds of situations. Other homeostatic emotions such as hunger and fatigue are different in that they are states of the organism rather than relationships between it and its environment.

According to this theory, when we encounter certain stimuli we experience a learned bodily change in response. These bodily-change stimuli, or elicitors, belong to what Prinz calls a mental file that is connected to one of our primitive stock of emotions through learning. These “elicitation files” can then trigger the relevant response previously associated with it. Throughout our lives new files can be created and new triggering conditions can be added to existing files. Similar files can become so closely related that triggers for one can also cause the other. However, these elicitation files should not be confused with the emotions themselves, but rather they are culturally calibrated triggers for our emotions. According to Prinz, affects are exhausted by the somatic feelings that are experienced. Emotions are only the feelings and not the causes or effects of those feelings. Each feeling is associated with a range of conditions and represents a response to the current situation being experienced.

=== Ethics and moral psychology ===
Prinz also defends sentimentalism in ethics, and ethical relativism.

== Books ==
- Furnishing the Mind: Concepts and Their Perceptual Basis (MIT: 2002)
- Gut Reactions: A Perceptual Theory of Emotion (OUP: 2004)
- The Emotional Construction of Morals (OUP: 2007)
- Beyond Human Nature (Penguin/Norton: 2012)
- The Conscious Brain (OUP: 2012)

=== Edited books ===
- The Handbook of Philosophy of Psychology. Oxford: Oxford University Press (forthcoming).
- Mind and Cognition, 3rd Edition (with William Lycan). Oxford: Blackwell (Blackwell: 2008)
- Section on 'Philosophy of Mind'. St. Cahn (ed.) Philosophy for the 21st Century. (OUP: 2002).
