= Derk Pereboom =

American philosopher (born 1957)

- Born: February 6, 1957 (age 69); Pesse, Netherlands

Academic background
- Education: Calvin College; University of California, Los Angeles
- Thesis: Kant on Concept and Intuition (1985)
- Doctoral advisor: Robert Merrihew Adams

Academic work
- Discipline: Philosophy
- Institutions: University of Vermont; Cornell University
- Main interests: Philosophy of action; free will; philosophy of mind
- Notable ideas: Hard incompatibilism; nonreductive physicalism

Derk Pereboom (born 1957) is a Dutch-born American philosopher who is the Susan Linn Sage Professor in Philosophy and Ethics at Cornell University. He specializes in free will and moral responsibility, philosophy of mind, philosophy of religion, and the work of Immanuel Kant.

== Life and career ==
Derk Pereboom was born in the village of Pesse, near Hoogeveen, the Netherlands, on February 6, 1957. He received his BA in philosophy at Calvin College in Grand Rapids, Michigan, in 1978, where his teachers included Alvin Plantinga and Nicholas Wolterstorff. He earned his PhD at University of California, Los Angeles in 1985, with a dissertation on Immanuel Kant's theory of mental representation under the supervision of Robert Merrihew Adams and Tyler Burge.

He was an assistant professor in the Department of Philosophy at the University of Vermont from 1985 to 1991, associate professor from 1991 to 1997, and professor from 1997 to 2007. Since 2007, he has been professor in the Sage School of Philosophy at Cornell University.

As of 2018, he is the subject co-editor on topics in the philosophy of action for the Stanford Encyclopedia of Philosophy, and he has also written for the encyclopedia.

== Philosophical work ==
=== Free will ===
Pereboom's position in the free will debate is known as hard incompatibilism. He maintains that due to general facts about the nature of the universe, we can conclude that we lack the metaphysical free will required for the aspect of deep moral responsibility at issue in the traditional debate. That is, whether our actions are deterministically or indeterministically caused, we will not have the control in action required for our deserving to be blamed or punished for immoral decisions, and to be praised or rewarded for those that are morally exemplary or praiseworthy. Pereboom nevertheless proposes that forward-looking aspects of blaming and praising, those that aim, for instance, at improving character and reconciliation in relationships, remain valuable and are still compatible with our lacking free will. He also contends that denying free will is likely to diminish anger and the desire to punish, and in this way can potentially benefit human relationships, both personal and societal. In this respect his position is inspired by the view of Baruch Spinoza, who argues in his Ethics that denying free will would enhance the quality of human life by promoting compassion and forgiveness and letting go of remorse and regret.

=== Philosophy of mind ===
The physicalist position Pereboom proposes in philosophy of mind develops two responses to the hard problem of consciousness, which is explicated by Frank Cameron Jackson's knowledge argument and David Chalmers' conceivability argument against physicalism. The first response invokes the possibility that introspective representations fail to represent mental properties as they are in themselves; specifically, that introspection represents phenomenally conscious properties as having certain characteristic qualitative natures which these properties actually lack. This position is related to the more general illusionism about consciousness advanced by Daniel Dennett and to an illusionist view set out by neuroscientist Michael Graziano. The second response draws on the Russellian monist proposal that currently unknown fundamental intrinsic properties provide categorical bases for known physical properties and also yield an account of consciousness. There are non-physicalist versions of this position, but some are amenable to physicalism, and Pereboom highlights such views in his treatment.

Pereboom defends a version of nonreductive physicalism, a view proposed by Hilary Putnam in the 1960s, according to which types of mental states are not identical to types of states at lower levels, such as the neural and the microphysical. The nonreductive position he defends departs from others in that it also rejects all token-identity (i.e., specific-instance-identity) claims for the relation between mental states and states at lower levels. The relation between the mental and the microphysical is material constitution, with the provision that this relation is not to be explicated by the notion of identity. But mental properties are nevertheless identical to higher-level compositional properties, properties that things have by virtue of the natures of their parts and relations among them. Pereboom contends that this view secures genuine mental causation, by contrast with the more commonly endorsed functionalist alternative. In this respect his position is perhaps a compromise with type-identity theory. Still, his view is not a reductive identity theory, since he holds that mental compositional properties are multiply realizable at any level more fundamental than the mental (e.g., the neural).

== Selected publications ==
=== Authored books ===
- — (February 19, 2001). Living Without Free Will (Hardcover). Cambridge Studies in Philosophy (1st ed.). Cambridge: Cambridge University Press. ISBN 9780521791984. ISSN 0950-6306. LCCN 00059877. OCLC 704452214.
  - — (November 2, 2006). Living Without Free Will (Paperback). Cambridge Studies in Philosophy (1st ed.). Cambridge: Cambridge University Press. ISBN 9780521029964. ISSN 0950-6306. OCLC 263662446.
  - — (July 23, 2009). Living Without Free Will (E-book). Cambridge Studies in Philosophy. Palo Alto, California: Cambridge University Press. doi:10.1017/CBO9780511498824. ISBN 9780511498824. ISSN 0950-6306. OCLC 263662446 – via ebrary.
- With Fischer, John Martin; Kane, Robert; Vargas, Manuel (July 30, 2007). Four Views on Free Will (Hardcover). Great Debates in Philosophy. Vol. 11 (1st illustrated ed.). Malden: Wiley-Blackwell. ISBN 9781405134859. OCLC 909978036.
  - —; —; —; — (September 11, 2007). Four Views on Free Will (Paperback). Great Debates in Philosophy. Vol. 11. Malden: Wiley-Blackwell. ISBN 9781405134866. OCLC 909978036.
  - —; —; —; — (February 4, 2009). Four Views on Free Will (E-book). Great Debates in Philosophy. Vol. 11. Hoboken: Wiley-Blackwell. ISBN 9781405182041. OCLC 780914948.
- — (March 22, 2011). Consciousness and the Prospects of Physicalism (Hardcover). Philosophy of Mind (1st ed.). New York: Oxford University Press. doi:10.1093/acprof:oso/9780199764037.001.0001. ISBN 9780199764037. LCCN 2010015401. OCLC 608297378.
  - — (December 1, 2016). Consciousness and the Prospects of Physicalism (Paperback). Philosophy of Mind. Oxford: Oxford University Press. ISBN 9780190649623. OCLC 956958881.
- — (May 15, 2014). Free Will, Agency, and Meaning in Life (Hardcover) (1st ed.). Oxford: Oxford University Press. doi:10.1093/acprof:oso/9780199685516.001.0001. ISBN 9780199685516. LCCN 2013943741. OCLC 893409087.
  - — (July 1, 2016). Free Will, Agency, and Meaning in Life (Paperback). New York: Oxford University Press. ISBN 9780198776864. OCLC 924626289.
- With McKenna, Michael (July 11, 2016). Free Will: A Contemporary Introduction (Hardcover) (1st ed.). New York: Routledge. ISBN 9780415996860. LCCN 2015044024. OCLC 298781448.
  - —; — (July 8, 2016). Free Will: A Contemporary Introduction (Paperback) (1st ed.). New York: Routledge. ISBN 9780415996877. LCCN 2015044024. OCLC 298781448.
  - —; — (July 1, 2016). Free Will: A Contemporary Introduction (E-book) (1st ed.). New York: Routledge. ISBN 9781315621548. OCLC 7390570968.

==== Edited books ====
- With Guignon, Charles, eds. (March 1, 1995). Existentialism: Basic Writings – Kierkegaard, Nietzsche, Heidegger, Sartre (Hardcover) (1st ed.). Indianapolis: Hackett Publishing Company. ISBN 9780872202146. OCLC 612089247.
  - —; —, eds. (October 15, 2001). Existentialism: Basic Writings (Hardcover) (2nd revised and expanded ed.). Indianapolis: Hackett Publishing Company. ISBN 9780872205963. LCCN 2001016881. OCLC 2001016881.
  - —; —, eds. (October 15, 2001). Existentialism: Basic Writings (Paperback) (2nd revised and expanded ed.). Indianapolis: Hackett Publishing Company. ISBN 9780872205956. LCCN 2001016881. OCLC 2001016881.
- —, ed. (September 1, 1997). Free Will (Hardcover). Hackett Readings in Philosophy (1st ed.). Indianapolis: Hackett Publishing Company. ISBN 9780872203730. LCCN 97027677. OCLC 37310800.
  - —, ed. (November 1, 1997). Free Will (Paperback). Hackett Readings in Philosophy (1st ed.). Indianapolis: Hackett Publishing Company. ISBN 9780872203723. LCCN 97027677. OCLC 37310800.
  - —, ed. (November 13, 2009). Free Will (Hardcover). Hackett Readings in Philosophy (2nd revised and expanded ed.). Indianapolis: Hackett Publishing Company. ISBN 9781603841306. LCCN 2009037563. OCLC 436946039.
  - —, ed. (November 13, 2009). Free Will (Paperback). Hackett Readings in Philosophy (2nd revised and expanded ed.). Indianapolis: Hackett Publishing Company. ISBN 9781603841290. LCCN 2009037563. OCLC 436946039.
  - —, ed. (November 13, 2009). Free Will (E-book). Hackett Readings in Philosophy (2nd revised and expanded ed.). Indianapolis: Hackett Publishing Company. ISBN 9781603848862. LCCN 2009037563. OCLC 797920017.
- —, ed. (October 1, 1999). The Rationalists: Critical Essays on Descartes, Spinoza, and Leibniz (Hardcover). Critical Essays on the Classics Series. With contributions by Robert M. Adams, Janet Broughton, John Carriero, Michael Della Rocca, Daniel Garber, Don Garrett, Paul Hoffman, Christia Mercer, Steven Nadler, Marleen Rozemond, Donald Rutherford, Margaret D. Wilson and David Wong (1st ed.). Lanham: Rowman & Littlefield. ISBN 9780847689101. LCCN 99016484. OCLC 613952448.
  - —, ed. (October 1, 1999). The Rationalists: Critical Essays on Descartes, Spinoza, and Leibniz (Paperback). Critical Essays on the Classics Series. With contributions by Robert M. Adams, Janet Broughton, John Carriero, Michael Della Rocca, Daniel Garber, Don Garrett, Paul Hoffman, Christia Mercer, Steven Nadler, Marleen Rozemond, Donald Rutherford, Margaret D. Wilson, and David Wong (1st ed.). Lanham: Rowman & Littlefield. ISBN 9780847689118. LCCN 99016484. OCLC 231842124.
- With Sie, Maureen, eds. (October 9, 2015). Basic Desert, Reactive Attitudes and Free Will (Hardcover) (1st ed.). New York: Routledge. ISBN 9781138949423. OCLC 995344091.
  - —; —, eds. (May 16, 2017). Basic Desert, Reactive Attitudes and Free Will (Paperback) (1st ed.). New York: Routledge. ISBN 9781138294912. OCLC 989034485.
  - —; —, eds. (October 2, 2017). Basic Desert, Reactive Attitudes and Free Will (E-book) (1st ed.). Routledge. ISBN 9781315669052.

=== Articles ===
- — (March 2, 2018) [First published August 21, 2009]. "Kant's Transcendental Arguments". In Zalta, Edward N. (ed.). Stanford Encyclopedia of Philosophy (Spring 2018 ed.). Stanford University: The Metaphysics Research Lab. ISSN 1095-5054.
- With Chignell, Andrew (December 21, 2016) [First published July 6, 2015]. "Natural Theology and Natural Religion". In Zalta, Edward N. (ed.). Stanford Encyclopedia of Philosophy (Spring 2017 ed.). Stanford University: The Metaphysics Research Lab. ISSN 1095-5054.
