= Consequence argument =

Philosophical argument against compatilibism by Peter van Inwagen

The Consequence Argument is a philosophical argument for the incompatibility of free will and determinism. The argument was most notably introduced by philosopher Peter van Inwagen in an article titled “The Incompatibility of Free Will and Determinism” (1975). According to van Inwagen, if determinism is true, then a complete description of the past together with the laws of nature is enough to determine the truth of any proposition. It follows that given determinism, the truth of any proposition is never such that we can do anything that could make the proposition true or false. In later work van Inwagen would state the argument as follows:

If determinism is true, then our acts are the consequences of the laws of nature and events in the remote past. But it is not up to us what went on before we were born, and neither is it up to us what the laws of nature are. Therefore, the consequences of these things (including our present acts) are not up to us.

If the above reasoning is correct, then compatibilism is false. The argument is, however, neutral with respect to the truth of hard determinism or libertarian free will. Adherents of either side often defend this argument as showing the inconsistency of accepting both determinism and free will.

== Background ==
Although the formulation of the argument that generates the most attention is attributed to van Inwagen, precursors of the argument exist in earlier writings as well. A genealogy of the consequence argument starts with two of Van Inwagen’s influences, Keith Lehrer and Carl Ginet, both of whom he acknowledged in his 1975 essay “The Incompatibility of Free Will and Determinism”.

While Van Inwagen coined the term “consequence argument” and contributed the most to the consequence argument as it goes today, he credits Carl Ginet for starting this conversation in Ginet’s essay “Might We Have No Choice?” published in Keith Lehrer’s 1966 book “Freedom and Determinism” Ginet put forward a prototype of the argument, stating that if determinism is true, we do not have free choice and cannot choose to do other than what we do. He laid out the groundwork later expanded on by van Inwagen, which was to invoke the laws of nature and the state of the world prior to and independently of the agent’s place within it. Ginet argued that because the agent did not control the state of the world prior to his birth, and the state of the world at that time directly caused his actions, the agent could not have control of his own actions. Ginet relied on the concept of free choice as requiring more than one genuine option for action at a given time. Because the laws of nature precede agency and dictate that things go a certain way, there is no way to do otherwise, as there is no other way things could have gone.

Building off of Ginet’s incompatibilist argument from the laws of nature and the state of the world, Van Inwagen first laid out a model of the consequence argument, which at the time he named his “main argument”. The seven-step argument proceeds by stating on logical terms the argument that that in a deterministic world, an agent’s capacity to alter the state affairs, which are necessarily entailed by the laws of nature and the prior state of the world, depends on the truth of at least one of two impossibilities: either disproving the laws of nature, or intervening in a state of affairs that occurred before the agent’s own birth. (See section on the Argument) The consequence argument was very powerful because it presented a significant challenge to compatibilist arguments, which revolved around the ability to change our reasons for acting.

Van Inwagen expanded his case in his 1983 book An Essay on Free Will, presenting three versions of the main argument from 1975. In the book, Van Inwagen explicates an argument termed rule Beta, which relates to the property of powerlessness, often called “N” to mean “Nobody could have ever done anything about.” This is seen as the silver bullet in Inwagen’s argument, and also the most controversial component, as it claims that the “powerlessness” property can transfer across conditional statements, allowing past necessity to entail future necessity. Rule Beta has thus been the main grounds for objections and the focus of much revision; since the book’s publication, several philosophers have suggested more refined versions of Rule Beta, including Inwagen himself, as a way of responding to concerns raised about its validity. (See Objections Section).

In 2015, Van Inwagen published an article reflecting on his 1983 book, 30 years later. He expressed some desire to change the way he had set things up, mostly relating to his word usage, and some semantic clarifications in response to objections that arose in regard to his presentation of the “could have done otherwise” principle. He also expressed that if he were to rewrite the book, he would avoid using the words “free” and “freely” altogether. He also rephrased Rule Beta such that rather than the property N meaning completely beyond anybody’s control, it would mean “humanly unalterable”.

As of today, the consequence argument is viewed as the most prominent and successful argument against compatibilism. In The Oxford Handbook of Free Will, Daniel Speak suggests that at this stage in its development, the argument itself has become something of a schema or an argument form that encompasses several variations on a theme. While it was pioneered by Ginet, Van Inwagen is widely credited with its popularization and with the legitimization of incompatibilism more broadly speaking.

== The Argument ==
Van Inwagen presents the argument as a reductio showing that if we assume determinism then it follows that nothing is ever up to us and therefore determinism is incompatible with free will. Determinism is the thesis that the laws of physics together with the state of the world at some time t, entail any future state of the world at t*. Free will is defined as a subject’s ability to do otherwise then they in fact choose to do. In other words, if we are sometimes free with respect to some proposition expressing a certain action p, then it is true that we could have rendered p false. Furthermore, consider some time long ago before any agents were around, call it t_{0}, and a proposition expressing the state of the world at t_{0} call it P_{0}. Using L to stand for the laws of physics, the argument can be stated thus:

1. If determinism is true, then L and P_{0} entail p.
2. If S had φ’d at t, then p would be false.
3. If (2) is true, then S could render p false.
4. If S could render p false, and if L and P_{0} entail p, then S could have rendered L and P_{0} false.
5. If S could have rendered the conjunction of L and P_{0} false, then S could have rendered L false.
6. If S could have rendered the conjunction of L and P_{0} false, then S could have rendered P_{0} false.
7. S could not have rendered L false.
8. S could not have rendered P_{0} false.
9. Therefore, if determinism is true, S could not render p false.

Premises (7) and (8) in the argument plausibly assume that it is impossible for a subject to change the laws of physics and change the past, respectively. Since p is just an arbitrary proposition standing for any truth about our world but in this case our actions, it follows that nothing we ever do could render p false. Another way to phrase this argument is that given the fixity of the laws and the fixity of the past together with the determinist thesis, no proposition p is ever up to us. van Inwagen puts it like this, “to deny that men have free will is to assert that what a man does do and what he can do coincide”.

== Objections ==
=== The No Past Objection ===
Joseph Keim Campbell is attributed with coining the main objection to the Consequence Argument, the No Past Objection. The No Past Objection (henceforth referred to as the NPO) proceeds by capitalizing on the reliance of the first and third versions of the Consequence argument on the existence of a past. Campbell argues that since it is possible that there be a free person with no past, call him Adam, then it is not necessarily the case that there be a past and thus the premise of these arguments that relies on a past are not necessarily true. In such a possible world it would be false that Adam’s freedom is restricted with respect to the past because there is no past for Adam.

The NPO faces scrutiny from minds such as Andrew M. Bailey. Bailey counters the NPO’s attack on the Consequence Argument with the Addition Argument, which is built on the principle that “freedom is freedom to add to the given past”[4]. This modification to the original Consequence Argument attempts to evade the No Past Objection by not necessarily requiring a past and thus the Adam case does not effectively refute the argument’s soundness.

=== The Agglomeration Objection ===
Another objection to van Inwagen’s original formulation of the argument has to do with the rule he uses to infer that no one could do anything to render p false. He suggests a plausible principle that states if p is not up to us, and p ⇒ q is not up to us, then q is likewise not up to us. Call this ‘not up to us’ operator N. Thus, if [Np & N(p & q)] ⇒ Nq. To illustrate, imagine that a world ending asteroid collides with the earth in the year 2100. So, N(an asteroid collides with the earth in the year 2100) & N(if an asteroid collides with the earth in the year 2100, then all life on earth ends in the year 2100). Therefore, N(all life ends in the year 2100). Thomas Mckay and David Johnson (1996) have pointed out that the rule used by van Inwagen implies agglomeration, which is uncontroversially invalid. For example, it seems correct to say that N(a fair coin does not land heads) and N(a fair coin does not land tails) but it isn’t correct to say that N(a fair coin does not land heads and a fair coin does not land tails) because someone could have tossed the coin.
