= Harry Frankfurt =

American philosopher (1929–2023)

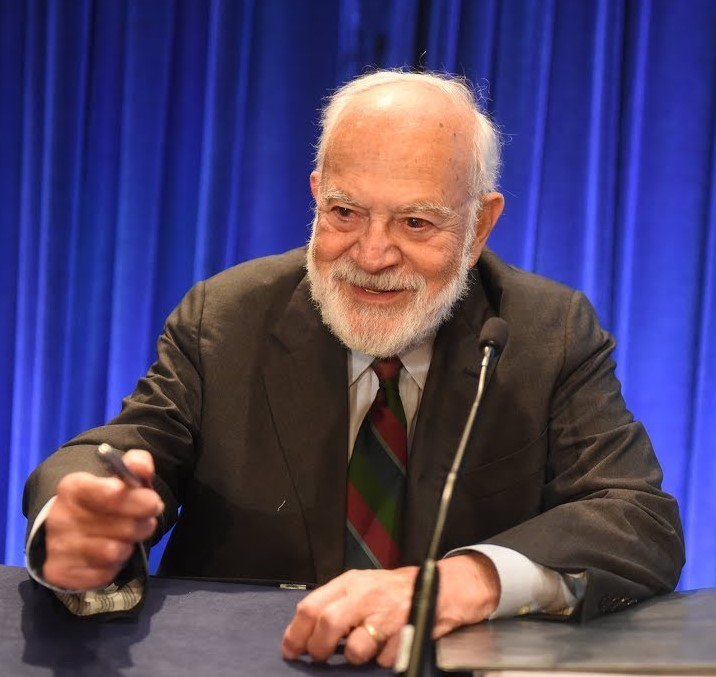
- Frankfurt in 2017
- Born: David Bernard Stern; May 29, 1929; Langhorne, Pennsylvania, U.S.
- Died: July 16, 2023 (aged 94); Santa Monica, California, U.S.
- Other name: Harry Gordon Frankfurt

Education
- Education: Johns Hopkins University (BA, PhD)
- Academic advisor: George Boas

Philosophical work
- Era: Contemporary philosophy
- Region: Western philosophy
- School: Analytic
- Institutions: Ohio State University; Binghamton University; Rockefeller University; Yale University; Princeton University
- Main interests: Moral philosophy; philosophy of mind; free will; philosophy of love; philosophy of action
- Notable ideas: Higher-order volition; immanent reflexivity of consciousness; Frankfurt's care–importance principle; principle of alternative possibilities; doctrine of sufficiency; Frankfurt cases; theory of bullshit

Harry Gordon Frankfurt (born David Bernard Stern; May 29, 1929 – July 16, 2023) was an American philosopher. He was a professor emeritus of philosophy at Princeton University, where he taught from 1990 until 2002. Frankfurt also taught at Yale University, Rockefeller University, and Ohio State University.

Frankfurt made significant contributions to such fields as ethics and philosophy of mind. The attitude of caring played a central role in his philosophy. To care about something means to see it as important and reflects the person's character. According to Frankfurt, a person is someone who has second-order volitions or who cares about what desires he or she has. He contrasts persons with wantons. Wantons are beings that have desires but do not care about which of their desires is translated into action. In the field of ethics, Frankfurt gave various influential counterexamples, so-called Frankfurt cases, against the principle that moral responsibility depends on the ability to do otherwise.

His most popular book is On Bullshit (2005), which discusses the distinction between bullshitting and lying, and was followed by On Truth (2006).

== Biography ==
=== Early life ===
Frankfurt was born at a home for unwed mothers in Langhorne, Pennsylvania, on May 29, 1929, and did not know his biological parents. Shortly after his birth, he was adopted by a middle-class Jewish family and given a new name, Harry Gordon Frankfurt. His adoptive parents, Bertha (née Gordon) and Nathan Frankfurt, a piano teacher and a bookkeeper, respectively, raised him in Brooklyn and Baltimore. He attended Johns Hopkins University, where he obtained his Bachelor of Arts in 1949 and Doctor of Philosophy in 1954, both in philosophy.

=== Career ===
Frankfurt was professor emeritus of philosophy at Princeton University. He previously taught at Ohio State University (1956–1962), SUNY Binghamton (1962–1963), Rockefeller University (from 1963 until the philosophy department was closed in 1976), Yale University (from 1976, where he served as chair of the philosophy department 1978–1987), and then Princeton University (1990–2002).

His major areas of interest included moral philosophy, philosophy of mind and action, and 17th-century rationalism. His 2005 book On Bullshit, originally published in 1986 as a paper on the concept of "bullshit", unexpectedly became a bestseller, which led to his making media appearances such as on Jon Stewart's late-night television program, The Daily Show. In this work he explains how bullshitting is different from lying, in that it is an act that has no regard for the truth. He argues that "It is impossible for someone to lie unless he thinks he knows the truth. Producing bullshit requires no such conviction." In 2006, he followed up with On Truth, a companion book in which he explored the dwindling appreciation in society for truth.

Among philosophers, he was for a time best known for his interpretation of Descartes's rationalism. His most influential work, however, is on freedom of the will (on which he wrote numerous important papers) based on his concept of higher-order volitions and for developing "Frankfurt cases" (also known as "Frankfurt counter-examples", which are thought experiments designed to demonstrate the possibility of situations in which a person could not have done other than he/she did, but in which our intuition is to say nonetheless that this feature of the situation does not prevent that person from being morally responsible). Frankfurt's view of compatibilism is perhaps the most influential version of compatibilism, developing the view that to be free is to have one's actions conform to one's more reflective desires. Frankfurt's version of compatibilism is the subject of a substantial number of citations. In 2004, he published a book on love and caring, The Reasons of Love.

Frankfurt was elected a Fellow of the American Academy of Arts and Sciences in 1995. He was a Visiting Fellow of All Souls College, Oxford University; he served as president, Eastern Division, American Philosophical Association; and he received grants and fellowships from the Guggenheim Foundation, the Andrew Mellon Foundation and the National Endowment for the Humanities.

== Philosophy ==
=== Caring and importance ===
According to Frankfurt, a lot of the philosophical discourse concerns either the domain of epistemology, which asks what we should believe, or ethics, which asks how we should act. He argues that there is another branch of inquiry that has received less attention, namely the question of what has importance or what we should care about. An agent cares about something if he/she has a certain attitude of the will: He/she sees the entity in question as important to them. For Frankfurt, what we care about reflects our personal character or who we are. This also affects the person on the practical level concerning how he/she acts and leads his/her life.

In the academic literature, caring is often understood as a subjective attitude in contrast to importance as an objective factor. On this view, the importance of something determines whether it is appropriate to care about it: people should care about important things but not about unimportant ones. Frankfurt defends a different perspective on this issue by arguing that caring about something makes this thing important. So when a person starts caring about something, this thing becomes important to them even if it was unimportant to them before. Frankfurt explains this in terms of needs: the caring attitude brings with it a need. Because of this need, the cared-for thing can affect the person's well-being and has thereby become important to them. Yitzhak Benbaji terms this relation between caring and importance "Frankfurt's care–importance principle". He rejects it based on the claim that at least some cases of the caring attitude are misguided. This usually involves situations in which the agent has a wrong belief that the object of their caring would affect their well-being. In one example, the agent follows a charlatan's health advice to avoid a certain type of food. Benbaji argues that this constitutes a counterexample because the person cares about avoiding this food even though it has no impact on their health or their well-being.

=== Personhood ===
Persons are characterized by certain attributes or capacities, such as reason, moral responsibility, and self-consciousness. However, there is wide disagreement, both within the academic discourse and between different cultures about what the essential features of personhood are. One influential and precisely formulated account of personhood is given by Frankfurt in his "Freedom of the Will and the Concept of a Person". He holds that persons are beings that have second-order volitions. A volition is an effective desire, i.e. a desire that the agent is committed to realizing. Not all desires become volitions: humans usually have many desires but put only some of them into action. For example, the agent may have one desire to eat an unhealthy cake but follows their other desire to have a healthy salad instead. In this case, eating the cake is a mere desire while eating the salad is a volition. Frankfurt places great importance on the difference between first- and second-order desires. Most regular desires, like the desire to eat healthy food or to buy a car, are first-order desires. Second-order desires are desires about desires. So the desire to have a desire to eat healthy food is a second-order desire. Entities with first-order desires care about what the world around them is like, for example, whether they own a car or not. Entities with second-order desires care also about themselves, i.e. what they themselves are like and what mental states they possess. A second-order desire becomes a second-order volition if it is effective, i.e. if the agent is committed to realizing it by fostering the corresponding first-order desire. Frankfurt sees this as the mark of personhood because entities with second-order volitions do not just have desires but care about which desires they have. So persons are committed to the desires they have.

According to Frankfurt, not every entity with a mind is a person. He refers to such entities as "wantons". Wantons have desires and follow them but do not care about their own will. In this regard, they are indifferent to which of their desires become effective and are translated into action. Frankfurt holds that personhood is an important feature of humans but not of other animals. However, even some humans may be wantons at times. Various of Frankfurt's examples of such cases involve some forms of akrasia in which a person acts according to a first-order desire that he/she does not want to have on the second order. For example, a struggling drug addict may follow his/her first-order desire to take drugs despite having a second-order desire to stop wanting drugs.

=== Moral responsibility and principle of alternative possibilities ===
The term "moral responsibility" refers to the forward-looking moral obligation to perform certain actions and to the backward-looking status of being worthy of blame or praise for having done something or having failed to do so. An important principle in this regard is the principle of alternative possibilities. It states that "a person is morally responsible for what she has done only if she could have done otherwise". Having this ability to do otherwise is usually associated with having free will. So under normal circumstances, a person is morally responsible for stealing someone's lunch at the cafeteria. However, this may not be the case under special circumstances, for example, if a neurological disorder compelled them to do it. Frankfurt has rejected the principle of alternative possibilities based on a series of counterexamples, the so-called "Frankfurt cases". In one example, Allison's father has implanted a computer chip in Allison's head without her knowing. This chip would force Allison to walk her dog. However, Allison freely decides to do so and the chip is thus not activated. Frankfurt argues that, in this case, Allison is morally responsible for walking her dog even though she lacked the ability to do otherwise. The crux of this and similar cases is that the agent is morally responsible because he/she acted in accordance with his/her own will. This is so despite the fact that, usually unbeknownst to the agent, there was no real alternative. This line of thought has led Frankfurt to advocate a form of compatibilism: If free will and moral responsibility do not depend on the ability to do otherwise, then they could even exist in a fully deterministic world. Frankfurt cases have provoked a significant discussion of the principle of alternative possibilities. However, not everyone agrees that they are successful at disproving it.

=== Equality ===
Frankfurt rejected economic equality as an intrinsically valuable moral ideal, arguing instead that what matters morally is whether people have enough. He termed this view the "doctrine of sufficiency": if everyone had sufficient resources, differences in wealth would not in themselves be morally significant. He also argued that treating equality as an end in itself could be alienating, since it encourages people to assess their circumstances by comparison with others rather than by reference to their own needs and what would make their lives satisfactory. For Frankfurt, sufficiency referred not merely to subsistence but to the resources required for a good life, although it did not imply that a person with enough could have no interest in acquiring more. His account has been criticized for leaving the threshold of sufficiency indeterminate and for aspects of its economic argument; Jason Koutoufaris-Malandrinos has suggested that Frankfurt's position may ultimately resemble a form of egalitarianism that permits economic differences within upper and lower limits more than a strict rejection of egalitarianism.

== Personal life and death ==
Harry Frankfurt was first married to Marilyn Rothman. They had two daughters. The marriage ended in divorce. He then married Joan Gilbert.

Frankfurt was an amateur classical pianist. He started taking piano lessons from an early age, initially from his mother who hoped that he might pursue a career as a concert pianist. Frankfurt continued to play piano and receive lessons throughout his life, alongside his philosophical career. According to Frankfurt, becoming a professor of philosophy was acceptable to his mother, seeing as it was "close enough" to her other ambition for him, which was to become a rabbi.

Frankfurt died of congestive heart failure in Santa Monica, California, on July 16, 2023, at age 94.

== Bibliography ==
- Demons, Dreamers and Madmen: The Defense of Reason in Descartes's Meditations. Princeton University Press. 2007 [1970]. ISBN 978-0691134161.
- The Importance of What We Care About: Philosophical Essays. Cambridge University Press. 1988. ISBN 978-0521336116.
- Necessity, Volition, and Love. Cambridge University Press. 1999. ISBN 978-0521633956.
- The Reasons of Love. Princeton University Press. 2004. ISBN 978-0691126241.
- On Bullshit. Princeton University Press. 2005. ISBN 0-691-12294-6.
- On Truth. Random House. 2006. ISBN 0-307-26422-X.
- Taking Ourselves Seriously & Getting It Right. Stanford University Press. 2006. ISBN 0-8047-5298-2.
- On Inequality. Princeton University Press. 2015. ISBN 978-0691167145.
- "Donald Trump Is BS, Says Expert in BS". Time. May 12, 2016.

== Interviews ==
- "The Necessity of Love" in Alex Voorhoeve Conversations on Ethics. Oxford University Press, 2009. ISBN 978-0-19-921537-9 (A discussion of his views on moral responsibility, caring and love, and the relationship of his later work on the structure of the will to his earlier work on Descartes.)

== See also ==
- American philosophy
- List of American philosophers
