= Kadri Vihvelin =

Professor of Philosophy

Kadri Vihvelin is a Professor of Philosophy at the University of Southern California, best known for her work on metaphysics and ethics, particularly on free will, time travel, causation, counterfactuals, dispositions, and moral responsibility. Vihvelin is the author of Causes, Laws, and Free Will: Why Determinism Doesn’t Matter (Oxford University Press, 2013), a widely cited defense of compatibilism which argues that determinism does not undermine free will. She studied law at the University of Oxford and completed her doctoral dissertation, Ability and being able to do otherwise, at Cornell University in 1989 where her adviser was Robert Stalnaker. Vihvelin made an appearance on Episode 16 of The Free Will Show, a podcast on free will. The interview was later published as a chapter of the associated book (Oxford University Press, 2024).

== Philosophical positions ==
=== Dispositional account of free will ===
Kadri Vihvelin offers a dispositional account of free will, which hinges on how we interpret the "can" in “We have free will only if we can choose otherwise.” To have free will is to make choices on the basis of reasons, and to possess this ability, according to Vihvelin, is to have a bundle of dispositions. Dispositions include things like being able to speak a language or run or walk. They also include dispositions required to choose, such as the capacity to form and revise beliefs in light of evidence or argument, and to form intentions in response to desires.

Someone who speaks both English and French may choose to speak English at a given moment; yet even if determinism holds, they still retain the disposition to speak French at that time – that disposition does not vanish. In the same way, Vihvelin argues that when a person makes a decision, they continue to possess the bundle of dispositions that would have enabled them to choose otherwise. The capacity is not lost simply because one option was carried out. This is how, on her account, someone could have chosen otherwise, and why they have free will.

Vihvelin’s approach is cited as an example of what has been called the "new dispositionalism".

=== Time travel ===
One puzzle in the philosophy of time travel is whether someone could travel back in time and kill themselves (an example temporal paradox). Vihvelin argues that while time travel is metaphysically possible, a time traveler could not kill themselves. The time traveler could still have free will, for instance according to the dispositional account. They could form the intention to kill their younger self; however, the attempt would necessarily fail. She offers a counterfactual logic argument to make the case, building on the intuition that the existence of the adult time traveler presupposes the survival of their younger counterpart, and this causal chain cannot be broken.

== Selected works ==
- Vihvelin, K. (2013). Causes, laws, and free will: Why determinism doesn't matter. Oxford University Press.
- Vihvelin, K. (2004). Free will demystified: A dispositional account. Philosophical Topics, 32(1/2), 427–450.
- Vihvelin, K. (2022), Arguments for Incompatibilism, The Stanford Encyclopedia of Philosophy (Fall 2022 Edition), Edward N. Zalta & Uri Nodelman (eds.).
- Vihvelin, K. (2000). Libertarian compatibilism. Philosophical Perspectives, 14, 139–166.
- Vihvelin, K. (1996). What time travelers cannot do. Philosophical Studies: An International Journal for Philosophy in the Analytic Tradition, 81(2/3), 315–330.
- Vihvelin, K. (2000). Freedom, foreknowledge, and the principle of alternate possibilities. Canadian Journal of Philosophy, 30(1), 1–23.
- Vihvelin, K. (1991). Freedom, causation, and counterfactuals. Philosophical Studies: An International Journal for Philosophy in the Analytic Tradition, 64(2), 161–184.
- Vihvelin, K. (1988). The modal argument for incompatibilism. Philosophical Studies: An International Journal for Philosophy in the Analytic Tradition, 53(2), 227–244.
- Vihvelin, K. (1995). Causes, effects and counterfactual dependence. Australasian Journal of Philosophy, 73(4), 560–573.
- Vihvelin, K., & Tomkow, T. (2005). The dif. The Journal of Philosophy, 102(4), 183–205.
- Vihvelin, K. (1989). Ability and being able to do otherwise [PhD thesis]. Cornell University.
