= Higher-order volition =

Philosophical term

Higher-order volitions (or higher-order desire), as opposed to action-determining volitions, are volitions about volitions. Higher-order volitions are potentially more often guided by long-term beliefs and reasoning. A higher-order volition can go unfulfilled due to uncontrolled lower-order volitions.

== History ==
The concept of higher-order volitions was introduced by Harry Frankfurt, who used it to explain free will independently of determinism, the thesis that what happens in the world is determined by predictable natural laws. However, this is made implausible by Heisenberg's uncertainty principle and resulting quantum noise. But even if the world were governed by such laws, one could be free in the sense that higher-order volitions determined the primacy of first-order desires. This view is called compatibilism.

An example for a failure to follow higher-order volitions is the drug addict who takes drugs even though they would like to quit taking drugs. According to Frankfurt, the drug addict has established free will when their higher-order volition to stop wanting drugs determines the precedence of their changing, action-determining desires either to take drugs or not to take drugs.

However, a higher order desire as described by Mark Alfano in his book Moral Psychology: An Introduction is "a desire about another(s) desire". In his example, Mark Alfano visualised a 'friend' whose birthday is coming up, you love her and hence wish to 'please' or 'surprise' her. To be 'motivated' to give your friend a special birthday present, you need to want to do something she wants. That want of yours, in philosophical jargon, this is called a higher order desire.

The philosopher John Locke already claimed that free will was the ability to stop before making a decision, to consider what would be best to do, and the ability to decide and act based on the outcome of that thinking, which could be seen as equivalent to forming a higher-order volition. Locke concludes that when it comes to "chusing a remote [i.e., future] Good as an end to be pursued", agents are "at Liberty in respect of willing" and that "in [the power to suspend the prosecution of one's desires] lies the liberty Man has", that the power to suspend is "the source of all liberty". Locke argues that if the will were determined by the perceived greater good, every agent would be consistently focused on the attainment of "the infinite eternal Joys of Heaven", which consequently would be the topmost higher-order volition to win Pascal's wager, corresponding to the drug addict's desire to survive his drug addiction.

== See also ==
- Akrasia
- Meta-emotion
