= On Truth =

Book by Harry Frankfurt

- Author: Harry Frankfurt
- Subject: Truth
- Publisher: Knopf
- Publication date: 2006-10-31
- ISBN: 9780307264220
- OCLC: 70259102
- Preceded by: On Bullshit

On Truth is a 2006 book by Harry Frankfurt, a follow-up to his 2005 book On Bullshit. It develops the argument that people should care about truth, regardless of intent to be truthful. It explicitly avoids defining "truth" beyond the concept commonly held, which corresponds to reality.
