= Frankfurt cases =

Philosophical argument

Frankfurt cases (also known as Frankfurt counterexamples or Frankfurt-style cases) were presented by philosopher Harry Frankfurt in 1969 as counterexamples to the principle of alternate possibilities (PAP), which holds that an agent is morally responsible for an action only if that person could have done otherwise.

== Principle of alternate possibilities ==
The principle of alternate possibilities (PAP) forms part of an influential argument for the incompatibility of responsibility and causal determinism, often called the core argument for incompatibilism. This argument is detailed below:

1. PAP: An agent is responsible for an action only if said agent could have done otherwise.
2. An agent could have done otherwise only if causal determinism is false.
3. Therefore, an agent is responsible for an action only if causal determinism is false.

Traditionally, compatibilists (defenders of the compatibility of free will and causal determinism, like A. J. Ayer, Walter Terence Stace, and Daniel Dennett) reject premise two. On a compatibilist analysis, an agent could have done otherwise just in case the counterfactual conditional 'if the agent had wanted to do otherwise, then they would have done otherwise' is true. Importantly, this counterfactual conditional can be true without causal determinism being false. Therefore, an agent could have done otherwise without causal determinism being false. Thus, 2. is false. Incompatibilists reject the counterfactual conditionals analysis of alternate possibilities.

== Frankfurt's objection ==
From the PAP definition "a person is morally responsible for what they have done only if they could have done otherwise", Frankfurt infers that a person is not morally responsible for what they have done if they could not have done otherwise – a point with which he takes issue: our theoretical ability to do otherwise, he says, does not necessarily make it possible for us to do otherwise.

Frankfurt's examples are significant because they suggest an alternative way to defend the compatibility of moral responsibility and determinism, in particular by rejecting the first premise of the argument. According to this view, responsibility is compatible with determinism because responsibility does not require the freedom to do otherwise.

Frankfurt's examples involve agents who are intuitively responsible for their behavior even though they lack the freedom to act otherwise. Here is a typical case:

Suppose someone (Black, let us say) wants Jones to perform a certain action. Black is prepared to go to considerable lengths to get his way, but he prefers to avoid showing his hand unnecessarily. So he waits until Jones is about to make up his mind what to do, and he does nothing unless it is clear to him (Black is an excellent judge of such things) that Jones is going to decide to do something other than what he wants him to do. If it does become clear that Jones is going to decide to do something else, Black takes effective steps to ensure that Jones decides to do, and that he does do, what he wants him to do. Whatever Jones's initial preferences and inclinations, then, Black will have his way.

What steps will Black take, if he believes he must take steps, in order to ensure that Jones decides and acts as he wishes? Anyone with a theory concerning what "could have done otherwise" means may answer this question for [themselves] by describing whatever measures [they] would regard as sufficient to guarantee that, in the relevant sense, Jones cannot do otherwise. Let Black pronounce a terrible threat... Let Black give Jones a potion, or put him under hypnosis... [o]r let Black manipulate the minute processes of Jones's brain and nervous system in some more direct way, so that causal forces running in and out of his synapses and along the poor man's nerves determine that he chooses to act and that he does act in the one way and not in any other...

Now suppose that Black never has to show his hand because Jones, for reasons of his own, decides to perform and does perform the very action Black wants him to perform. In that case, it seems clear, Jones will bear precisely the same moral responsibility for what he does as he would have borne if Black had not been ready to take steps to ensure that he do it. It would be quite unreasonable to excuse Jones for his action, or to withhold the praise to which it would normally entitle him, on the basis of the fact that he could not have done otherwise.

If Frankfurt is correct in suggesting both that Jones is morally responsible for taking the action Black wants him to take and that he is not free to do otherwise, then moral responsibility, in general, does not require that an agent have the freedom to do otherwise (that is, the principle of alternate possibilities is false). Thus, even if causal determinism is true, and even if determinism removes the freedom to do otherwise, there is no reason to doubt that people can still be morally responsible for their behavior.

Having presented his counterargument against the principle of alternate possibilities, Frankfurt suggests that it be revised to take into account the fallacy of the notion that coercion precludes an agent from moral responsibility. It must be only because of coercion that the agent acts as they do. The best definition, by his reckoning, is this: "[A] person is not morally responsible for what [they have] done if [they] did it only because [they] could not have done otherwise".

== Criticism ==
One of the first objections raised by opponents of the Frankfurt-style cases is the two-horned dilemma. This objection was most notably raised by philosophers such as Widerker, Ginet, and Kane. The two-horned dilemma focuses on the connection between the agent's inclination and the agent's decision. This connection can be either deterministic or indeterministic.

If the connection between the agent's inclination and the agent's decision is deterministic, then proponents of the Frankfurt-style cases are charged with begging the question. A deterministic connection begs the question because proponents of Frankfurt-style cases are assuming the very thing that is being debated, that moral responsibility does not require alternate possibilities or the ability to do otherwise. Suppose the agent's inclination is causally sufficient for bringing about the agent's decision. This would mean that the agent was determined to make that decision prior to any kind of decision-making. Thus, the agent did not freely come to the decision for reasons of her own. Opponents of the Frankfurt-style cases would immediately contend that the agent is not morally responsible. This is because they are operating from the get-go that moral responsibility requires free will. Therefore, if the Frankfurt-style cases are operating within a metaphysically deterministic framework, then proponents of Frankfurt-style cases cannot reasonably expect their opponents to be convinced.

On the other hand, if the connection between the agent's inclination and the agent's decision is indeterministic, then opponents of the Frankfurt-style cases argue that the agent has the ability to do otherwise. This is problematic for proponents of the Frankfurt-style cases because they are supposed to show a situation where an agent is morally responsible for the decision and yet is unable to truly do otherwise. Suppose the agent's inclination and the agent's decision is indeterministic. This means that the agent's inclination is not necessarily indicative of what the agent's decision will be. Thus, it is possible for the agent to show the correct inclination, evade the computer device, but then make the "wrong" decision. Even if the computer device kicks in after the "wrong decision", the agent still encountered the ability to do otherwise. This kind of Frankfurt-style case would fail to present a situation where an agent is morally responsible while lacking alternate possibilities.

== Responses ==
There have been a number of responses to the two-horned dilemma. One response has been to argue that a deterministic connection does not actually beg the question. Fischer has argued for this response by arguing that the Frankfurt-style case cannot stand alone, but must be taken in conjunction with other arguments. These other arguments are supposed to show that causal determinism in and of itself and apart from ruling out alternate possibilities does not threaten moral responsibility.

A second response is to revise the Frankfurt-style cases. This revision consists in creating a case with an explicit indeterministic connection where the agent is still morally responsible without any alternate possibilities. These kind of Frankfurt-style cases do it by incorporating buffer zones that act to eliminate alternate possibilities.

Michael Otsuka proposes to reject PAP in favor of a different incompatibilist principle, the principle of avoidable blame.

== Legacy ==
The responses to the Frankfurt cases are still being debated.
