= Compatibilism =

Philosophical concept about free will

Compatibilism is the belief that free will and determinism are mutually compatible and that it is possible to believe in both without being logically inconsistent. The opposing belief, that the thesis of determinism is logically incompatible with the classical thesis of free will, is known as "incompatibilism".

Compatibilists often believe that freedom can be present or absent in situations for reasons that have nothing to do with metaphysics. In other words, that causal determinism does not exclude the truth of possible future outcomes. Because free will is often seen as a necessary prerequisite for moral responsibility, compatibilism is commonly used to support compatibility between moral responsibility and determinism.

Similarly, political liberty is a non-metaphysical concept. Statements of political liberty, such as the United States Bill of Rights, assume moral liberty: the ability to choose to do otherwise than what one does.

== History ==
Compatibilism was championed by the ancient Stoics and some medieval scholastics. More specifically, scholastics like Thomas Aquinas and later Thomists (such as Domingo Báñez) are often interpreted as holding that human action can be free, even though an agent in some strong sense could not do otherwise than what they did. Whereas Aquinas is often interpreted to maintain rational compatibilism (i.e., an action can be determined by rational cognition and yet free), later Thomists, such as Báñez, develop a sophisticated theory of theological determinism, according to which actions of free agents, despite being free, are, on a higher level, determined by infallible divine decrees manifested in the form of "physical premotion" (praemotio physica), a deterministic intervention of God into the will of a free agent required to reduce the will from potency to act. A strong incompatibilist view of freedom was, on the other hand, developed in the Franciscan tradition, especially by Duns Scotus, and later upheld and further developed by Jesuits, especially Luis de Molina and Francisco Suárez. In the early modern era, compatibilism was maintained by Age of Enlightenment philosophers such as David Hume and Thomas Hobbes.

During the 20th century, compatibilists presented novel arguments that differed from the classical arguments of Hume, Hobbes, and John Stuart Mill. Importantly, Harry Frankfurt popularized what are now known as Frankfurt counterexamples to argue for semicompatibilism, the view that determinism is compatible with moral responsibility regardless of its compatibility with free will, and developed a positive account of semicompatibilism based on higher-order volitions. Other "new compatibilists" include Gary Watson, Susan R. Wolf, P. F. Strawson, Kadri Vihvelin, and R. Jay Wallace. Contemporary compatibilists range from the philosopher and cognitive scientist Daniel Dennett, particularly in his works Elbow Room (1984) and Freedom Evolves (2003), to the existentialist philosopher Frithjof Bergmann. Perhaps the most renowned contemporary defender of semicompatibilism is John Martin Fischer. Other semicompatibilists include David P. Hunt and Alfred Mele.

A 2020 survey found that 59% of English-publishing philosophers accept or lean towards compatibilism.

== Defining free will ==
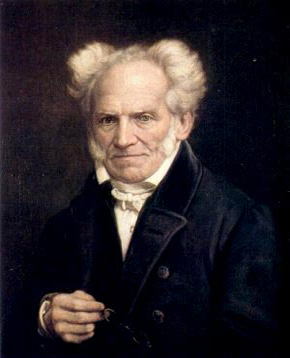
Arthur Schopenhauer

Compatibilists often define an instance of "free will" as one in which the agent had the freedom to act according to their own motivation. That is, the agent was not coerced or restrained. Arthur Schopenhauer famously said: "Man can do what he wills but he cannot will what he wills". In other words, although an agent may often be free to act according to a motive, the nature of that motive is determined. This definition of free will does not rely on the truth or falsity of causal determinism. This view also makes free will close to autonomy, the ability to live according to one's own rules, as opposed to being submitted to external domination.

Daniel Dennett expands on this idea in his book Elbow Room, arguing that in seeking free will we must consider what exactly is desired in the concept of free will. He argues that if one becomes convinced of the need for some capacity, such as the ability to have done otherwise, it is because we have become convinced that this capacity is necessary "for the sort of free will that any responsible, dignified, moral agent must have". Dennett then says the following regarding what is requested of free will:

What we want when we want free will is the power to decide our courses of action, and to decide them wisely, in light of our expectations and desires. We want to be in control of ourselves, and not under the control of others.

(. . .)

We want, moreover, to have enough elbow room in the world so that when we exercise these powers, it is not always a matter of settling for the only desperate course of action that has a chance of fulfilling our desires.

— Daniel Dennett, Elbow Room, p. 184

Dennett argues that determinism itself does not restrict us from reaching or accomplishing any of that which we seek out of free will, and so determinism is compatible with free will, or at least any "free will worth wanting".

=== Alternatives as imaginary ===
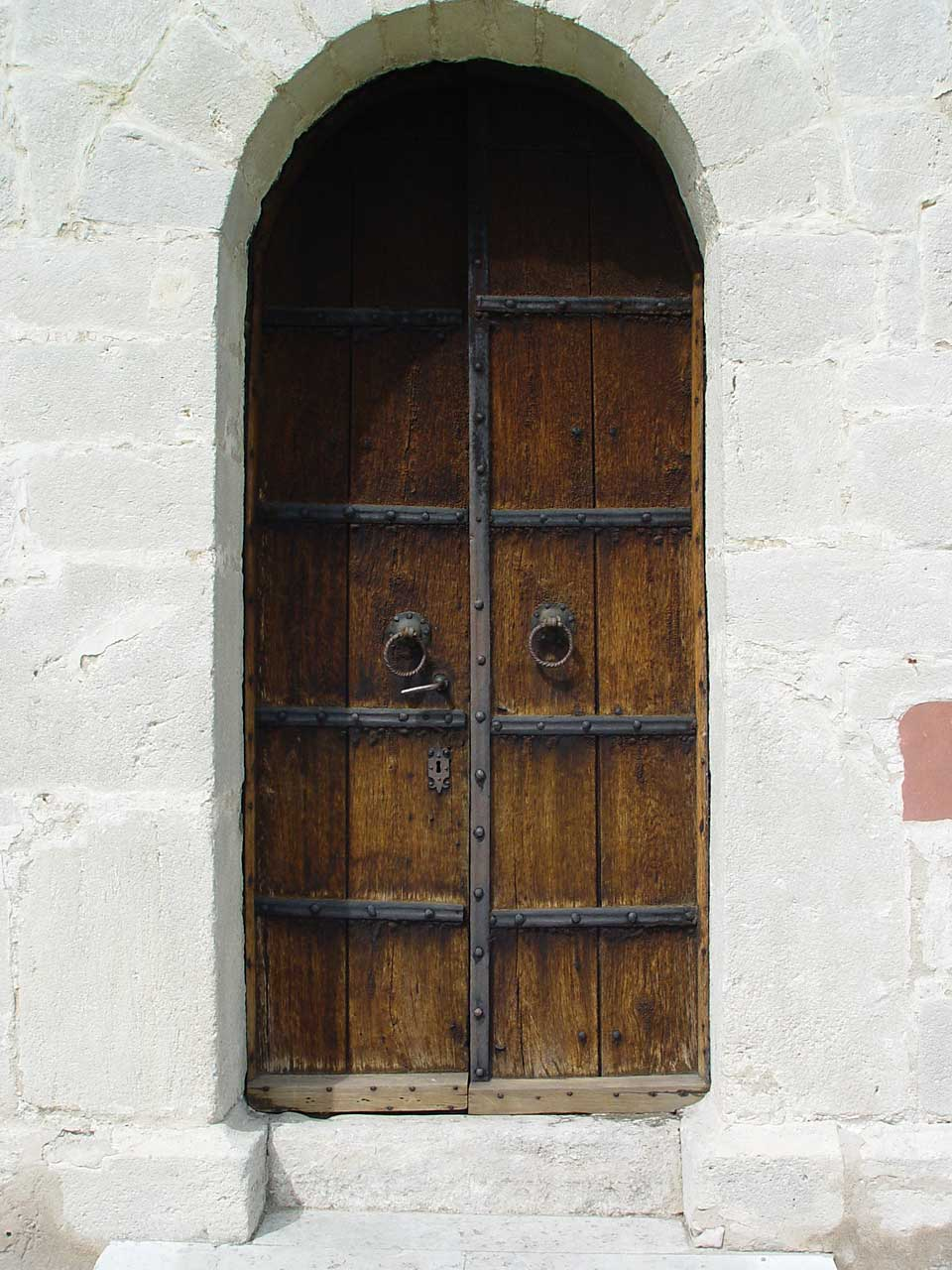
Schrödinger's door: Saying "there may be a person behind that door" merely expresses ignorance about the one, determined reality.

Some compatibilists hold both causal determinism (all effects have causes) and logical determinism (the future is already determined) to be true. Thus statements about the future (e.g., "it will rain tomorrow") are either true or false when spoken today. This compatibilist free will should not be understood as the ability to choose differently in an identical situation. A compatibilist may believe that a person can decide between several choices, but the choice is always determined by external factors. If the compatibilist says "I may visit tomorrow, or I may not," he is saying that he does not know what he will choose—whether he will choose to follow the subconscious urge to go or not.

=== Non-naturalism ===
Alternatives to strictly naturalist physics, such as mind–body dualism positing a mind or soul existing apart from one's body while perceiving, thinking, choosing freely, and as a result acting independently on the body, include both traditional religious metaphysics and less common newer compatibilist concepts. Also consistent with both autonomy and Darwinism, they allow for free personal agency based on practical reasons within the laws of physics. While less popular among 21st-century philosophers, non-naturalist compatibilism is present in most if not almost all religions.

=== Dispositional account ===
Kadri Vihvelin offers a dispositional account of free will, which hinges on how we interpret the "can" in "We have free will only if we can choose otherwise." To have free will is to make choices on the basis of reasons, and to possess this ability, according to Vihvelin, is to have a bundle of dispositions. Dispositions include things like being able to speak a language or run or walk. They also include dispositions required to choose, such as the capacity to form and revise beliefs in light of evidence or argument, and to form intentions in response to desires.

Someone who speaks both English and French could choose to speak English at a given moment; however, even if determinism holds, they still had the disposition to speak French at that time – the disposition didn’t vanish. Similarly, according to Vihvelin’s argument, someone who makes a particular decision also retains the bundle of disposition to have chosen otherwise – that capacity isn’t lost simply because one option was selected. This is how they could have chosen otherwise, and why they have free will.

== Criticism ==
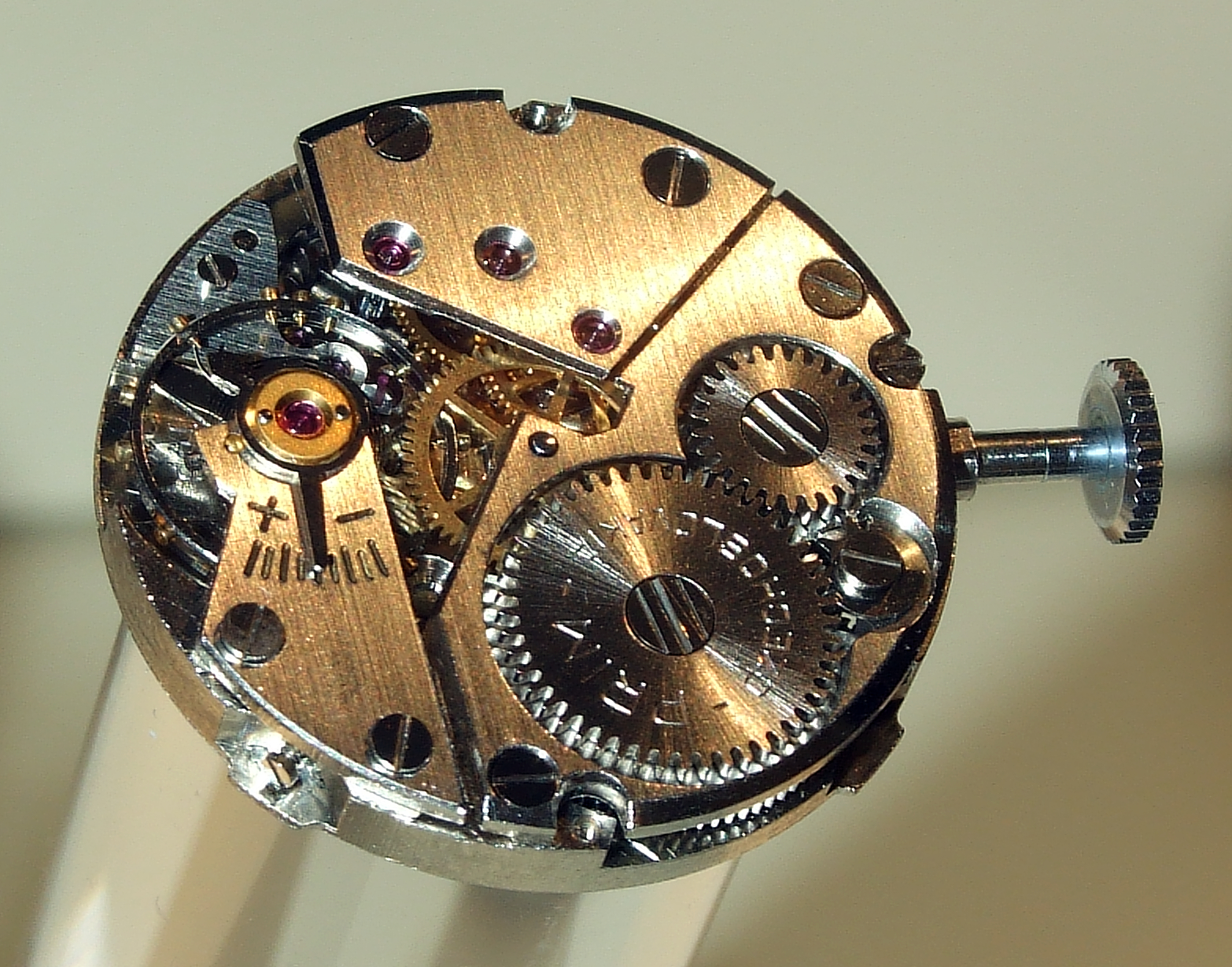
Compatibilism has much in common with "hard determinism", including moral systems and a belief in determinism itself.

A prominent criticism of compatibilism is Peter van Inwagen's consequence argument.

Critics of compatibilism often focus on the definitions of free will: incompatibilists may agree that the compatibilists are showing something to be compatible with determinism, but they think that this something ought not to be called "free will". Incompatibilists might accept the "freedom to act" as a necessary criterion for free will, but doubt that it is sufficient. The incompatibilists believe that free will refers to genuine (i.e., absolute, ultimate, physical) alternate possibilities for beliefs, desires, or actions, rather than merely counterfactual ones.

The direct predecessor to compatibilism was soft determinism (a term coined by William James, which he used pejoratively). Soft determinism is the view that we (ordinary humans) have free will and determinism is true. (Compatibilists, by contrast, take no stand on the truth-value of determinism.) James accused the soft determinists of creating a "quagmire of evasion" by stealing the name of freedom to mask their underlying determinism. Immanuel Kant called it a "wretched subterfuge" and "word jugglery". Kant's argument introduces the view that, while all empirical phenomena must result from determining causes, human thought introduces something seemingly not found elsewhere in nature – the ability to conceive of the world in terms of how it ought to be, or how it might otherwise be. For Kant, subjective reasoning is necessarily distinct from how the world is empirically. Because of its capacity to distinguish is from ought, reasoning can "spontaneously" originate new events without being itself determined by what already exists. It is on this basis that Kant argues against a version of compatibilism in which, for instance, the actions of the criminal are comprehended as a blend of determining forces and free choice, which Kant regards as misusing the word free. Kant proposes that taking the compatibilist view involves denying the distinctly subjective capacity to re-think an intended course of action in terms of what ought to happen.

== See also ==
- Illusionism (free will)
- Libertarianism (metaphysics)
- Semicompatibilism
