= Importance =

Property of things that make a difference

Importance is a property of entities that matter or make a difference. For example, World War II was an important event and Albert Einstein was an important person because of how each affected the world. There are disagreements in the academic literature about what type of difference is required. According to the causal impact view, something is important if it has a big causal impact on the world. This view is rejected by various theorists, who insist that an additional aspect is required: that the impact in question makes a value difference. This is often understood in terms of how the important thing affects the well-being of people. In this view, World War II was important, not just because it brought about many wide-ranging changes, but because these changes had severe negative impacts on the well-being of the people involved. The difference in question is usually understood counterfactually as the contrast between how the world is and how the world would have been without the existence of the important entity. It is often argued that importance claims are context- or domain-dependent. This means that they either explicitly or implicitly assume a certain domain in relation to which something matters. For example, studying for an exam is important in the context of academic success but not in the context of world history. Importance comes in degrees: to be important usually means to matter more within the domain in question than most of the other entities within this domain.

The term "importance" is often used in overlapping ways with various related terms, such as "meaningfulness", "value", and "caring". Theorists frequently try to elucidate these terms by comparing them to show what they have in common and how they differ. A meaningful life is usually also important in some sense. But meaningfulness has additional requirements: life should be guided by the agent's intention and directed at realizing some form of higher purpose. In some contexts, to say that something is important means the same as saying that it is valuable. More generally, however, importance refers not to value itself but to a value difference. This difference may also be negative: some events are important because they have very bad consequences. Importance is often treated as an objective feature in contrast to the subjective attitude of caring about something or ascribing importance to it. Ideally, the two overlap: people subjectively care about objectively important things. Nonetheless, the two may come apart when people care about unimportant things or fail to care about important things. Some theorists distinguish between instrumental importance relative to a specific goal in contrast to a form of importance based on intrinsic or final value. A closely related distinction is between importance relative to someone and absolute or unrestricted importance.

The concept of importance is central to numerous fields and issues. Many people desire to be important or to lead an important life. It has been argued that this is not always a good goal since it can also be realized negatively: by causing a lot of harm and thereby making an important but negative value difference. Common desires that are closely related include wanting wealth, fame, and power. In the realm of ethics, the importance of something often determines how one should act towards this thing, for example, by paying attention to it or by protecting it. In this regard, importance is a normative property, meaning that importance claims constitute reasons for actions, emotions, and other attitudes. On a psychological level, considerations of the relative importance of the aspects of a situation help the individual simplify its complexity by focusing only on its most significant features. A central discussion in the context of the meaning of life concerns the question of whether human life is important on the cosmic level. Nihilists and absurdists usually give a negative response to this question. This pessimistic outlook can in some cases cause an existential crisis. In the field of artificial intelligence, implementing artificial reasoning to assess the importance of information poses a significant challenge when trying to deal with the complexity of real-world situations.

== Definition and essential features ==
Importance is a property of entities that make a difference in the world. So for something to be important, it has to impact the world around it. For example, World War II was an important event in history both because of the suffering it caused and because of the long-term political changes it affected. Or in the field of medicine, Alexander Fleming was an important person because he discovered penicillin and thereby made a difference to the health of many people since then. Things that lack importance, on the other hand, could be removed without affecting any significant change to the world. Nonetheless, it seems that making a difference is not sufficient: even unimportant things usually make differences, however trivial they may be. An uncontroversial but circular definition holds that something is important if it makes an important difference.

Various suggestions have been made to give a more substantial account of the nature of this difference. This is necessary to give a precise definition that can distinguish important from unimportant things. The idea behind such an approach is that there are many ways to make an important difference and there should be some element they all share in common. According to the causal impact view, all that matters is the extent of the causal impact a thing has in its domain or on the world at large. Many theorists require as an additional element that this impact affects the intrinsic value of the world, often in terms of promoting someone's well-being. The difference between these views matters for various issues. For example, it has been argued that human life lacks importance on a cosmic level when judged based on its causal impact but has it in relation to the value difference it makes. Other central aspects of importance are its context-dependence, i.e. that importance claims usually assess the significance of something relative to a certain domain, and its relationality, i.e. that the extent of the impact is usually assessed relative to the impact of other entities within this domain. Importance manifests in degrees: the more important something is, the bigger the difference it makes.

=== Causal impact view ===
According to the causal impact view, a thing is important if it has a sufficiently big causal impact on a large scale. This view has a strong initial plausibility since it is true for many events we see as important. It is reflected in the intuition that, to become important, one must interact with the world and change it. For example, Napoleon is seen as an individual of world-historic importance because of how his decisions affected the course of history and changed the lives of many Europeans. Something similar is true for many world-historic figures: they affected how many people lived, perceived them, and responded to them. However, various arguments have been raised against the causal impact view, often based on counterexamples to the effect that having a big causal impact is neither sufficient nor necessary for importance. For example, it has been argued that the invention of a device that can bring about cosmic changes to the orbits of planets in faraway galaxies would not be important if these changes had no impact on anyone's well-being. Or in analogy to The Myth of Sisyphus: if rolling a rock up a hill on earth is pointless, then one cannot simply increase its importance by multiplying its causal impact. So doing the same thing not just for one rock, but for billions of rocks across the galaxy, is equally pointless.

Other counterexamples aim to show that, at least in a few cases, a large causal impact is not necessary for importance. For example, it has been argued that if there was sentient life in Alpha Centauri, its intrinsic value would significantly affect the overall importance of Alpha Centauri. This would be the case even if the causal influence of this life on other star systems was negligible. Or on a small scale, a short period of extraordinary suffering before death may significantly affect the overall value of someone's life even if it does not have any wider causal impact.

=== Value impact view ===
Many of the counterexamples raised against the causal impact view suggest that something else besides or instead of the causal influence is central to importance. According to the value impact view, this factor consists of an impact on the intrinsic or final value. In this regard, the relation to value is built into the concept of importance: causal powers only matter instrumentally by bringing about or protecting valuable things. Against the pure causal impact view of importance, it has been argued that having immense causal powers does not entail importance if these powers are not used to make a value difference. So an event is important not because of its sheer causal impact but because of the differences on the evaluative level it brings about. To assess the value impact of something, it is necessary to study not just the thing itself but also its wider and sometimes indirect impact on its surroundings. Many theorists combine both views in their conception of importance: things are important to the extent that they cause value differences. Some theorists, however, defend a pure value impact account by not including causation as a requirement.

A central aspect of the value impact view is how intrinsic or final value is understood. Many theorists in this field have argued for some form of welfarism. On this account, final value consists in the well-being of someone and a thing is important to the extent that it affects someone's well-being. According to Harry Frankfurt, this can be understood in terms of needs: a thing becomes important because some sentient being needs it. In this context, a person needs something if they will be inevitably harmed unless they have it. For example, food and shelter are important to humans because they suffer if they do not have them. Abraham Maslow holds that there is a complex hierarchy of needs. The needs on the higher levels, like esteem and self-actualization, can only be fulfilled once the needs on the lower levels, like food and shelter, are fulfilled. A more general definition includes not just negative impacts on well-being, but also positive ones. So a thing may be important either because it harms someone or because it helps someone or is enjoyed by them. A similar connection between being good and being important is drawn by Ernst Tugendhat. He defines "good" as that which is justifiably preferred. According to him, this can be understood, for the most part, in relation to someone's well-being: a thing is good or justifiably preferable to the extent that it contributes to someone's future well-being. In the case of altruism, for example, an action by one person is good because it aims at improving the well-being of another person.

The value impact of things is often understood counterfactually: based on how much value would be lost or gained if, hypothetically speaking, the thing had not existed. This value includes both the intrinsic and the instrumental value of the thing. In the former case, some things are important because they are good in themselves, like pleasurable experiences. In the latter case, some things are important because they are useful to other things and help them become more valuable, like medicine or school books. The overall degree of importance is then given by the total value difference a thing makes.

=== Context-dependence and relationality ===
Most theorists agree that importance claims are context-dependent. This means that the importance of a thing is relative to a certain domain. For example, preparing for an exam is important in the context of academic success or a revealing slip of the tongue may be important in the context of ruining someone's career. But these events are not important in the context of world history. Other examples are the importance of physical exercise in the context of personal health or the importance of the Scientific Revolution in the context of technological discoveries. The property of importance has a comparative aspect in this regard: something is important in a domain compared to the other objects within this domain. This is justified by the fact that it makes a bigger difference than most of the other things in its domain. Because of this context-dependence, importance may be understood as a relational or extrinsic property: an event may have importance relative to one domain and lack it relative to another domain.

Some researchers also consider the possibility of a form of absolute importance that is not restricted to one specific domain. Things that are important to everything else or the world as a whole may fall into this category. However, various theorists have expressed doubts that anything is significant enough to fall into this category. On the other side of the spectrum, almost anything has importance if a very specific and trivial context is chosen correspondingly.

One heuristic to determine the importance of something relative to a domain is to ask how detailed this thing would be treated by a textbook on the subject. For example, in the context of the general biography of someone, if a full chapter is dedicated to the description of a single event in this person's life then this event is prima facie more important than another event described only in two sentences. Another heuristic is to consider the temporal and spatial dimensions of the event in relation to the size of the domain. For example, one reason why global pandemics, like COVID-19, are more important than local epidemics, like the Western African Ebola virus epidemic, is due to their increased spatial extension.

Another aspect of importance, besides its dependence on a context, is that it is relational. This means that it involves an explicit or implicit comparison with other entities in the corresponding domain. So to say that stoicism is an important school of Hellenistic philosophy implies a comparison to other schools of Hellenistic philosophy, i.e. that it is more noteworthy or influential than an average school of Hellenistic philosophy. This is similar to other gradable adjectives, like "small" or "expensive", which carry an implicit comparison to other entities in the corresponding domain. For example, a baby whale is small in relation to other whales even though it is not small when compared to other forms of sea life. This comparison can be directly linked to the degree of impact that the entity makes. An entity is important within a domain if it makes a bigger impact than most of the other entities belonging to the domain.

== Demarcation from similar terms ==
Importance is a very basic concept and most people have an intuitive familiarity and understanding of it. But it has proven difficult to give a clear and non-circular definition of it. For this reason, many theorists have tried to elucidate the concept by comparing it with various related concepts, such as "meaningfulness", "value", "significance", or "caring". The elucidation happens by pointing out their commonalities and differences. However, such an approach is not unproblematic since these terms are sometimes also used as synonyms.

=== Meaningfulness ===
The terms "importance" and "meaningfulness" are closely related. Especially in discussions of the meaning of life, they are often used in overlapping ways. For example, the desire to lead a meaningful life frequently corresponds to the desire to live an important life. Nonetheless, it has been argued that the two can come apart, i.e. that there are meaningful lives that lack importance and important lives that lack meaning. One motivation for drawing such a distinction is that seeking deeper meaning in life is usually understood as an admirable goal associated with self-transcendence while craving importance is often seen as a less noble and more egocentric undertaking.

There are various accounts of what meaning in life is. Some theorists identify three essential features: life is meaningful if (1) it is guided by purposes that are valuable for their own sake, (2) it transcends mere animal nature by connecting to something larger, and (3) it merits certain attitudes, such as taking pride in it or admiration from others. These criteria can be used to distinguish meaningfulness and importance. For meaningfulness, it is central that the event in question is guided by the agent's purpose and intentions. So in this regard, random events that happen by accident may still have tremendous importance due to their causal consequences, as in the case of unintended butterfly effects. But such events do not make life meaningful. In an example due to Thomas Nagel, the pants of a nobleman accidentally drop the moment he is being knighted. This embarrassment would not make his life meaningful even if it was important by somehow causing a brutal war to end.

Another difference is that some form of higher purpose is necessary for meaningfulness but not for importance. It has also been argued that meaningfulness can be brought about by the mere appreciation of valuable things. This may be the case, for example, by worshipping God. For importance, however, valuable things must be created or defended and not just admired. Another distinction is based on the relation to the quality of life. Finding meaning in life contributes to the quality or final value of that life. Being important, on the other hand, carries with it various instrumental values but need not improve the quality of the life in question. In the ideal case, the two coincide in a life that is both meaningful and important.

But not everyone agrees with the distinction between meaningfulness and importance. Some consequentialists, for example, hold that "a life is meaningful to the extent that it makes the world overall better" without a direct reference to the agent's intentions or a higher purpose.

=== Value ===
Some theorists treat the terms "important" and "valuable" as synonyms. This way of speaking works in various cases but is not generally accepted. Importance is a more complex concept since it depends not just on the value itself but also on the domain of evaluation and on the counterfactual comparison to what would have been the case otherwise. So in this regard, it has been argued that there are cases of valuable activities without importance and maybe even of important activities without value. According to Robert Nozick, the game of chess is an example of value without importance. It has value because of its beautiful and intriguing structures even though it is not important since it does not have a significant impact beyond itself. Chess differs in this aspect from mathematics: both activities have occupied some of the brightest minds but only the insights discovered in mathematical inquiry have had important implications beyond themselves in the form of scientific and technological developments. This distinction is also central to Nozick's thought experiment of the experience machine. This machine is similar to the Matrix in the Matrix movies. It provides a permanent simulated reality and can offer its subjects a life filled with joy and well-being. Such a life is full of value but lacks any wider importance, which is why Nozick recommends against entering this fictional device. Although the two can come apart, ideally they manifest together as a life that has both importance and value.

=== Caring ===
There is an intimate connection between the importance of something and the attitude of caring about this thing. One way to distinguish the two is to see importance as an objective factor in contrast to caring as a subjective attitude. The attitude consists of ascribing importance to something, paying attention to it, and treating it accordingly. A person who cares about something is thus not indifferent to this thing. However, it has been argued that people very often care about things that lack independent or objective importance. For example, a person with the obsessive-compulsive disorder may care a lot about things like not stepping on a crack in the sidewalk even though this is objectively unimportant. A similar issue may concern the importance some people invest in a computer game or their favorite sports team.

Usually, a certain primacy is given to objective importance, which is seen as an independent factor. In this view, the subjective attitude of caring should track this objective factor. Nonetheless, some theorists have argued that this may not always be the case. According to Harry Frankfurt, for example, caring about something makes this thing important to the person. The idea behind this view is that, by starting to care about something, this thing becomes important to the person even if it was unimportant to them before. This can be understood in the sense that the caring attitude causes a need and thereby ties the thing to the person's well-being. A similar view is defended by Matthew Smith, who argues from a third-person perspective that a thing becomes important or morally significant if someone cares about it. This caring attitude by one person then acts as a reason for other people to change their behavior towards this thing accordingly.

Yitzhak Benbaji agrees that this may happen in some cases but denies that it can be generalized. According to him, this type of case contrasts with other cases of things that lack importance to a person independent of the person's conscious attitude towards them. For example, a person might care about their deeply damaged relationship with their spouse. This caring attitude might be based on wrong beliefs about how negatively a split would affect them, meaning that both partners would be better off without it. In this case, the relationship is not important to the person even though they care about it. A similar case involves a person who, following the health advice of a charlatan, starts caring a lot about avoiding a certain type of food. But as it turns out, this food has no health impact whatsoever in this case and is therefore objectively unimportant to the person. This way, it is possible to distinguish caring from importance: a person may care about something even though this thing is unimportant since it has no impact on the person's well-being. The opposite is also possible: something may have an impact on the person's well-being but they may be unaware of this impact and therefore do not care about the thing. This corresponds to the difference between actually needing something and merely believing that one needs it. Ideally, the two coincide: people care about what is important to them.

The relation between caring and importance is also central to Ernst Tugendhat's later philosophy. He holds that there is a natural human tendency to take oneself and one's goals too important, i.e. to care too much about various personal issues that lack the corresponding objective importance. He thinks that a form of spiritual development is necessary to overcome this problem and associates it with mysticism and religion. It consists of a gradual move to a more realistic perspective about one's unimportance in the world as a whole.

=== Others ===
According to Bernard Williams, importance is closely related to so-called deliberative priority but not identical to it. Deliberative priority is a form of practical preference: it determines the weight the agent ascribes to different options in the process of deciding in favor of one of them. This weight depends not just on the value of the different outcomes but also on the agent's ability to affect these outcomes. Finding something important, on the other hand, does not imply that the agent has any power over it. So a traveler may find it important to have good weather during their trip even though this does not carry deliberative priority for them since there is nothing they can do about this fact.

== Types ==
Importance is a broad term with various closely related meanings. For this reason, many theorists try to distinguish different types of importance to clarify what they mean and to avoid misunderstandings. According to Guy Kahane, the distinction between instrumental value and final value found in axiology has its counterpart in the field of importance. So some things are important relative to a specific goal while others are important by contributing to the intrinsic or final value. For example, knowing a certain historic fact may be instrumentally important for someone trying to pass an exam but may lack importance independent of this goal. Other facts, like that Apartheid in South Africa was abolished, are different in the sense that they are important independently of anyone's aims by contributing to the final value of the well-being of many people affected.

Bernard Williams differentiates between two senses of importance: a thing may be important relative to someone or important in an unrestricted sense. The former sense can be expressed by stating that the person finds the thing in question important. For example, it may be of personal importance to a stamp collector to finally acquire the Two-Cent Blue Hawaiian Missionary stamp. The collector finds this goal important but it lacks importance in an unrestricted sense. Besides the restriction to people, importance claims may also be restricted to certain domains. In this sense, a fact may be aesthetically important even though it bears no importance in the domain of morality.

A closely related distinction is drawn by Ernst Tugendhat, who talks of importance relative to someone in contrast to importance in an absolute or objective sense. In the first meaning, importance refers to a subjective attitude as a form of caring. In this regard, that a child is important to their mother means that the mother has a certain attitude towards her child. This attitude usually includes the idea that its target is worthy of love and appreciation. The second meaning refers to an objective sense of having value. This type of importance is not restricted to someone's attitude. It is expressed, for example, when stating that Albert Einstein was objectively important due to his scientific discoveries. This is different from the fact that, presumably, Albert Einstein was also important to his mother.

== Value of importance and desire to be important ==
Many people desire to be important or to make a difference to the world: they want their existence to matter. This desire is usually paired with the requirement that it is realized through intentional actions that express the values one holds dear. In this regard, the desire for importance is closely related to the desire of leading a meaningful life. So to become important by accidentally bumping into something and thereby causing an unintended butterfly effect would not satisfy this desire for most people. Similarly, having important effects, not through actions, but by refraining from actions, usually also does not qualify as fulfilling this desire. So a short drive to the supermarket does not fulfill the agent's desire for importance because they refrained from running over any of the pedestrians they passed on the way.

This issue raises the question of the value of importance, i.e. whether it is good for a person to be important or whether this should be desired. This also has a moral dimension since it determines whether the motivation to become important is morally acceptable or misguided. Becoming important is good at least in the sense that it fulfills the desire of these people. However, the deeper question is whether importance has a value independent of such specific desires. Being important can also have various other side effects. Some of them may be beneficial by helping the person achieve something else they desire, like fame or power. But for others, such side effects may hinder them. For example, a spy may find it very difficult to continue in their discreet line of business if they become well known due to their importance.

Importance is not automatically a good thing. In some cases, it is even obviously a bad thing. For example, the fact that the black death traveled from Asia to Europe was an important event. But, due to its tragic consequences, it was not a good thing to happen. So a central aspect of the value of importance is whether the difference in question is positive or negative. Being important because one discovers a cure for cancer is a valuable form of importance while being important because one causes a global pandemic is a bad form of importance. This is a key difference since some people may be driven by a desire for importance independent of whether it is positive or negative. In this case, they may cause a lot of havoc to the world around them if they are under the impression that they can only achieve importance through a negative impact. For example, someone may "try to become important by assassinating a political leader or cultural figure" without caring about the negative side effects of this act.

On the psychological level, the impression of being important does not always correspond to someone's actual importance. For example, a descendant of a world-historic individual may think themselves important because of this connection even though they have had very little impact on the world.

== Related concepts and theories ==
=== Ethics, morality, and normativity ===
Importance plays various roles in ethics, for example, concerning what reasons we have for an action, how we should act, and what merits attention. Questions of importance play a direct role in morality. According to utilitarians, for example, only the consequences of an action in terms of well-being are important for its moral value. Various Kantians are opposed to this view by holding that all that matters on the moral level is the motivation for the action.

Importance is a normative property. This means that importance claims constitute reasons for actions, emotions, and other attitudes. People are usually justified to give preferential treatment to things that are important to them. So if something is important to someone then it is appropriate for them to care about it: it becomes worthy of the caring attitude. However, caring about something is irrational or inappropriate if the thing lacks importance to the person. For example, it is not important whether a pedestrian steps on the sidewalk cracks or not, which is why caring about this fact is inappropriate. Ideally, the degree of caring should correspond to the importance of the thing: the more important it is, the higher the adequate degree of caring. This has a direct impact on how one behaves towards this thing: what a person cares about is what guides this person's conduct and affects how they live their life. It involves both agency and a rudimentary form of self-consciousness: to care about something is to be invested in it and to identify with the corresponding value.

Closely related to this issue is the role of importance in psychology, specifically in moral psychology. There are innumerous entities in the world together with a vast number of ways of interacting with them at any moment. Considerations of the relative importance of these entities and possible actions help the individual simplify this complexity. This happens by focusing only on the most important factors and deliberating the relative worth of each possible goal when deciding what to do. In the case of rational choice theory, for example, this is realized by making a cost-benefit analysis to determine the significance of each option.

According to Harry Frankfurt, there is a difference between what is important to us and what is morally right. For example, an agent may decide against the course of action demanded by morality since they ascribe more importance to factors outside the moral domain. So people care about many other things besides ethics, such as luxury, friendship, knowledge, and well-being. For example, a job applicant may lie about their qualifications because getting the job is more important to them than their moral obligation to refrain from lying. Nonetheless, there may be some people for whom these two dimensions coincide. This applies to individuals who have made it their highest purpose to lead the best life from an ethical point of view. An example of this might be a utilitarian who is fully committed to maximizing the well-being of everyone in their sphere of influence and gives precedence to this goal over all other goals.

=== Cosmic importance of human life ===
In the context of the meaning of life, theorists often discuss the question of whether human life has significance on a cosmic scale. Something has cosmic importance if it is important in the widest domain, i.e. important in relation to everything else out there or important all things considered. This is intimately related to the idea that some things have absolute importance or importance independent of a context.

Raising the question of the cosmic importance of human life is frequently motivated by the perspective of the universe as a whole as described by modern science. This perspective seems to suggest a negative response: that human life lacks a higher meaning or significance. In this regard, it is often argued that, from this perspective, the Earth and all life on it are a mere "speck of dust in a vast universe" and "without significance, import or purpose beyond our planet". Whether this outlook is correct may depend on how the concept of "importance" is understood. If "important" means "having a causal impact on a large scale" then human life seems to be cosmically unimportant. Such a view is held by David Benatar, who defends this claim by arguing that "[n]othing we do on Earth has any effect beyond it". A similar pessimistic outlook may be motivated by comparing the spatial and temporal dimensions of human life with those of the universe as a whole.

However, various theorists have opposed this pessimistic view. Their arguments usually focus on the unique qualities of human life. In this regard, Earth is the only place with sentient life we know of. And humanity seems to have an even more special place due to its highly developed mind. Guy Kahane calls this the solitary significance argument. It states that terrestrial life has cosmic significance because it is the only thing in the universe with intrinsic value and thus makes a value difference to the universe. This argument can be extended specifically to human life by arguing that among the sentient beings, humans have the greatest value and have, therefore, a special form of cosmic significance. The other side of this argument is that the existence of other intelligent lifeforms would threaten our cosmic significance. And while the human species as a whole may have cosmic significance, it also seems to follow from the argument that most individual humans lack cosmic significance, given the sheer number of humans in existence. However, there may be some exceptions to this rule for individuals with a special world-historic impact, like Buddha or Mandela on the positive side, or Hitler and Stalin on the negative side. Nonetheless, the lack of cosmic importance of most people does not entail that they lack any importance whatsoever: they usually make some form of value difference in their own domain. This difference is just tiny compared to the cosmic scale.

=== Nihilism, absurdism, and existential crisis ===
A negative response to the question of the cosmic importance of human life may lead to a form of nihilism or absurdism. On the moral or ethical level, nihilism can be expressed as the view that nothing really matters or that nothing has any importance. This view is closely related to absurdism. Absurdists accept this basic outlook and use it to argue for the thesis that life, or the world as a whole, is absurd. That means that there is a conflict between the internal human desire for things to matter that is frustrated by the external lack of significance belonging to the nature of the world. Accepting the absurdist or nihilist perspective on the world may trigger an existential crisis. An existential crisis is an inner conflict in which the perceived lack of any importance causes various negative experiences, such as stress, anxiety, despair, and depression, which can disturb the individual's normal functioning in everyday life. Usually, nihilism, absurdism, and existential crises are defined, not in terms of importance, but in terms of meaning: they are concerned with the impression that life is meaningless. However, many theorists hold that this also implies a lack of importance and a few theorists even define these phenomena in terms of a lack of importance or significance.

=== Power, wealth, and fame ===
People often ascribe high importance to power, material wealth, and fame. Power may be defined as the ability to affect outcomes or to carry out one's own will despite resistance. These causal effects establish an intimate relation to importance, especially if importance is defined in terms of having a big causal impact. Wealth, and the luxury that comes with it, is usually treated as an indication that a person is important. According to Nozick, there is a central distinction between wealth and power, on the one hand, and importance, on the other hand. For example, power by itself does not lead to importance if it is not used at all or not used in a fruitful way. And the same is true for wealth and money: they can be used to affect important changes but they can also be wasted without any lasting effect. In this regard, the successful pursuit of money alone does not guarantee that one leads an important life. And the same is true for power: it depends on how it is exercised, just having it is not sufficient.

Many people desire to be famous. Fame and importance are closely associated with each other: famous people are usually important and important people are usually famous. However, the meanings of these terms are not identical. The fame of a person depends on various factors. These include how many people know about this person, how much they know about them, and how positively they evaluate them. This evaluative aspect can be used to distinguish famous persons from celebrities: celebrities are well known in their domain but this does not imply that they are seen in a positive light or have a good reputation. People may become famous because they do important things. The attention they get due to being famous may, in turn, help them do further important things. But the two can come apart nonetheless: not everyone who makes an important difference becomes famous and not all famous people make important differences. It has been argued that importance is in some sense more basic and that fame depends on it: "fame is what importance merits". So ideally, the more important someone is the more famous they should be. Power is often closely related to fame or how other people perceive and react to the individual since many types of power arise from people responding to the powerful individual, for example, by following their command.
