= On Bullshit =

Philosophical essay by Harry Frankfurt

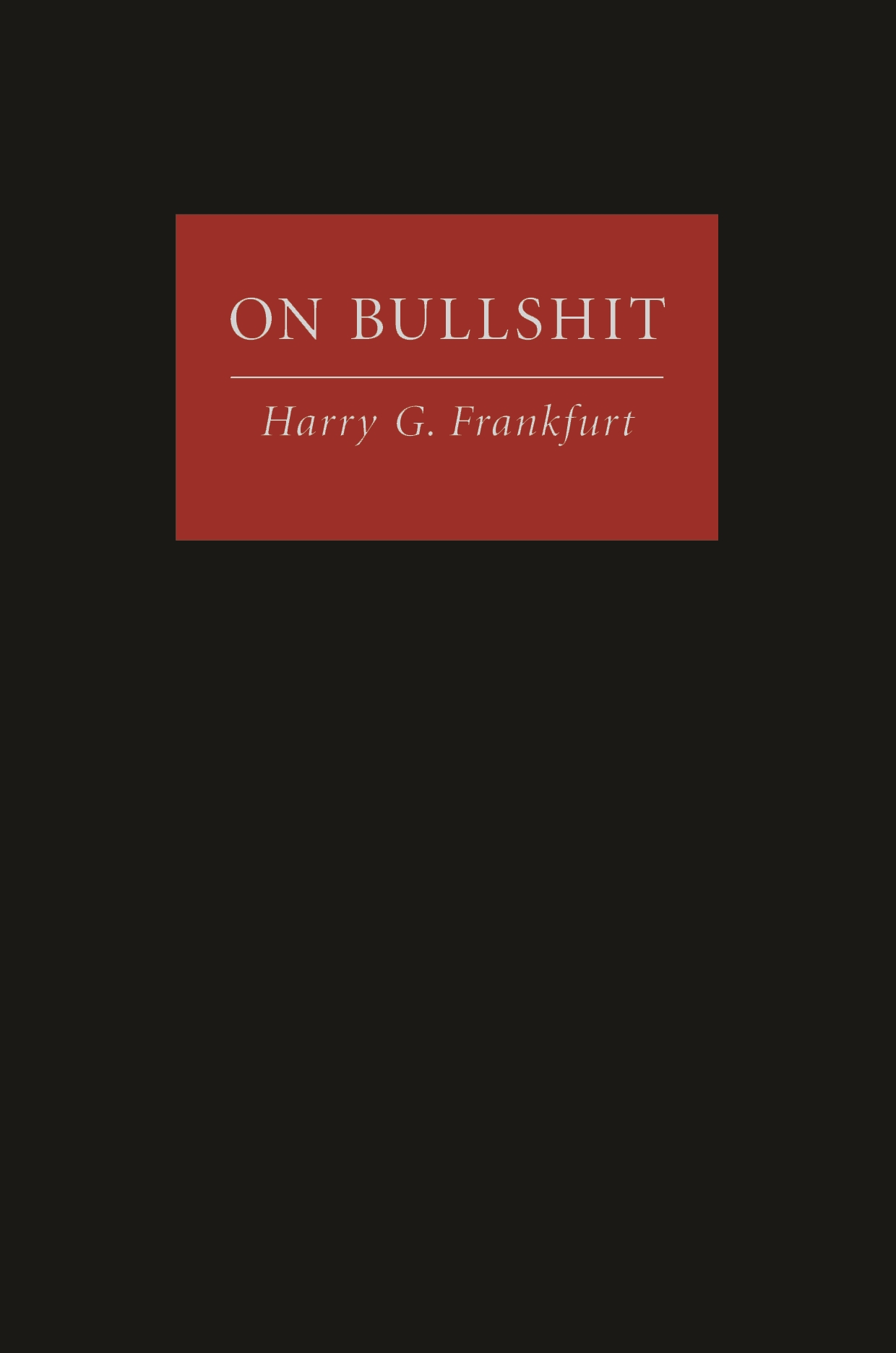
- Author: Harry Frankfurt
- Language: English
- Genre: Philosophy
- Publisher: Princeton University Press
- Publication date: 2005
- Media type: Print
- Pages: 80
- ISBN: 978-0691122946

On Bullshit is a 1986 essay, published as a book in 2005, by the American philosopher Harry G. Frankfurt which presents a theory of bullshit that defines the concept and analyzes the applications of bullshit in the context of communication. Frankfurt determines that bullshit is speech intended to persuade without regard for truth. The liar cares about the truth and attempts to hide it; the bullshitter doesn't care whether what they say is true or false. Frankfurt's philosophical analysis of bullshit has been analyzed, criticized and adopted by academics since its publication.

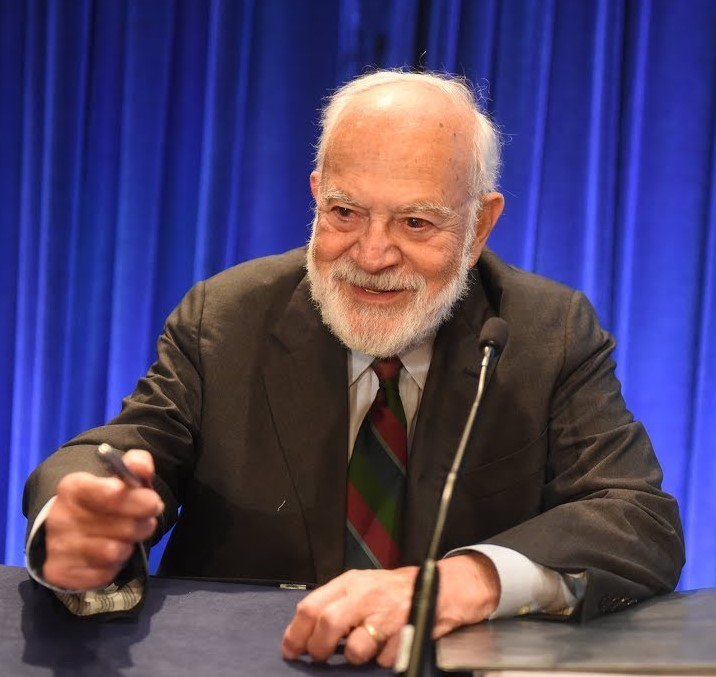
Harry G. Frankfurt

== History ==
Frankfurt originally published the essay "On Bullshit" in the Raritan Quarterly Review in 1986. Nineteen years later, it was published as the book On Bullshit (2005), which proved popular among lay readers; the book appeared for 27 weeks on The New York Times Best Seller list and was discussed on the television show The Daily Show with Jon Stewart, and in an online interview. On Bullshit served as the basis for Frankfurt's follow-up book On Truth (2006).

== Summary ==
Frankfurt was a professional philosopher, trained in analytical philosophy. When asked why he decided to focus on bullshit, he explained:

Respect for the truth and a concern for the truth are among the foundations for civilization. I was for a long time disturbed by the lack of respect for the truth that I observed ... bullshit is one of the deformities of these values.

On Bullshit addresses his concern and makes a distinction between "bullshitters" and liars. He concludes that bullshitters are more insidious: they are more so a threat against the truth than are liars who, like truth-tellers, are resolutely concerned with the truth, the latter in telling it, the former in avoiding it, unlike bullshitters, who are almost entirely unconcerned with the truth.

=== Humbug and bullshit ===
Frankfurt begins his work on bullshit by presenting an explanation and examination of Max Black's concept of humbug. Black's essay on humbug and Frankfurt's book on bullshit are similar. Both focus on understanding, defining and explaining their respective concepts and using examples. Frankfurt focuses on humbug, as he believes that it is similar to bullshit but is the more respectful term. Frankfurt uses Black's work on humbug to break down the description of humbug into defining factors: "deceptive misrepresentation", "short of lying", "misrepresentation ... of somebody's own thoughts, feelings, or attitudes", and "especially by pretentious word or deed". Frankfurt's analysis enables him to distinguish between humbug and lying. The main distinction is the intent that motivates them. The intent behind humbug is misrepresentation, whereas the intent behind lying is more extreme, intending to cover the truth. To Frankfurt, people tend to bullshit due to another motive that could hide something. The comparison of humbug to lying acts as an initial introduction to bullshit. Humbug is closely related to bullshit, but Frankfurt believes that it is inadequate to explain bullshit and its characteristics.

=== Lying and bullshit ===
Frankfurt's book focuses heavily on defining and discussing the difference between lying and bullshit. The main difference between the two is intent and deception. Both people who are lying and people who are telling the truth are focused on the truth. The liar wants to steer people away from discovering the truth, and the person telling the truth wants to present the truth. Bullshitters differ from both liars and people presenting the truth with their disregard of the truth. Frankfurt explains that bullshitters are distinct from liars, as they are not focused on the truth. Persons who communicate bullshit are not interested in whether what they say is true or false, only in its suitability for their purpose. In his book, Frankfurt defines "shit", "bull session" and "bull". This is done in a lexicographical manner which breaks down the word bullshit and examines each component. The components of the word bullshit highlights the corresponding terms that encompass the overall meaning of the word bullshit: useless, insignificant and nonsense.

Next, Frankfurt focuses on the complete word and its implications and acceptance. He presents an example of advice provided to a child from his father which encourages choosing bullshit over lying when possible. Frankfurt gives two reasons for the different levels of consequences between bullshit and lying. First, the liar is viewed as being purposefully deceitful or harmful because of the accompanying intent behind the act. Second, the person who bullshits lacks the kind of intention characteristic of the liar. Producing bullshit requires no knowledge of the truth. The liar is intentionally avoiding the truth, while the bullshitter may be telling the truth or providing elements of the truth without the specific intention to do so. Frankfurt believes that bullshitters and the growing acceptance of bullshit are more harmful to society than liars and lying. This is because liars actively consider the truth when they conceal it, whereas bullshitters completely disregard the truth. "Bullshit is a greater enemy of the truth than lies are." Frankfurt believes that, while bullshit may be tolerated more, it is much more harmful.

=== Rise of bullshit ===
Frankfurt concludes his book by discussing the rise of bullshit. He does not argue that there is more bullshit in society than there was in the past. He explains that all forms of communication have increased, leading to more bullshit being seen, read and heard. He states that the social expectation for individuals to have and express their opinions on all matters requires more bullshit. Despite a lack of knowledge on a subject matter, for example, politics, religion or art, there is an expectation to participate in the conversation and provide an opinion. This opinion is likely to be bullshit at times, as it is not based on fact and research. The opinion is motivated by a disregard of the truth with a desire to appear knowledgeable or adequately opinionated. Frankfurt acknowledges that bullshitting may not always be intentional but believes that ultimately it is performed with a disregard and carelessness of the truth. Frankfurt argues that this rise in bullshit in communications is dangerous, as it accepts and enables a growing disregard of the truth.

== Reception and criticisms ==
The responses to Frankfurt's work have varied greatly. Since the publication, it has been discussed, adapted, praised and criticized. It has received a positive reception by many academics, is considered remarkable by some, and its popularity amongst the public is evident with its status as a best seller for many weeks.

His work has also received criticisms. One of the main criticisms has been that the work is overly simplistic and too narrow: that the book does not acknowledge the many dynamic factors involved in communication, or the dynamic nature of truth. This criticism also explains that the work is limited in its analysis of other motives and forms of bullshit aside from one stemming from a lack of concern for the truth. One critic notes that the book does not mention, or dismisses, the audience's ability to detect bullshit, and that Frankfurt's explanation of bullshit presents a narrative where bullshit goes unnoticed or is easily excusable by its audience. Another critic points to the book's failure to rewrite the original essay to include an acknowledgement or discussion of criticism and accounting for any of the new developments and ideas within psychology and philosophy for the publication of his book.

Some researchers believe that Frankfurt's concept suitably describes the behavior of large language model-based chatbots and is more accurate than terms like "hallucination" or "confabulation". The uncritical use of LLM output is sometimes called botshit.

== See also ==
- Truthiness
- Post-truth politics
- Brandolini's law
- Rhetoric
- "On the Decay of the Art of Lying"
- Bullshit Jobs: A Theory

== Bibliography ==
- "On Bullshit". Raritan Quarterly Review. 6 (2): 81–100. Fall 1986.
- "On Bullshit". The Importance of What We Care About: Philosophical Essays. Cambridge: Cambridge University Press. 1988. pp. 117–133. doi:10.1017/CBO9780511818172.011. ISBN 0521333245. (hardback), ISBN 0521336112 (paperback).
- On Bullshit. Princeton, NJ: Princeton University Press. 2005. ISBN 978-0691122946.
