= Peter van Inwagen =

American philosopher (born 1942)

- Born: September 21, 1942 (age 84); Rochester, New York, U.S.

Academic background
- Education: Rensselaer Polytechnic Institute (BS); University of Rochester (PhD)
- Thesis: An Essay of the Freedom of the Will (1969)
- Doctoral advisor: Richard Clyde Taylor

Academic work
- Era: Contemporary philosophy
- Region: Western philosophy
- School or tradition: Analytic philosophy
- Institutions: University of Notre Dame; Duke University
- Main interests: Metaphysics; Philosophy of religion Philosophy of action
- Notable ideas: Special composition question Incompatibilism; Consequence argument Meta-ontology; Mind argument

Peter Jan van Inwagen (/væn ɪnˈwɑːɡən/ van in-WAH-ghən; born September 21, 1942) is an American philosopher. He is the John Cardinal O'Hara Professor of Philosophy at the University of Notre Dame and a research professor of philosophy at Duke University each spring. He previously taught at Syracuse University, earning his PhD from the University of Rochester in 1969 under the direction of Richard Clyde Taylor. Van Inwagen is one of the leading figures in contemporary metaphysics, philosophy of religion, and philosophy of action. He was the president of the Society of Christian Philosophers from 2010 to 2013.

== Early life and education ==
Van Inwagen was born on September 21, 1942, in Rochester, New York. His father was a lapsed Roman Catholic and his mother rarely attended church. Three of his grandparents were non-practicing Protestants, while his paternal grandmother was a devout Roman Catholic.

At the age of seven, van Inwagen was briefly enrolled by his parents in a Presbyterian Sunday school, where he received instruction in Christian beliefs. His family later joined a Unitarian congregation. By the time he entered university, van Inwagen had abandoned his attachment to Unitarianism and become an agnostic.

Van Inwagen graduated from Rensselaer Polytechnic Institute in Troy, New York, with a Bachelor of Science degree in 1965. He then earned his Ph.D. in philosophy from the University of Rochester in 1969. His doctoral dissertation was titled, An Essay on the Freedom of the Will. His doctoral studies were under the supervision of philosopher Richard Clyde Taylor.

== Career ==
Van Inwagen's 1983 monograph An Essay on Free Will played an important role in rehabilitating libertarianism with respect to free will in mainstream analytical philosophy. In the book, he introduces the term incompatibilism about free will and determinism, to stand in contrast to compatibilism—the view that free will is compatible with determinism.

Van Inwagen's central argument (the consequence argument) for this view is that "If determinism is true, then our acts are the consequences of the laws of nature and events in the remote past. But it is not up to us what went on before we were born, and neither is it up to us what the laws of nature are. Therefore, the consequences of those things (including our present acts) are not up to us."

Van Inwagen also added what he called the Mind Argument (after the philosophical journal Mind, where such arguments often appeared). "The Mind argument proceeds by identifying indeterminism with chance and by arguing that an act that occurs by chance, if an event that occurs by chance can be called an act, cannot be under the control of its alleged agent and hence cannot have been performed freely. Proponents of [this argument] conclude, therefore, that free will is not only compatible with determinism but entails determinism."

The Consequence Argument and the Mind Argument are the two horns in the classic dilemma and standard argument against free will. If determinism is true, our actions are not free. If indeterminism is true, our actions are influenced by randomness and our will cannot be morally responsible for them.

Van Inwagen concludes, "Free Will Remains a Mystery." In an article written in the third person called "Van Inwagen on Free Will", he describes the problem with his incompatibilist free will if random chance directly causes our actions. He imagines the universe reverting a thousand times to exactly the same circumstances it was in at some earlier time and observing all the "replays". If the agent's actions are random, she sometimes "would have agent-caused the crucial brain event and sometimes (in seventy percent of the replays, let us say) she would not have [...] I conclude that even if an episode of agent causation is among the causal antecedents of every voluntary human action, these episodes do nothing to undermine the prima facie impossibility of an undetermined free act."

In Material Beings, Van Inwagen argues that all material objects are either elementary particles or living organisms. Every composite material object is made up of elementary particles, and the only such composite objects are living organisms. A consequence of this view is that everyday objects such as tables, chairs, cars, buildings, and clouds do not exist. While there seem to be such things, this is only because there are elementary particles arranged in specific ways. For example, where it seems that there is a chair, Van Inwagen says that there are only elementary particles arranged chairwise. These particles do not compose an object, any more than a swarm of bees composes an object. Like a swarm of bees, the particles we call a chair maintain a more or less stable arrangement for a while, which gives the impression of a single object. An individual bee, by contrast, has parts that are unified in the right way to constitute a single object (namely, a bee).

Van Inwagen gave the 2003 Gifford Lectures; they are published in his The Problem of Evil. There he argues that the problem of evil is a philosophical argument and, like most philosophical arguments, fails.

Van Inwagen has shown an interest in the afterlife debate, particularly in relation to resurrection of the body. In his article "I Look for the Resurrection of the Dead and the Life of the World to Come", he concludes that Christians must account for some sort of physical continuity in their account of existence of the same person after death. In particular, Van Inwagen notes, this is a problem for the Christian materialist, one who believes that human beings are physical substances.

== Awards and honors ==
Van Inwagen was elected to the American Academy of Arts and Sciences in 2005, and was President of the Central Division of the American Philosophical Association in 2008/09. He was the president of the Society of Christian Philosophers from 2010 to 2013.

He has delivered lectures including:

- The F. D. Maurice Lectures, three lectures delivered at the University of London in March 1999
- The Wilde Lectures on Natural Religion, eight lectures delivered at Oxford University in Trinity Term, 2000
- The Stewart Lectures: three lectures delivered at Princeton University, October 2002
- The Gifford Lectures, eight lectures delivered at the University of St. Andrews, May 2003
- The Jellema Lectures: two lectures delivered at Calvin College, March 2004
- The Münster Lectures in Philosophy, including a student colloquium at the University of Münster, November 2015

In May 2011, he received an honorary doctorate from the University of St Andrews, Scotland.

== Personal life ==
Van Inwagen lives in Granger, Indiana, with his wife, Elisabeth. He converted to Christianity in 1980. In May 1983, he was baptized an Episcopalian and received his First Communion.

== Books ==
- Van Inwagen, Peter; Lane Craig, William (2024). Do Numbers Exist?. doi:10.4324/9781003008712. ISBN 978-1-003-00871-2..
- Thinking about Free Will. Cambridge: Cambridge University Press. 2017. ISBN 978-1-107-16650-9.
- Existence: Essays in Ontology. Cambridge: Cambridge University Press. 2014. ISBN 978-1-107-62526-6.
- The Problem of Evil. Oxford: Oxford University Press. 2006. ISBN 978-0-19-924560-4.
- Ontology, Identity, and Modality: Essays in Metaphysics. Cambridge: Cambridge University Press. 2002. ISBN 978-0-521-79164-9.
- The Possibility of Resurrection and Other Essays in Christian Apologetics. Boulder, CO: Westview Press. 1998. ISBN 978-0-8133-2731-0.
- God, Knowledge and Mystery: Essays in Philosophical Theology. Ithaca: Cornell University Press. 1995. ISBN 978-0-8014-8186-4.
- Metaphysics. Boulder, CO: Westview Press. 2002. ISBN 978-0-8133-9055-0.
- Material Beings. Ithaca: Cornell University Press. 1990. ISBN 978-0-8014-8306-6.
- An Essay on Free Will. Oxford: Oxford University Press. 1983. ISBN 978-0-19-824924-5.

== See also ==
- American philosophy
- List of American philosophers
- Mereological nihilism

== Works cited ==
- Kane, Robert (2005). A Contemporary Introduction to Free Will. Oxford University Press. ISBN 978-0-19-514970-8.
- van Inwagen, Peter (1983). An Essay on Free Will. Oxford: Oxford University Press. ISBN 978-0-19-824924-5.
- van Inwagen, Peter (2000). "Free Will Remains a Mystery: The Eighth Philosophical Perspectives Lecture Free Will Remains a Mystery: The Eighth Philosophical Perspectives Lecture". Philosophical Perspectives. 14. Ridgeview Publishing Company.
- van Inwagen, Peter (2004). Campbell, Joseph Keim; O'Rourke, Michael; Shier, David (eds.). Freedom and Determinism. MIT Press. pp. 213–230. ISBN 978-0-262-53257-0.
- van Inwagen, Peter (2017). Thinking about Free Will. Cambridge University Press. ISBN 978-1-107-16650-9.
- Zimmerman, Dean (2009). Sosa, Ernest; Rosenkrantz, Gary; Kim, Jaegwon (eds.). A Companion to Metaphysics (2nd ed.). Malden, Massachusetts: Blackwell. pp. 619–621.
