= Akrasia =

Lack of self-control

Akrasia (Note: /əˈkreɪʒə, -zi-/, ə-KRAY-zhə, -zee-; from Ancient Greek ἀκρασία, literally "lack of self-control" or "powerlessness," derived from ἀ- "without" + κράτος "power, rule") refers to the phenomenon of acting against one's better judgment—the state in which one intentionally performs an action while simultaneously believing that a different course of action would be better. Sometimes translated as "weakness of will" or "incontinence," akrasia describes the paradoxical human experience of knowingly choosing what one judges to be the inferior option.

The concept of akrasia raises philosophical questions regarding the connection between reason, desire, and action by challenging the intuitive assumption that rational judgment governs an agent's behavior. For example, there can be an instance of akrasia when (i) an agent is aware of what they should do (ii) they choose to do something else, and (iii) it is appropriate to say that the agent does this other thing because of some impulse or emotion.

== History ==
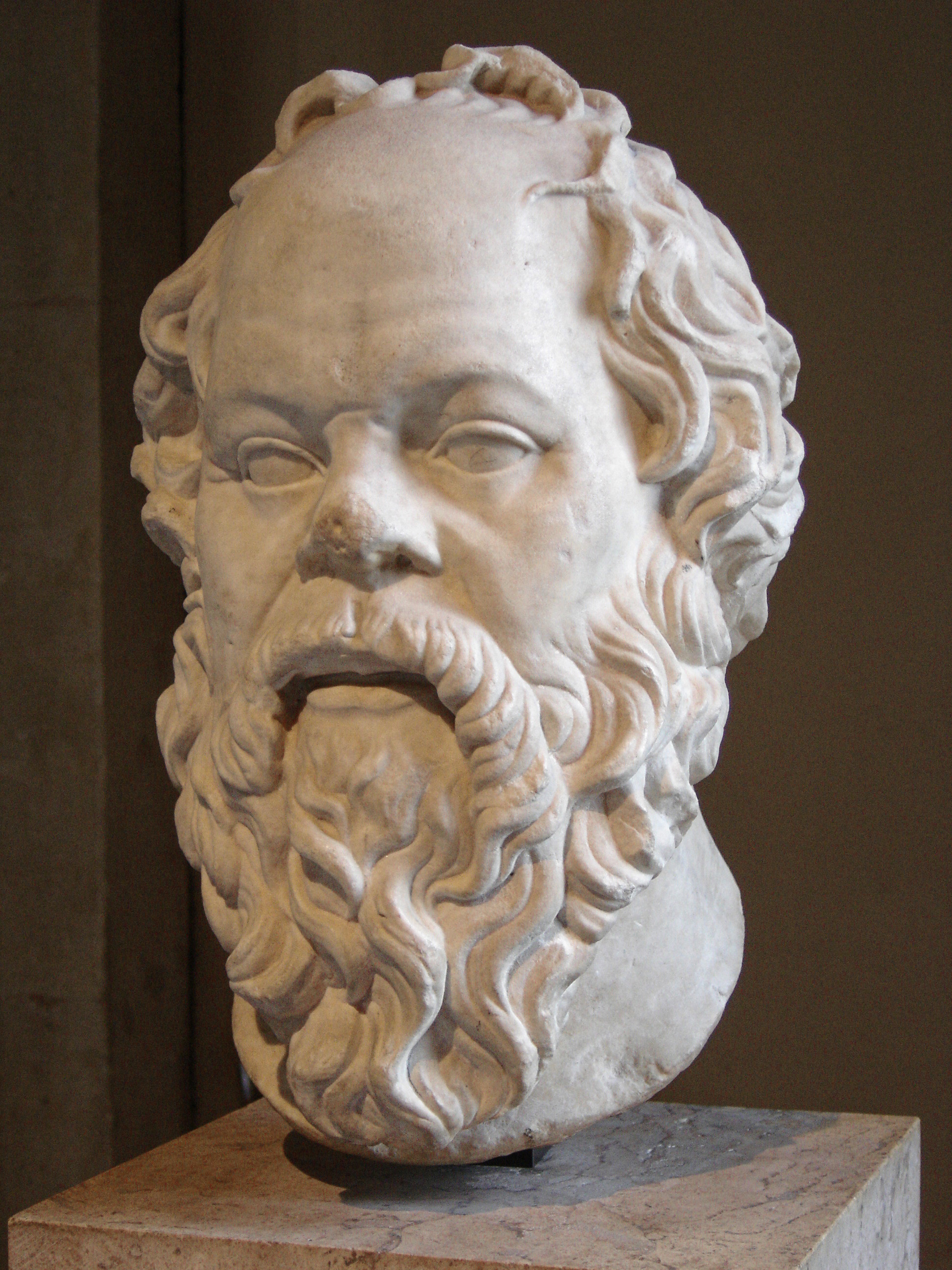
Portrait in marble of Socrates. In the Protagoras, Plato has Socrates examine the concept of akrasia.

In Plato's Protagoras dialogue, Socrates asks precisely how it is possible that, if one judges action A to be the best course of action, why one would do anything other than A. Plato held the idea that training in the sciences and metaphysics were a necessary prerequisite for a full understanding of an agent's good.

According to Stadford's Plato:

[Aristotle] rejects Plato's idea that a training in the sciences and metaphysics are a necessary prerequisite for a full understanding of our good. What we need, in order to live well, is a proper appreciation of the way in which such goods as friendship, pleasure, virtue, honor and wealth fit together as a whole. In order to apply that general understanding to particular cases, we must acquire, through proper upbringing and habits, the ability to see, on each occasion, which course of action is best supported by reasons.

For example, if a subject believes that studying for their upcoming exam is their best course of action but chooses to go on their phone instead, questions are raised regarding how that subject can knowingly act against what they believe is best for them. Such a lapse suggests that, as Socrates questioned, the subject's 'knowledge' of the best path may be less a firm conviction and more a failure of the proper appreciation required to resist immediate distraction.

=== Classical answers ===
In Plato's Protagoras, Socrates presents a radical thesis that fundamentally denies the existence of akrasia. His famous declaration, "No one goes willingly toward the bad or what he believes to be bad; neither is it human nature, so it seems, to want to go toward what one believes to be bad instead of to the good. And when he is forced to choose between one of two bad things, no one will choose the greater if he is able to choose the lesser." (οὐδεὶς ἑκὼν κακός), encapsulates a view known as Socratic intellectualism. On this, Roslyn Weiss seems correct about ἑκὼν/hekōn in that statement.

"How one chooses to render hekōn... when it appears in the Socratic paradox tends to reflect how one understands the paradox. Some translate 'deliverately' or 'intentionally,' Those who use 'willingly' or 'voluntarily' may be suggesting that Plato's Socrates is metaphysically committed to something called a 'will.'"

According to Socrates, genuine akrasia is impossible because human action necessarily follows knowledge. His argument proceeds through several interconnected premises:

1. The unity of knowledge and virtue: Socrates maintains that virtue is knowledge. Specifically, virtue is knowledge of what is truly good and beneficial. To know the good is necessarily to pursue it, as knowledge compels action. On this account, one's wrongdoing does not arise from intentional malevolence, but rather through their ignorance about what is truly good.
2. The natural orientation toward the good: Human beings, by their very nature, seek what they perceive to be good for themselves. No rational agent deliberately chooses what they genuinely believe to be harmful or inferior to available alternatives. Then, it seems as though when a subject willingly partakes in x action which presents more problems than another action y, their choice is explained as a mistake in judgment about what would truly benefit oneself.
3. The power of complete knowledge: When one conducts a thorough, all-things-considered evaluation of a situation, this assessment yields complete knowledge of each potential action's outcomes and relative worth. This knowledge is inextricably linked to well-developed principles of the good.

Given the above premises, Socrates concludes that it is psychologically impossible for someone who truly knows what is best to act otherwise. The person who possesses genuine knowledge of the good will inevitably pursue it, as this pursuit aligns with both human nature and rational necessity.

Therefore, in the Socratic framework, what appears to be akrasia—acting against one's better judgment—is actually a form of ignorance. Actions that seem to contradict what is objectively best must result from incomplete knowledge of the facts, inadequate understanding of what constitutes the genuine good, or failure to properly calculate the consequences of one's actions. On his view, we would consider moral failure as intellectual rather than the defect of an agent's character or willpower. Denying akrasia allows Socrates to preserve a connection between virtue and rationality, but puts him at conflict with common human experience.

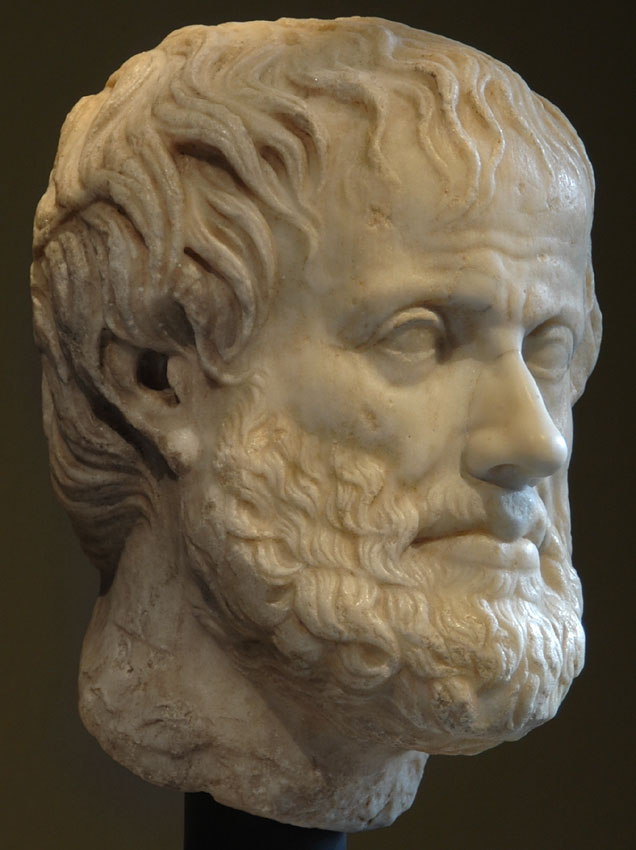
Marble portrait of Aristotle. In his work, Nicomachean Ethics, Aristotle approached Akrasia with skepticism, developing a systematic account of the phenomenon as internal conflicts of reason and desire.

Aristotle recognizes that the possibility of acting contrary to one's best judgment is a staple of commonsense and a common human experience. Aristotle dedicates Book VII of the Nicomachean Ethics to an examination of akrasia, adopting a distinctly empirical approach that contrasts sharply with Socratic intellectualism. He distanced himself from the Socratic position by distinguishing different mental faculties and their roles in action. Though akrasia is often pictured as a particular psychological process or event, Aristotle is most interested in akrasia as a persistent state of the soul. He argues that akrasia results from one's opinion (δόξα, doxa), not one's desire (epithumia) per se. The crucial difference here is that while desire is a natural condition of the body incapable of truth or falsity, opinion is a belief that may or may not be true, a cognitive state. Therefore, akratic failures can be explained by the incorrectness of one's best judgment rather than a failure to attempt to act according to one's best judgment. For Aristotle, akrasia is different from vice; an akratic person is very much like a virtuous person in what he thinks he should do. Further, the akratic person differs from the virtuous person if and only if the agent has desires to do things that he thinks he should do, and/or if the agent fails to control these desires. When an agent's best judgment is a false belief, it does not have the power to compel one that Socrates attributed to knowledge of what is genuinely best. By following this approach, Aristotle is able to preserve akrasia while tackling rational evaluation. Further, he successfully avoids the epistemic problem faced by Socrates.

For Aristotle, the opposite of akrasia is enkrateia, a state where an agent has power over their desires. Aristotle considered one could be in a state of akrasia with respect to money or temper or glory, but that its core relation was to bodily enjoyment. Its causes could be weakness of will, or an impetuous refusal to think. At the same time he did not consider it a vice because it is not so much a product of moral choice as a failure to act on one's better knowledge. Aristotle believed that Socrates placed too much emphasis on defending the view that "knowledge cannot be overpowered": that we never act against what we in any way take or recognize to be what we should do (Nicomachean Ethics 1145b23-27). Though he didn't completely reject Socrates' solution, he disagreed with the way Socrates framed the problem. In Aristotle's view, the problem of akrasia is to describe a condition in which a person acts irrationally, and does what an emotion provokes rather than what his reason leads him to, but where the emotion doesn't overpower his reason, and neither does his reason accede to the emotion (Nicomachean Ethics 1151a20-24).

Aristotle distinguishes two kinds of akrasia:

1. weakness (astheneia): A weak-willed agent knows what they should do after thinking it through, yet fails to act according to that choice, yielding instead to affective influence (pathos).
2. impetuosity (propeteia): The impetuous individual bypasses deliberation entirely, and acts solely under the influence of their emotions (pathos). This is because they experience no internal opposition during the act, and conflict only arises as post-hoc regret. Then, their reasoning process is essentially retroactive, and only serves to identify an error after the fact.

For Augustine of Hippo, incontinence was not so much a problem of knowledge but of the will; he considered it a matter of everyday experience that men incontinently choose lesser over greater goods.

=== Contemporary approaches ===
Donald Davidson attempted to answer the question by first criticizing earlier thinkers who wanted to limit the scope of akrasia to agents who despite having reached a rational decision were somehow swerved off their "desired" tracks. Indeed, Davidson expands akrasia to include any judgment that is reached but not fulfilled, whether it be as a result of an opinion, a real or imagined good, or a moral belief. "[T]he puzzle I shall discuss depends only on the attitude or belief of the agent...my subject concerns evaluative judgments, whether they are analyzed cognitively, prescriptively, or otherwise." Thus, he expands akrasia to include cases in which the agent seeks to fulfill desires, for example, but end up denying themselves the pleasure they have deemed most choice-worthy.

Davidson sees the problem as one of reconciling the following apparently inconsistent triad:

- If an agent believes A to be better than B, then they want to do A more than B.
- If an agent wants to do A more than B, then they will do A rather than B if they only do one.
- Sometimes an agent acts against their better judgment.

Davidson solves the problem by saying that, when people act in this way they temporarily believe that the worse course of action is better because they have not made an all-things-considered judgment but only a judgment based on a subset of possible considerations. If one supported Davidson's approach, they would be able to avoid conflicts regarding rational agency.

Another contemporary philosopher, Amélie Rorty, has tackled the problem by distilling out akrasia's many forms. Rather than treating weakness of will as a single phenomenon, she argued that akrasia can be manifested in different stages of the practical reasoning process. She enumerates four types of akrasia: akrasia of direction or aim, of interpretation, of irrationality, and of character. All four correspond to various stages in one's process of reasoning: how one sets their goals, how they interpret situations under different circumstances, how they choose an action, and how the subject shapes their habits (character). She separates the practical reasoning process into four steps, showing the breakdown that may occur between each step and how each constitutes an akratic state.

Another explanation is that there are different forms of motivation that can conflict with each other. Throughout the ages, many have identified a conflict between reason and emotion, which might make it possible to believe that one should do A rather than B, but still end up wanting to do B more than A.

Psychologist George Ainslie argues that akrasia results from the empirically verified phenomenon of hyperbolic discounting, which causes us to make different judgments close to a reward than we will when further from it.

==== Weakness of will ====
Richard Holton argues that weakness of the will involves revising one's resolutions too easily. Under this view, it is possible to act against one's better judgment (that is, be akratic) without being weak-willed. Suppose, for example, Sarah judges that taking revenge upon a murderer is not the best course of action but makes the resolution to take revenge anyway and sticks to that resolution. According to Holton, Sarah behaves akratically but does not show weakness of will.

== Legacy ==
In the structural division of Dante's Inferno, incontinence is the sin punished in the second through fifth circles. The mutual incontinence of lust was for Dante the lightest of the deadly sins, even if its lack of self-control would open the road to deeper layers of Hell.

Akrasia appeared later as a character in Spenser's The Faerie Queene, representing the incontinence of lust, followed in the next canto by a study of that of anger; and as late as Jane Austen the sensibility of such figures as Marianne Dashwood would be treated as a form of (spiritual) incontinence.

But with the triumph of Romanticism, the incontinent choice of feeling over reason became increasingly valorised in Western culture. Blake wrote, "those who restrain desire, do so because theirs is weak enough to be restrained". Encouraged by Rousseau, there was a rise of what Arnold J. Toynbee called "an abandon (ακρατεια)...a state of mind in which antinomianism is accepted—consciously or unconsciously, in theory or in practice—as a substitute for creativeness".

== See also ==
- Aboulia – Neurological symptom of lack of will or initiative
- Acedia – Mental state
- Categorical imperative – Central concept in Kantian moral philosophy
- Cognitive dissonance – Mental phenomenon of holding contradictory beliefs
- Disorders of diminished motivation – Group of psychiatric and neurological conditions
- Ego depletion – Psychological theory
- Executive functions – Cognitive processes necessary for control of behavior
- Marshmallow test – 1970 study on delayed gratification
- Higher-order volition – Philosophical term
- Procrastination – Avoiding doing a task that needs to be completed
- Self control – Aspect of inhibitory control
- Velleity – Lowest degree of volition
