= Determinism =

Belief that events are determined by prior ones

Determinism is the metaphysical view that all events within the universe can occur only in one possible way. Deterministic theories throughout the history of philosophy have developed from diverse and sometimes overlapping motives and considerations. Like eternalism, determinism focuses on particular events rather than the future as a concept. Determinism is often contrasted with free will, although some philosophers argue that the two are compatible. The antonym of determinism is indeterminism, the view that events are not deterministically caused.

Historically, debates about determinism have involved many philosophical positions and given rise to multiple varieties or interpretations of determinism. One topic of debate concerns the scope of determined systems. Some philosophers have maintained that the entire universe is a single determinate system, while others identify more limited determinate systems. Another common debate topic is whether determinism and free will can coexist; compatibilism and incompatibilism represent the opposing sides of this debate.

Determinism should not be confused with the self-determination of human actions by reasons, motives, and desires. Determinism is about interactions which affect cognitive processes in people's lives. It concerns the cause and effect of human actions. Cause and result are always bound together in cognitive processes. It assumes that if an observer has sufficient information about an object or human being, then such an observer might be able to predict every consequent move of that object or human being. Determinism rarely requires that perfect prediction be practically possible.

Causal determinism posits that every event results from preceding events and natural laws, while nomological determinism emphasizes the predictability of the future from past and present states. Necessitarianism claims only one possible world exists, and predeterminism suggests events are fixed in advance, sometimes biologically or genetically. Fatalism and theological determinism attribute outcomes to fate or divine omniscience, whereas adequate determinism and interpretations of quantum mechanics explore probabilistic or emergent constraints on macroscopic phenomena. Philosophical varieties extend to human behavior, including biological, psychological, social, and cultural determinism, as well as structural determinism, which highlights systemic constraints. Historically, determinism appears in both Western traditions, from the Presocratics and Stoics to Newtonian mechanics, and Eastern philosophy, including karma, Ājīvika fatalism, and Buddhist dependent origination. Modern science recognizes deterministic models in classical physics and complex generative processes, while quantum mechanics introduces probabilistic and debated interpretations.

== Varieties ==
Determinism may commonly refer to any of the following viewpoints:

=== Causal ===
Causal determinism, sometimes synonymous with historical determinism (a sort of path dependence), is "the idea that every event is necessitated by antecedent events and conditions together with the laws of nature." However, it is a broad enough term to consider that:

...One's deliberations, choices, and actions will often be necessary links in the causal chain that brings something about. In other words, even though our deliberations, choices, and actions are themselves determined like everything else, it is still the case, according to causal determinism, that the occurrence or existence of yet other things depends upon our deliberating, choosing and acting in a certain way.

Causal determinism proposes that there is an unbroken chain of prior occurrences stretching back to the origin of the universe. The relation between events and the origin of the universe may not be specified. Causal determinists believe that there is nothing in the universe that has no cause or is self-caused. Causal determinism has also been considered more generally as the idea that everything that happens and exists is caused by antecedent conditions. In the case of nomological determinism, these conditions are considered events also, implying that the future is determined completely by preceding events—a combination of prior states of the universe and the laws of nature. These conditions can also be considered metaphysical in origin (such as in the case of theological determinism).

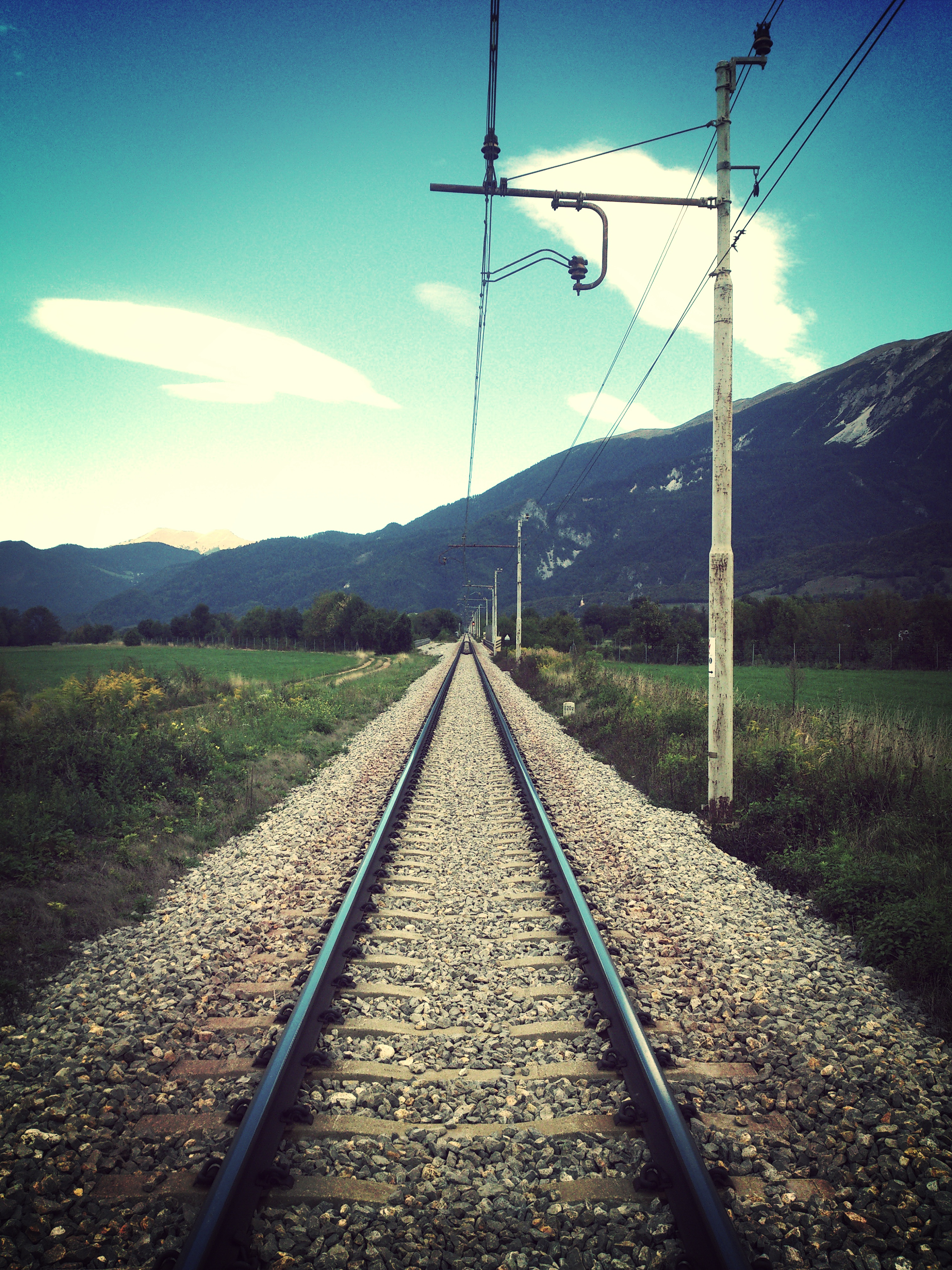
Many philosophical theories of determinism frame themselves with the idea that reality follows a sort of predetermined path.

==== Nomological ====
Nomological determinism is the most common form of causal determinism and is generally synonymous with physical determinism. This is the notion that the past and the present dictate the future entirely and necessarily by rigid natural laws and that every occurrence inevitably results from prior events. Nomological determinism is sometimes illustrated by the thought experiment of Laplace's demon. Laplace posited that an omniscient observer, knowing with infinite precision all the positions and velocities of every particle in the universe, could predict the future entirely. Ernest Nagel viewed determinism in terms of a physical state, declaring a theory to be deterministic if it predicts a state at other times uniquely from values at one given time.

==== Necessitarianism ====
Necessitarianism is a metaphysical principle that denies all mere possibility and maintains that there is only one possible way for the world to exist. Leucippus claimed there are no uncaused events and that everything occurs for a reason and by necessity.

=== Predeterminism ===
Predeterminism is the idea that all events are determined in advance. The concept is often argued by invoking causal determinism, implying that there is an unbroken chain of prior occurrences stretching back to the origin of the universe. In the case of predeterminism, this chain of events has been pre-established, and human actions cannot interfere with the outcomes of this pre-established chain.

Predeterminism can be categorized as a specific type of determinism when it is used to mean pre-established causal determinism. It can also be used interchangeably with causal determinism—in the context of its capacity to determine future events. However, predeterminism is often considered as independent of causal determinism.

==== Biological ====
The term predeterminism is also frequently used in the context of biology and heredity, in which case it represents a form of biological determinism, sometimes called genetic determinism. Biological determinism is the idea that all human behaviors, beliefs, and desires are fixed by human genetic nature.

Friedrich Nietzsche explained that human beings are "determined" by their bodies and are subject to its passions, impulses, and instincts.

=== Fatalism ===
Fatalism is normally distinguished from determinism, as a form of teleological determinism. Fatalism is the idea that everything is fated to happen, resulting in humans having no control over their future. Fate has arbitrary power, and does not necessarily follow any causal or deterministic laws. Types of fatalism include hard theological determinism and the idea of predestination, where there is a God who determines all that humans will do. This may be accomplished through either foreknowledge of their actions, achieved through omniscience or by predetermining their actions.

=== Theological ===
Theological determinism is a form of determinism that holds that all events that happen are either preordained (i.e., predestined) to happen by a monotheistic deity, or are destined to occur given its omniscience. Two forms of theological determinism exist, referred to as strong and weak theological determinism.

Strong theological determinism is based on the concept of a creator deity dictating all events in history: "everything that happens has been predestined to happen by an omniscient, omnipotent divinity."

Weak theological determinism is based on the concept of divine foreknowledge—"because God's omniscience is perfect, what God knows about the future will inevitably happen, which means, consequently, that the future is already fixed." There exist slight variations on this categorization, however. Some claim either that theological determinism requires predestination of all events and outcomes by the divinity—i.e., they do not classify the weaker version as theological determinism unless libertarian free will is assumed to be denied as a consequence—or that the weaker version does not constitute theological determinism at all.

Theological determinism can also be seen as a form of causal determinism, in which the antecedent conditions are the nature and will of God. Some have asserted that Augustine of Hippo introduced theological determinism into Christianity in 412 CE, whereas all prior Christian authors supported free will against Stoic and Gnostic determinism. However, there are many Biblical passages that seem to support the idea of some kind of theological determinism.

=== Adequate ===
Adequate determinism is the idea, because of quantum decoherence, that quantum indeterminacy can be ignored for most macroscopic events. Random quantum events "average out" in the limit of large numbers of particles (where the laws of quantum mechanics asymptotically approach the laws of classical mechanics). While there are specific examples of these random events magnified to macro levels, such as Geiger counters, they are still insignificant in the context of free will.

=== Determined probability ===
Stephen Hawking explained that the microscopic world of quantum mechanics is one of determined probabilities. That is, nature is not governed by laws that determine the future with certainty but by laws that determine the probability of various futures.

=== Many-worlds interpretation ===
The many-worlds interpretation of quantum mechanics accepts the linear causal sets of sequential events with adequate consistency yet also suggests constant forking of causal chains that can in principle be globally deterministic. Meaning the causal set of events leading to the present are all valid yet appear as a singular linear time stream within a much broader unseen conic probability field of other outcomes that "split off" from the locally observed timeline. Under this model causal sets are still "consistent" yet not exclusive to singular iterated outcomes.

The interpretation sidesteps the exclusive retrospective causal chain problem of "could not have done otherwise" by suggesting "the other outcome does exist" in a set of parallel states of the universe that (in one version) split off in any interacting event. This interpretation is sometimes described with the example of agent-based choices.

=== Philosophical varieties ===
==== Nature/nurture controversy ====
Although some of the above forms of determinism concern human behaviors and cognition, others frame themselves as an answer to the debate on nature and nurture. They will suggest that one factor will entirely determine behavior. As scientific understanding has grown, however, the strongest versions of these theories have been widely rejected as a single-cause fallacy. In other words, the modern deterministic theories attempt to explain how the interaction of both nature and nurture is entirely predictable. The concept of heritability has been helpful in making this distinction.

- Biological determinism, sometimes called genetic determinism, is the idea that each of human behaviors, beliefs, and desires are fixed by human genetic nature.
- Behaviorism involves the idea that all behavior can be traced to specific causes—either environmental or reflexive. John B. Watson and B. F. Skinner developed this nurture-focused determinism.
- Cultural materialism, contends that the physical world impacts and sets constraints on human behavior.
- Cultural determinism, along with social determinism, is the nurture-focused theory that the culture in which we are raised determines who we are.
- Environmental determinism, also known as climatic or geographical determinism, proposes that the physical environment, rather than social conditions, determines culture. Supporters of environmental determinism often also support behavioral determinism. Key proponents of this notion have included Ellen Churchill Semple, Ellsworth Huntington, Thomas Griffith Taylor and possibly Jared Diamond, although his status as an environmental determinist is debated.

==== Determinism and prediction ====
Other deterministic theories actually seek only to highlight the importance of a particular factor in predicting the future. These theories often use the factor as a sort of guide or constraint on the future. They need not suppose that complete knowledge of that one factor would allow the making of perfect predictions.

- Psychological determinism can mean that humans must act according to reason, but it can also be synonymous with some sort of psychological egoism. The latter is the view that humans will always act according to their perceived best interest.
- Linguistic determinism proposes that language determines (or at least limits) the things that humans can think and say and thus know. The Sapir–Whorf hypothesis argues that individuals experience the world based on the grammatical structures they habitually use.
- Economic determinism attributes primacy to economic structure over politics in the development of human history. It is associated with the dialectical materialism of Karl Marx.
- Technological determinism is the theory that a society's technology drives the development of its social structure and cultural values.

== Structural ==
Structural determinism is the philosophical view that actions, events, and processes are predicated on and determined by structural factors. Given any particular structure or set of estimable components, it is a concept that emphasizes rational and predictable outcomes. Chilean biologists Humberto Maturana and Francisco Varela popularized the notion, writing that a living system's general order is maintained via a circular process of ongoing self-referral, and thus its organization and structure defines the changes it undergoes. According to the authors, a system can undergo changes of state (alteration of structure without loss of identity) or disintegrations (alteration of structure with loss of identity). Such changes or disintegrations are not ascertained by the elements of the disturbing agent, as each disturbance will only trigger responses in the respective system, which in turn, are determined by each system's own structure.

On an individualistic level, what this means is that human beings as free and independent entities are triggered to react by external stimuli or change in circumstance. However, their own internal state and existing physical and mental capacities determine their responses to those triggers. On a much broader societal level, structural determinists believe that larger issues in the society—especially those pertaining to minorities and subjugated communities—are predominantly assessed through existing structural conditions, making change of prevailing conditions difficult, and sometimes outright impossible. For example, the concept has been applied to the politics of race in the United States of America and other Western countries such as the United Kingdom and Australia, with structural determinists lamenting structural factors for the prevalence of racism in these countries. Additionally, Marxists have conceptualized the writings of Karl Marx within the context of structural determinism as well. For example, Louis Althusser, a structural Marxist, argued that the state, in its political, economic, and legal structures, reproduces the discourse of capitalism, in turn, allowing for the burgeoning of capitalistic structures.

Proponents of the notion highlight the usefulness of structural determinism to study complicated issues related to race and gender, as it highlights often gilded structural conditions that block meaningful change. Critics call it too rigid, reductionist and inflexible. Additionally, they also criticize the notion for overemphasizing deterministic forces such as structure over the role of human agency and the ability of the people to act. These critics argue that politicians, academics, and social activists have the capability to bring about significant change despite stringent structural conditions.

=== With free will ===
Philosophers have debated both the truth of determinism, and the truth of free will. This creates the four possible positions in the figure. Compatibilism refers to the view that free will is, in some sense, compatible with determinism. The three incompatibilist positions deny this possibility. The hard incompatibilists hold that free will is incompatible with both determinism and indeterminism, the libertarians that determinism does not hold, and free will might exist, and the hard determinists that determinism does hold and free will does not exist. The Dutch philosopher Baruch Spinoza was a determinist thinker, and argued that human freedom can be achieved through knowledge of the causes that determine desire and affections. He defined human servitude as the state of bondage of anyone who is aware of their own desires, but ignorant of the causes that determined them. However, the free or virtuous person becomes capable, through reason and knowledge, to be genuinely free, even as they are being "determined". For the Dutch philosopher, acting out of one's own internal necessity is genuine freedom while being driven by exterior determinations is akin to bondage. Spinoza's thoughts on human servitude and liberty are respectively detailed in the fourth and fifth volumes of his work Ethics.

The standard argument against free will, according to philosopher J. J. C. Smart, focuses on the implications of determinism for free will. He suggests free will is denied whether determinism is true or not. He says that if determinism is true, all actions are predicted and no one is assumed to be free; however, if determinism is false, all actions are presumed to be random and as such no one seems free because they have no part in controlling what happens.

=== With the soul ===
Some determinists argue that materialism does not present a complete understanding of the universe, because while it can describe determinate interactions among material things, it ignores the minds or souls of conscious beings.

A number of positions can be delineated:

- Immaterial souls are all that exist (idealism).
- Immaterial souls exist and exert a nondeterministic causal influence on bodies (traditional free will, interactionist dualism).
- Immaterial souls exist but are part of a deterministic framework.
- Immaterial souls exist, but exert no causal influence, free or determined (epiphenomenalism, occasionalism)
- Immaterial souls do not exist – there is no mind–body dichotomy, and there is a materialistic explanation for intuitions to the contrary.

=== With ethics and morality ===
Another topic of debate is the implication that determinism has on morality.

Philosopher and incompatibilist Peter van Inwagen introduced the following thesis arguing that free will is required for moral judgments:

1. The moral judgment that X should not have been done implies that something else should have been done instead.
2. That something else should have been done instead implies that there was something else to do.
3. That there was something else to do, implies that something else could have been done.
4. That something else could have been done implies that there is free will.
5. If there is no free will to have done other than X we cannot make the moral judgment that X should not have been done.

In contrast to such views, philosopher Harry Frankfurt challenged the "principle of alternate possibilities", which states that a person is morally responsible for an action only if they could have done otherwise. Against this principle, Frankfurt proposes cases in which an individual appears morally responsible even though alternative courses of action are not genuinely available. In his examples, an external agent (referred to as Black) has the capacity to monitor an individual's decision-making and stands ready to intervene, for instance by altering the individual's mental processes, to ensure a particular decision if the individual were about to choose otherwise. However, in the scenario Frankfurt describes, this intervention never occurs because the individual (Jones) independently makes the same decision. In such cases, although Jones could not have done otherwise because intervention would have occurred if he had tried to choose differently, Frankfurt contends that this lack of alternatives plays no role in bringing about the action and therefore does not undermine moral responsibility. These Frankfurt-style cases have been influential in compatibilist accounts of free will, as they suggest that moral responsibility may not depend on the availability of alternative possibilities.

Similarly, P. F. Strawson has argued that the debate over determinism and moral responsibility should be understood in terms of ordinary interpersonal practices rather than resolved solely by appeal to abstract metaphysical conditions. Strawson distinguishes between "optimists", who maintain that moral responsibility is compatible with determinism, and "pessimists", who hold that moral responsibility has no application if determinism is true, and seeks to reconcile these positions by examining the role of what he calls "reactive attitudes". These include attitudes such as resentment, gratitude, and forgiveness, which are natural human responses to the perceived good or ill will of others toward oneself or others, as expressed in their actions. Strawson argues that these attitudes, along with their more general or "vicarious" forms directed toward the treatment of others, underlie moral practices and concepts. He contrasts "participant" attitudes with the "objective attitude", in which individuals are regarded as objects of management or treatment rather than as participants in interpersonal relationships. Such a stance is typically adopted in particular cases involving abnormality or incapacity, rather than as a result of any general belief about the truth of determinism. He contends that it is not psychologically possible for human beings to abandon participant attitudes altogether in favor of a wholly objective stance, even if determinism were true. On this account, moral responsibility is grounded in the structure of interpersonal relationships and reactive attitudes, and is therefore not undermined by determinism.

== History ==
Determinism was developed by the Greek philosophers during the 7th and 6th centuries BCE by the Pre-socratic philosophers Heraclitus and Leucippus, later Aristotle, and mainly by the Stoics. Some of the main philosophers who have dealt with this issue are Marcus Aurelius, Omar Khayyam, Thomas Hobbes, Baruch Spinoza, Gottfried Leibniz, David Hume, Baron d'Holbach (Paul Heinrich Dietrich), Pierre-Simon Laplace, Arthur Schopenhauer, William James, Friedrich Nietzsche, Albert Einstein, Niels Bohr, Ralph Waldo Emerson and, more recently, John Searle, Ted Honderich, and Daniel Dennett.

Mecca Chiesa notes that the probabilistic or selectionistic determinism of B. F. Skinner comprised a wholly separate conception of determinism that was not mechanistic at all. Mechanistic determinism assumes that every event has an unbroken chain of prior occurrences, but a selectionistic or probabilistic model does not.

=== Western tradition ===
In the West, some elements of determinism have been expressed in Greece from the 6th century BCE by the Presocratics Heraclitus and Leucippus. The first notions of determinism appears to originate with the Stoics, as part of their theory of universal causal determinism. The resulting philosophical debates, which involved the confluence of elements of Aristotelian Ethics with Stoic psychology, led in the 1st–3rd centuries CE in the works of Alexander of Aphrodisias to the first recorded Western debate over determinism and freedom, an issue that is known in theology as the paradox of free will. The writings of Epictetus as well as middle Platonist and early Christian thought were instrumental in this development. Jewish philosopher Moses Maimonides said of the deterministic implications of an omniscient god: "Does God know or does He not know that a certain individual will be good or bad? If thou sayest 'He knows', then it necessarily follows that [that] man is compelled to act as God knew beforehand he would act, otherwise God's knowledge would be imperfect."

==== Newtonian mechanics ====
Determinism in the West is often associated with Newtonian mechanics/physics, which depicts the physical matter of the universe as operating according to a set of fixed laws. The "billiard ball" hypothesis, a product of Newtonian physics, argues that once the initial conditions of the universe have been established, the rest of the history of the universe follows inevitably. If it were actually possible to have complete knowledge of physical matter and all of the laws governing that matter at any one time, then it would be theoretically possible to compute the time and place of every event that will ever occur (Laplace's demon). In this sense, the basic particles of the universe operate in the same fashion as the rolling balls on a billiard table, moving and striking each other in predictable ways to produce predictable results.

Whether or not it is all-encompassing in so doing, Newtonian mechanics deals only with caused events; for example, if an object begins in a known position and is hit dead on by an object with some known velocity, then it will be pushed straight toward another predictable point. If it goes somewhere else, the Newtonians argue, one must question one's measurements of the original position of the object, the exact direction of the striking object, gravitational or other fields that were inadvertently ignored, etc. Then, they maintain, repeated experiments and improvements in accuracy will always bring one's observations closer to the theoretically predicted results. When dealing with situations on an ordinary human scale, Newtonian physics has been successful. But it fails as velocities become some substantial fraction of the speed of light and when interactions at the atomic scale are studied. Before the discovery of quantum effects and other challenges to Newtonian physics, "uncertainty" was always a term that applied to the accuracy of human knowledge about causes and effects, and not to the causes and effects themselves.

Newtonian mechanics, as well as any following physical theories, are results of observations and experiments, and so they describe "how it all works" within a tolerance. However, old western scientists believed if there are any logical connections found between an observed cause and effect, there must be also some absolute natural laws behind. Belief in perfect natural laws driving everything, instead of just describing what we should expect, led to searching for a set of universal simple laws that rule the world. This movement significantly encouraged deterministic views in Western philosophy, as well as the related theological views of classical pantheism.

=== Eastern tradition ===
Throughout history, the belief that the entire universe is a deterministic system subject to the will of fate or destiny has been articulated in both Eastern and Western religions, philosophy, music, and literature.

The ancient Arabs that inhabited the Arabian Peninsula before the advent of Islam used to profess a widespread belief in fatalism (ḳadar) alongside a fearful consideration for the sky and the stars as divine beings, which they held to be ultimately responsible for every phenomena that occurs on Earth and for the destiny of humankind. Accordingly, they shaped their entire lives in accordance with their interpretations of astral configurations and phenomena.

In the I Ching and philosophical Taoism, the ebb and flow of favorable and unfavorable conditions suggests the path of least resistance is effortless (see: Wu wei). In the philosophical schools of the Indian Subcontinent, the concept of karma deals with similar philosophical issues to the Western concept of determinism. Karma is understood as a spiritual mechanism which causes the eternal cycle of birth, death, and rebirth (saṃsāra). Karma, either positive or negative, accumulates according to an individual's actions throughout their life, and at their death determines the nature of their next life in the cycle of Saṃsāra. Most major religions originating in India hold this belief to some degree, most notably Hinduism, Jainism, Sikhism, and Buddhism.

The views on the interaction of karma and free will are numerous, and diverge from each other. For example, in Sikhism, god's grace, gained through worship, can erase one's karmic debts, a belief which reconciles the principle of karma with a monotheistic god one must freely choose to worship. Jainists believe in compatibilism, in which the cycle of Saṃsara is a completely mechanistic process, occurring without any divine intervention. The Jains hold an atomic view of reality, in which particles of karma form the fundamental microscopic building material of the universe.

=== Ājīvika ===
In ancient India, the Ājīvika school of philosophy founded by Makkhali Gosāla (around 500 BCE), otherwise referred to as "Ājīvikism" in Western scholarship, upheld the Niyati ("Fate") doctrine of absolute fatalism or determinism, which negates the existence of free will and karma, and is therefore considered one of the nāstika or "heterodox" schools of Indian philosophy. The oldest descriptions of the Ājīvika fatalists and their founder Gosāla can be found both in the Buddhist and Jaina scriptures of ancient India. The predetermined fate of all sentient beings and the impossibility to achieve liberation (mokṣa) from the eternal cycle of birth, death, and rebirth (saṃsāra) was the major distinctive philosophical and metaphysical doctrine of this heterodox school of Indian philosophy, annoverated among the other Śramaṇa movements that emerged in India during the Second urbanization (600–200 BCE).

=== Buddhism ===
Buddhist philosophy contains several concepts which some scholars describe as deterministic to various levels. However, the direct analysis of Buddhist metaphysics through the lens of determinism is difficult, due to the differences between European and Buddhist traditions of thought.

One concept which is argued to support a hard determinism is the doctrine of dependent origination (pratītyasamutpāda) in the early Buddhist texts, which states that all phenomena (dharma) are necessarily caused by some other phenomenon, which it can be said to be dependent on, like links in a massive, never-ending chain; the basic principle is that all things (dharmas, phenomena, principles) arise in dependence upon other things, which means that they are fundamentally "empty" or devoid of any intrinsic, eternal essence and therefore are impermanent. In traditional Buddhist philosophy, this concept is used to explain the functioning of the eternal cycle of birth, death, and rebirth (saṃsāra); all thoughts and actions exert a karmic force that attaches to the individual's consciousness, which will manifest through reincarnation and results in future lives. In other words, righteous or unrighteous actions in one life will necessarily cause good or bad responses in another future life or more lives. The early Buddhist texts and later Tibetan Buddhist scriptures associate dependent arising with the fundamental Buddhist doctrines of emptiness (śūnyatā) and non-self (anattā).

Another Buddhist concept which many scholars perceive to be deterministic is the doctrine of non-self (anattā). In Buddhism, attaining enlightenment involves one realizing that neither in humans nor any other sentient beings there is a fundamental core of permanent being, identity, or personality which can be called the "soul", and that all sentient beings (including humans) are instead made of several, constantly changing factors which bind them to the eternal cycle of birth, death, and rebirth (saṃsāra). Sentient beings are composed of the five aggregates of existence (skandha): matter, sensation, perception, mental formations, and consciousness. In the Saṃyutta Nikāya of the Pāli Canon, a Buddhist nun is recorded as saying that "just as the word 'chariot' exists on the basis of the aggregation of parts, even so the concept of 'being' exists when the five aggregates are available" (SN 5.10). The early Buddhist texts outline different ways in which dependent origination is a middle way between different sets of "extreme" views (such as "monist" and "pluralist" ontologies or materialist and dualist views of mind-body relation). In the Kaccānagotta Sutta of the Pāli Canon (SN 12.15, parallel at SA 301), the historical Buddha stated that "this world mostly relies on the dual notions of existence and non-existence" and then explains the right view as follows:

But when you truly see the origin of the world with right understanding, you won't have the notion of non-existence regarding the world. And when you truly see the cessation of the world with right understanding, you won't have the notion of existence regarding the world.

Some Western scholars argue that the concept of non-self necessarily disproves the ideas of free will and moral responsibility. If there is no autonomous self, in this view, and all events are necessarily and unchangeably caused by others, then no type of autonomy can be said to exist, moral or otherwise. However, other scholars disagree, claiming that the Buddhist conception of the universe allows for a form of compatibilism. Buddhism perceives reality occurring on two different levels: the ultimate reality, which can only be truly understood by the enlightened ones, and the illusory or false reality of the material world, which is considered to be "real" or "true" by those who are ignorant about the nature of metaphysical reality; i.e., those who still haven't achieved enlightenment. Therefore, Buddhism perceives free will as a notion belonging to the illusory belief in the unchanging self or personhood that pertains to the false reality of the material world, while concepts like non-self and dependent origination belong to the ultimate reality; the transition between the two can be truly understood, Buddhists claim, by one who has attained enlightenment.

== Modern scientific perspective ==
=== Generative processes ===
Although it was once thought by scientists that any indeterminism in quantum mechanics occurred at too small a scale to influence biological or neurological systems, there is an indication that nervous systems are influenced by quantum indeterminism due to chaos theory. It is unclear what implications this has for the problem of free will given various possible reactions to the problem in the first place. Many biologists do not grant determinism: Christof Koch, for instance, argues against it, and in favour of libertarian free will, by making arguments based on generative processes (emergence). Other proponents of emergentist or generative philosophy, cognitive sciences, and evolutionary psychology argue that a certain form of determinism (not necessarily causal) is true. They suggest instead that an illusion of free will is experienced due to the generation of infinite behaviour from the interaction of finite-deterministic set of rules and parameters. Thus the unpredictability of the emerging behaviour from deterministic processes leads to a perception of free will, even though free will as an ontological entity does not exist.

An animation of Conway's Game of Life, where the interaction of just four simple rules creates patterns that seem somehow "alive"

As an illustration, the strategy board-games chess and Go have rigorous rules in which no information (such as cards' face-values) is hidden from either player and no random events (such as dice-rolling) happen within the game. Yet, chess and especially Go with its extremely simple deterministic rules, can still have an extremely large number of unpredictable moves. When chess is simplified to 7 or fewer pieces, however, endgame tables are available that dictate which moves to play to achieve a perfect game. This implies that, given a less complex environment (with the original 32 pieces reduced to 7 or fewer pieces), a perfectly predictable game of chess is possible. In this scenario, the winning player can announce that a checkmate will happen within a given number of moves, assuming a perfect defense by the losing player, or fewer moves if the defending player chooses sub-optimal moves as the game progresses into its inevitable, predicted conclusion. By this analogy, it is suggested, the experience of free will emerges from the interaction of finite rules and deterministic parameters that generate nearly infinite and practically unpredictable behavioural responses. In theory, if all these events could be accounted for, and there were a known way to evaluate these events, the seemingly unpredictable behaviour would become predictable. Another hands-on example of generative processes is John Horton Conway's playable Game of Life. Nassim Taleb is wary of such models, and coined the term "ludic fallacy."

=== Compatibility with the existence of science ===
Certain philosophers of science argue that, while causal determinism (in which everything including the brain/mind is subject to the laws of causality) is compatible with minds capable of science, fatalism and predestination is not. These philosophers make the distinction that causal determinism means that each step is determined by the step before and therefore allows sensory input from observational data to determine what conclusions the brain reaches, while fatalism in which the steps between do not connect an initial cause to the results would make it impossible for observational data to correct false hypotheses. This is often combined with the argument that if the brain had fixed views and the arguments were mere after-constructs with no causal effect on the conclusions, science would have been impossible and the use of arguments would have been a meaningless waste of energy with no persuasive effect on brains with fixed views.

=== Mathematical models ===
Many mathematical models of physical systems are deterministic. This is true of most models involving differential equations (notably, those measuring rate of change over time). Mathematical models that are not deterministic because they involve randomness are called stochastic. Because of sensitive dependence on initial conditions, some deterministic models may appear to behave nondeterministically; in such cases, a deterministic interpretation of the model may not be useful due to numerical instability and a finite amount of precision in measurement. Such considerations can motivate the consideration of a stochastic model even though the underlying system is governed by deterministic equations.

=== Quantum and classical mechanics ===
==== Classical theories ====
Since the beginning of the 20th century, quantum mechanics—the physics of the extremely small—has revealed previously concealed aspects of events. Before that, Newtonian physics—the physics of everyday life—dominated. Taken in isolation (rather than as an approximation to quantum mechanics), Newtonian physics depicts a universe in which objects move in perfectly determined ways. At the scale where humans exist and interact with the universe, Newtonian mechanics remain useful, and make relatively accurate predictions (e.g. calculating the trajectory of a bullet). But whereas in theory, absolute knowledge of the forces accelerating a bullet would produce an absolutely accurate prediction of its path, modern quantum mechanics casts reasonable doubt on this main thesis of determinism.

This doubt takes radically different forms. The observed results of quantum mechanics are random but various interpretations of quantum mechanics make different assumptions about determinism which cannot be distinguished experimentally. The standard interpretation widely used by physicists is not deterministic, but the other interpretations have been devised which are deterministic.

==== Standard quantum mechanics ====
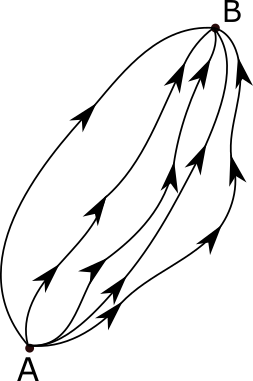
These are five of the infinitely many paths available for a particle to move from point A at time t to point B at time t'(>t).

Quantum mechanics is the product of a careful application of the scientific method, logic and empiricism. Through a large number of careful experiments physicists developed a rather unintuitive mental model: A particle's path cannot be specified in from its quantum description. "Path" is a classical, practical attribute in everyday life, but one that quantum particles do not possess. Quantum mechanics attributes probability to all possible paths and asserts the only one outcome will be observed.

The randomness in quantum mechanics derives from the quantum aspect of the model. Different experimental results are obtained for each individual quanta. Only the probability can predicted. As Stephen Hawking explains, the result is not traditional determinism, but rather determined probabilities. As far as the thesis of determinism is concerned, these probabilities, at least, are quite determined.

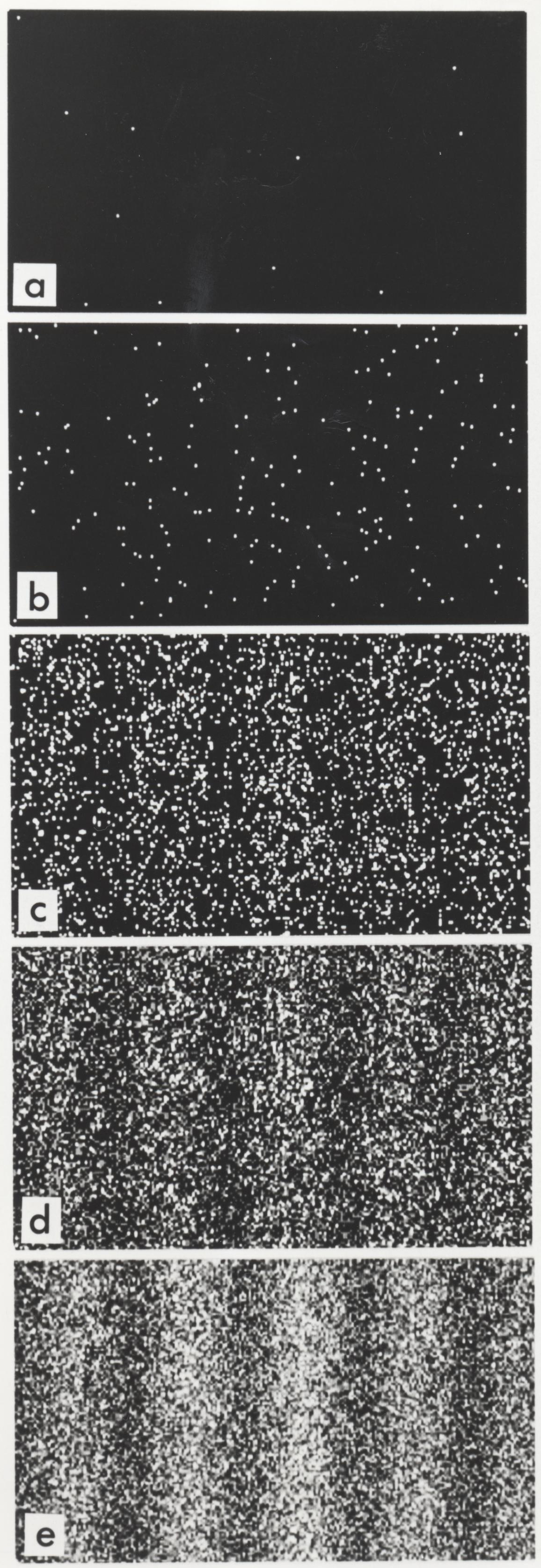
Although it is not possible to predict the arrival position or time for any particle, probabilities of arrival predict the final pattern of events.

On the topic of predictable probabilities, the double-slit experiments are a popular example. Photons are fired one-by-one through a double-slit apparatus at a distant screen. They do not arrive at any single point, nor even the two points lined up with the slits (the way it might be expected of bullets fired by a fixed gun at a distant target). Instead, the photons arrive in varying concentrations and times across the screen, and only the final distribution of photons can be predicted. In that sense the behavior of light in this apparatus is predictable, but there is no way to predict where or when in the resulting interference pattern any single photon will make its contribution.

Some (including Albert Einstein) have argued that the inability to predict any more than probabilities is simply due to ignorance. The idea is that, beyond the conditions and laws can be observed or deduced, there are also hidden factors or "hidden variables" that determine absolutely in which order photons reach the detector screen. It follows that the course of the universe is absolutely determined, but that humans are screened from knowledge of the determinative factors. In that case, it only appears that things proceed in a probabilistic way.

John Stewart Bell analyzed Einstein's work in his famous Bell's theorem, which demonstrates that quantum mechanics can make statistical predictions that would be violated if local hidden variables really existed. Many experiments have verified the quantum predictions.

=== Other interpretations ===
Bell's theorem only applies to local hidden variables. Quantum mechanics can be formulated with non-local hidden variables to achieve a deterministic theory that is in agreement with experiment. An example is the Bohm interpretation of quantum mechanics. Bohm's Interpretation, though, violates special relativity and it is highly controversial whether or not it can be reconciled without giving up on determinism.

The many-worlds interpretation focuses on the deterministic nature of the Schrodinger's equation. For any closed system, including the entire universe, the wavefunction solutions to this equation evolve deterministically. The apparent randomness of observations corresponds to branching of the wavefunction, with one world for each possible outcome.

Another foundational assumption to quantum mechanics is that of free will, which has been argued to be foundational to the scientific method as a whole. Bell acknowledged that abandoning this assumption would both allow for the maintenance of determinism as well as locality. This perspective is known as superdeterminism, and is defended by some physicists such as Sabine Hossenfelder and Tim Palmer.

More advanced variations on these arguments include quantum contextuality, by Bell, Simon B. Kochen and Ernst Specker, which argues that hidden variable theories cannot be "sensible", meaning that the values of the hidden variables inherently depend on the devices used to measure them.

This debate is relevant because there are possibly specific situations in which the arrival of an electron at a screen at a certain point and time would trigger one event, whereas its arrival at another point would trigger an entirely different event (e.g. see Schrödinger's cat—a thought experiment used as part of a deeper debate).

In his 1939 address "The Relation between Mathematics and Physics", Paul Dirac pointed out that purely deterministic classical mechanics cannot explain the cosmological origins of the universe; today the early universe is modeled quantum mechanically.

Nevertheless, the question of determinism in modern physics remains debated. On one hand, Albert Einstein's theory of relativity, which represents an advancement over Newtonian mechanics, is based on a deterministic framework. On the other hand, Einstein himself resisted the indeterministic view of quantum mechanics, as evidenced by his famous debates with Niels Bohr, which continued until his death.

Moreover, chaos theory highlights that even within a deterministic framework, the ability to precisely predict the evolution of a system is often limited. A deterministic system may appear random: two apparently identical starting points can result in vastly different results. Such dynamical systems are sensitive to initial conditions. Even if the universe followed a strict deterministic order, the human capacity to predict every event and comprehend all underlying causes would still be constrained this kind of sensitivity.

Adequate determinism (see Varieties, above) is the reason that Stephen Hawking called libertarian free will "just an illusion".
