= Libertarianism (metaphysics) =

Term in metaphysics

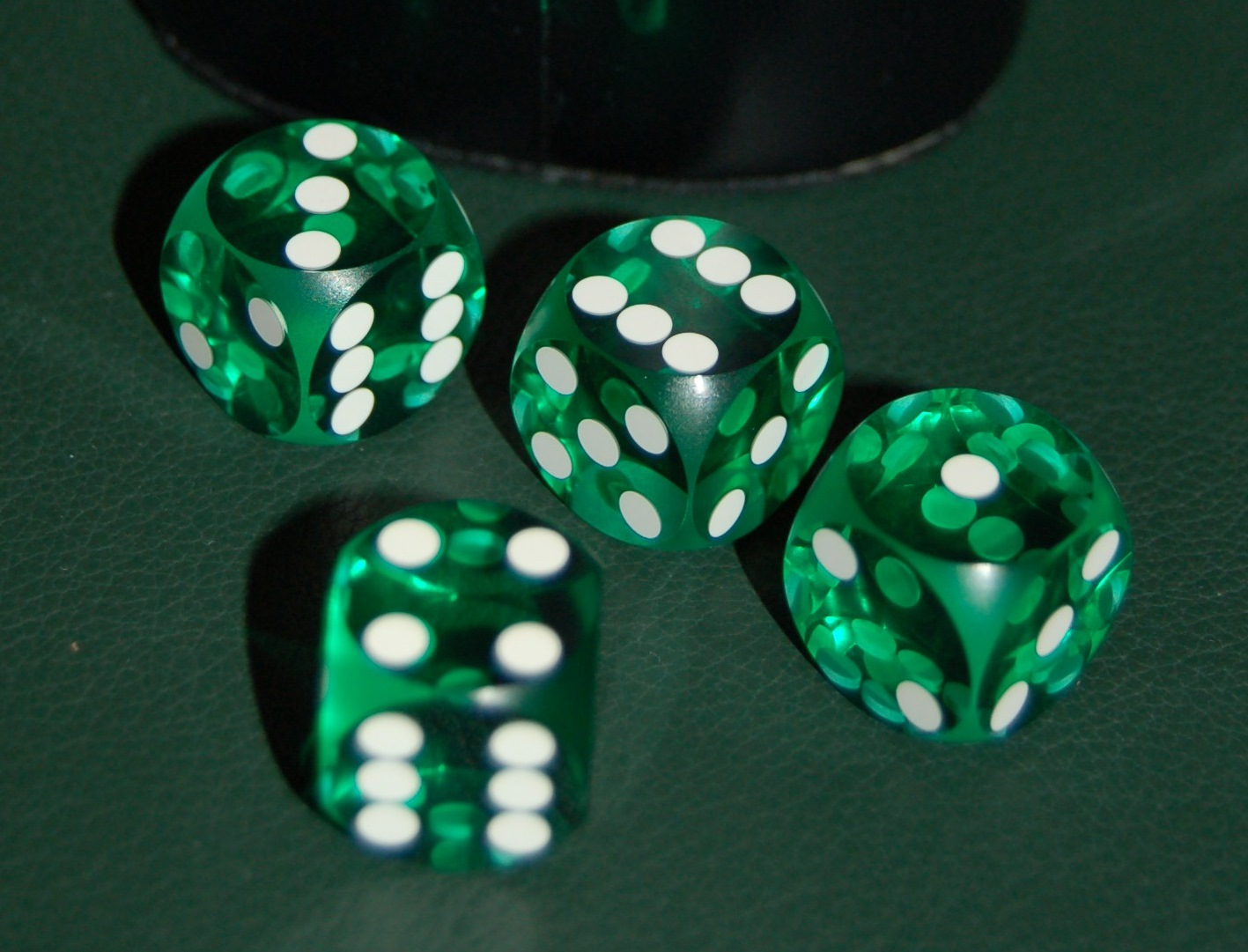
The task of the metaphysical libertarian is to reconcile free will with indeterminism.

Metaphysical libertarianism is the philosophical view that free will exists, that it is incompatible with determinism, and therefore that determinism is false. In the branch of philosophy known as metaphysics, libertarianism is one of the main positions related to the problems of free will and determinism. In particular, libertarianism is an incompatibilist position which argues that free will is logically incompatible with a deterministic universe. Libertarianism states that since agents have free will, determinism must be false.

One of the first clear formulations of libertarianism is found in John Duns Scotus. In a theological context, metaphysical libertarianism was notably defended by Jesuit authors like Luis de Molina and Francisco Suárez against the rather compatibilist Thomism of Domingo Báñez. Other important metaphysical libertarians in the early modern period were René Descartes, George Berkeley, Immanuel Kant and Thomas Reid.

Roderick Chisholm was a prominent defender of libertarianism in the 20th century and contemporary libertarians include Robert Kane, Geert Keil, Peter van Inwagen and Robert Nozick.

== Overview ==
The first recorded use of the term libertarianism was in 1789 by William Belsham in a discussion of free will and in opposition to necessitarian or determinist views.

Metaphysical libertarianism is one philosophical viewpoint under that of incompatibilism. Libertarianism holds onto a concept of free will that requires the agent to be able to take more than one possible course of action under a given set of circumstances.

Accounts of libertarianism subdivide into non-physical theories and physical or naturalistic theories. Non-physical theories hold that the events in the brain that lead to the performance of actions do not have an entirely physical explanation, and consequently the world is not closed under physics. Such interactionist dualists believe that some non-physical mind, will, or soul overrides physical causality.

Explanations of libertarianism that do not involve dispensing with physicalism require physical indeterminism, such as probabilistic subatomic particle behavior—a theory unknown to many of the early writers on free will. Physical determinism, under the assumption of physicalism, implies there is only one possible future and is therefore not compatible with libertarian free will. Some libertarian explanations involve invoking panpsychism, the theory that a quality of mind is associated with all particles, and pervades the entire universe, in both animate and inanimate entities. Other approaches do not require free will to be a fundamental constituent of the universe; ordinary randomness is appealed to as supplying the "elbow room" believed to be necessary by libertarians.

Free volition is regarded as a particular kind of complex, high-level process with an element of indeterminism. An example of this kind of approach has been developed by Robert Kane, where he hypothesizes that,

In each case, the indeterminism is functioning as a hindrance or obstacle to her realizing one of her purposes—a hindrance or obstacle in the form of resistance within her will which has to be overcome by effort.

Although at the time quantum mechanics (and physical indeterminism) was only in the initial stages of acceptance, in his book Miracles: A preliminary study C. S. Lewis stated the logical possibility that if the physical world were proved indeterministic this would provide an entry point to describe an action of a non-physical entity on physical reality. Indeterministic physical models (particularly those involving quantum indeterminacy) introduce random occurrences at an atomic or subatomic level. These events might affect brain activity, and could seemingly allow incompatibilist free will if the apparent indeterminacy of some mental processes (for instance, subjective perceptions of control in conscious volition) maps to the underlying indeterminacy of the physical construct. This relationship, however, requires a causative role over probabilities that is questionable, and it is far from established that brain activity responsible for human action can be affected by such events. Secondarily, these incompatibilist models are dependent upon the relationship between action and conscious volition, as studied in the neuroscience of free will. It is evident that observation may disturb the outcome of the observation itself, rendering limited our ability to identify causality. Niels Bohr, one of the main architects of quantum theory, suggested, however, that no connection could be made between indeterminism of nature and freedom of will.

== Agent-causal theories ==
In non-physical theories of free will, agents are assumed to have power to intervene in the physical world, a view known as agent causation. Proponents of agent causation include George Berkeley, Thomas Reid, and Roderick Chisholm.

Most events can be explained as the effects of prior events. When a tree falls, it does so because of the force of the wind, its own structural weakness, and so on. However, when a person performs a free act, agent causation theorists say that the action was not caused by any other events or states of affairs, but rather was caused by the agent. Agent causation is ontologically separate from event causation. The action was not uncaused, because the agent caused it. But the agent's causing it was not determined by the agent's character, desires, or past, since that would just be event causation. As Chisholm explains it, humans have "a prerogative which some would attribute only to God: each of us, when we act, is a prime mover unmoved. In doing what we do, we cause certain events to happen, and nothing—or no one—causes us to cause those events to happen."

This theory involves a difficulty which has long been associated with the idea of an unmoved mover. If a free action was not caused by any event, such as a change in the agent or an act of the will, then what is the difference between saying that an agent caused the event and simply saying that the event happened on its own? As William James put it, "If a 'free' act be a sheer novelty, that comes not from me, the previous me, but ex nihilo, and simply tacks itself on to me, how can I, the previous I, be responsible? How can I have any permanent character that will stand still long enough for praise or blame to be awarded?" Agent causation advocates respond that agent causation is actually more intuitive than event causation. They point to David Hume's argument that when we see two events happen in succession, our belief that one event caused the other cannot be justified rationally (known as the problem of induction). If that is so, where does our belief in causality come from? According to Thomas Reid, "the conception of an efficient cause may very probably be derived from the experience we have had ... of our own power to produce certain effects." Our everyday experiences of agent causation provide the basis for the idea of event causation.

== Event-causal theories ==
Event-causal accounts of incompatibilist free will typically rely upon physicalist models of mind (like those of the compatibilist), yet they presuppose physical indeterminism, in which certain indeterministic events are said to be caused by the agent. A number of event-causal accounts of free will have been created, referenced here as deliberative indeterminism, centred accounts, and efforts of will theory. The first two accounts do not require free will to be a fundamental constituent of the universe. Ordinary randomness is appealed to as supplying the "elbow room" that libertarians believe necessary. A first common objection to event-causal accounts is that the indeterminism could be destructive and could therefore diminish control by the agent rather than provide it (related to the problem of origination). A second common objection to these models is that it is questionable whether such indeterminism could add any value to deliberation over that which is already present in a deterministic world.

Deliberative indeterminism asserts that the indeterminism is confined to an earlier stage in the decision process. This is intended to provide an indeterminate set of possibilities to choose from, while not risking the introduction of luck (random decision making). The selection process is deterministic, although it may be based on earlier preferences established by the same process. Deliberative indeterminism has been referenced by Daniel Dennett and John Martin Fischer. An obvious objection to such a view is that an agent cannot be assigned ownership over their decisions (or preferences used to make those decisions) to any greater degree than that of a compatibilist model.

Centred accounts propose that for any given decision between two possibilities, the strength of reason will be considered for each option, yet there is still a probability the weaker candidate will be chosen. An obvious objection to such a view is that decisions are explicitly left up to chance, and origination or responsibility cannot be assigned for any given decision.

Efforts of will theory is related to the role of will power in decision making. It suggests that the indeterminacy of agent volition processes could map to the indeterminacy of certain physical events—and the outcomes of these events could therefore be considered caused by the agent. Models of volition have been constructed in which it is seen as a particular kind of complex, high-level process with an element of physical indeterminism. An example of this approach is that of Robert Kane, where he hypothesizes that "in each case, the indeterminism is functioning as a hindrance or obstacle to her realizing one of her purposes—a hindrance or obstacle in the form of resistance within her will which must be overcome by effort." According to Robert Kane such "ultimate responsibility" is a required condition for free will. An important factor in such a theory is that the agent cannot be reduced to physical neuronal events, but rather mental processes are said to provide an equally valid account of the determination of outcome as their physical processes (see non-reductive physicalism).

=== Epicurus ===
Epicurus, an ancient Hellenistic philosopher, argued that as atoms moved through the void, there were occasions when they would "swerve" (clinamen) from their otherwise determined paths, thus initiating new causal chains. Epicurus argued that these swerves would allow us to be more responsible for our actions, something impossible if every action was deterministically caused.

Epicurus did not say the swerve was directly involved in decisions. But following Aristotle, Epicurus thought human agents have the autonomous ability to transcend necessity and chance (both of which destroy responsibility), so that praise and blame are appropriate. Epicurus finds a tertium quid, beyond necessity and beyond chance. His tertium quid is agent autonomy, what is "up to us."

[S]ome things happen of necessity (ἀνάγκη), others by chance (τύχη), others through our own agency (παρ' ἡμᾶς). [...]. [N]ecessity destroys responsibility and chance is inconstant; whereas our own actions are autonomous, and it is to them that praise and blame naturally attach.

The Epicurean philosopher Lucretius (1st century BC) saw the randomness as enabling free will, even if he could not explain exactly how, beyond the fact that random swerves would break the causal chain of determinism.

Again, if all motion is always one long chain, and new motion arises out of the old in order invariable, and if the first-beginnings do not make by swerving a beginning of motion such as to break the decrees of fate, that cause may not follow cause from infinity, whence comes this freedom (libera) in living creatures all over the earth, whence I say is this will (voluntas) wrested from the fates by which we proceed whither pleasure leads each, swerving also our motions not at fixed times and fixed places, but just where our mind has taken us? For undoubtedly it is his own will in each that begins these things, and from the will movements go rippling through the limbs.

However, the interpretation of these ancient philosophers is controversial. Tim O'Keefe has argued that Epicurus and Lucretius were not libertarians at all, but compatibilists.

=== Robert Nozick ===
Robert Nozick put forward an indeterministic theory of free will in Philosophical Explanations (1981).

When human beings become agents through reflexive self-awareness, they express their agency by having reasons for acting, to which they assign weights. Choosing the dimensions of one's identity is a special case, in which the assigning of weight to a dimension is partly self-constitutive. But all acting for reasons is constitutive of the self in a broader sense, namely, by its shaping one's character and personality in a manner analogous to the shaping that law undergoes through the precedent set by earlier court decisions. Just as a judge does not merely apply the law but to some degree makes it through judicial discretion, so too a person does not merely discover weights but assigns them; one not only weighs reasons but also weights them. Set in train is a process of building a framework for future decisions that we are tentatively committed to.

The lifelong process of self-definition in this broader sense is construed indeterministically by Nozick. The weighting is "up to us" in the sense that it is undetermined by antecedent causal factors, even though subsequent action is fully caused by the reasons one has accepted. He compares assigning weights in this deterministic sense to "the currently orthodox interpretation of quantum mechanics", following von Neumann in understanding a quantum mechanical system as in a superposition or probability mixture of states, which changes continuously in accordance with quantum mechanical equations of motion and discontinuously via measurement or observation that "collapses the wave packet" from a superposition to a particular state. Analogously, a person before decision has reasons without fixed weights: he is in a superposition of weights. The process of decision reduces the superposition to a particular state that causes action.

=== Robert Kane ===
One particularly influential contemporary theory of libertarian free will is that of Robert Kane. Kane argued that "(1) the existence of alternative possibilities (or the agent's power to do otherwise) is a necessary condition for acting freely, and that (2) determinism is not compatible with alternative possibilities (it precludes the power to do otherwise)". The crux of Kane's position is grounded not in a defense of alternative possibilities (AP) but in the notion of what Kane refers to as ultimate responsibility (UR). Thus, AP is a necessary but insufficient criterion for free will. It is necessary that there be (metaphysically) real alternatives for our actions, but that is not enough; our actions could be random without being in our control. The control is found in "ultimate responsibility".

Ultimate responsibility entails that agents must be the ultimate creators (or originators) and sustainers of their own ends and purposes. There must be more than one way for a person's life to turn out (AP). More importantly, whichever way it turns out must be based in the person's willing actions. Kane defines it as follows:

(UR) An agent is ultimately responsible for some (event or state) E's occurring only if (R) the agent is personally responsible for E's occurring in a sense which entails that something the agent voluntarily (or willingly) did or omitted either was, or causally contributed to, E's occurrence and made a difference to whether or not E occurred; and (U) for every X and Y (where X and Y represent occurrences of events and/or states) if the agent is personally responsible for X and if Y is an arche (sufficient condition, cause or motive) for X, then the agent must also be personally responsible for Y.

In short, "an agent must be responsible for anything that is a sufficient reason (condition, cause or motive) for the action's occurring."

What allows for ultimacy of creation in Kane's picture are what he refers to as "self-forming actions" or SFAs—those moments of indecision during which people experience conflicting wills. These SFAs are the undetermined, regress-stopping voluntary actions or refraining in the life histories of agents that are required for UR. UR does not require that every act done of our own free will be undetermined and thus that, for every act or choice, we could have done otherwise; it requires only that certain of our choices and actions be undetermined (and thus that we could have done otherwise), namely SFAs. These form our character or nature; they inform our future choices, reasons and motivations in action. If a person has had the opportunity to make a character-forming decision (SFA), they are responsible for the actions that are a result of their character.

==== Critique ====
Randolph Clarke objects that Kane's depiction of free will is not truly libertarian but rather a form of compatibilism. The objection asserts that although the outcome of an SFA is not determined, one's history up to the event is; so the fact that an SFA will occur is also determined. The outcome of the SFA is based on chance, and from that point on one's life is determined. This kind of freedom, says Clarke, is no different from the kind of freedom argued for by compatibilists, who assert that even though our actions are determined, they are free because they are in accordance with our own wills, much like the outcome of an SFA.

Kane responds that the difference between causal indeterminism and compatibilism is "ultimate control—the originative control exercised by agents when it is 'up to them' which of a set of possible choices or actions will now occur, and up to no one and nothing else over which the agents themselves do not also have control". UR assures that the sufficient conditions for one's actions do not lie before one's own birth.

Galen Strawson holds that there is a fundamental sense in which free will is impossible, whether determinism is true or not. He argues for this position with what he calls his "basic argument", which aims to show that no-one is ever ultimately morally responsible for their actions, and hence that no one has free will in the sense that usually concerns us.

In his book defending compatibilism, Freedom Evolves, Daniel Dennett spends a chapter criticising Kane's theory. Kane believes freedom is based on certain rare and exceptional events, which he calls self-forming actions or SFAs. Dennett notes that there is no guarantee such an event will occur in an individual's life. If it does not, the individual does not in fact have free will at all, according to Kane. Yet they will seem the same as anyone else. Dennett finds an essentially indetectable notion of free will to be incredible.

== Criticism ==
Metaphysical libertarianism has faced significant criticism from both scientific and philosophical perspectives.

One major objection comes from neuroscience. Experiments by Benjamin Libet and others suggest that the brain may initiate decisions before subjects become consciously aware of them, raising questions about whether conscious free will exists at all. Critics argue this challenges the libertarian notion of uncaused or agent-caused actions.

Another prominent critique is the "luck objection." This argument claims that if an action is not determined by prior causes, then it seems to happen by chance. In this view, libertarian freedom risks reducing choice to randomness, undermining meaningful moral responsibility.

Compatibilists, such as Daniel Dennett, argue that free will is compatible with determinism and that libertarianism wrongly assumes that causal determinism automatically negates responsibility. They maintain that what matters is whether a person's actions stem from their internal motivations—not whether those actions are ultimately uncaused.

Some philosophers also raise metaphysical concerns about agent-causation, arguing that positing the agent as a "first cause" introduces mysterious or incoherent forms of causation into an otherwise naturalistic worldview.

== See also ==
- Actual idealism
- Bayesian inference
- Benjamin Libet
- Free will theorem
- Ilya Prigogine
- Many-worlds interpretation
- Newcomb's paradox
- Philosophical zombie
- Stochastic
- Voluntarism
