= Freedom Evolves =

2003 book by Daniel C. Dennett

- Cover of the first edition
- Author: Daniel C. Dennett
- Language: English
- Subject: Free will
- Publisher: Viking Books
- Publication date: February 2003
- Publication place: United States
- Media type: Print
- ISBN: 0-670-03186-0
- Dewey Decimal: 123/.5 21
- LC Class: BJ1461 .D427 2003

Freedom Evolves is a 2003 popular science and philosophy book by Daniel C. Dennett. Dennett describes the book as an installment of a lifelong philosophical project, earlier parts of which were The Intentional Stance, Consciousness Explained, and Elbow Room. It attempts to give an account of free will and moral responsibility that is complementary to Dennett's other views on consciousness and personhood.

== Synopsis ==
As in Consciousness Explained, Dennett advertises the controversial nature of his views extensively in advance. He expects hostility from those who fear that a skeptical analysis of freedom will undermine people's belief in the reality of moral considerations; he likens himself to an interfering crow who insists on telling Dumbo he doesn't really need the feather he believes is allowing him to fly.

=== Free will and altruism ===
Dennett's stance on free will is compatibilism with an evolutionary twist – the view that, although in the strict physical sense our actions might be determined, we can still be free in all the ways that matter, because of the abilities we evolved. Free will, seen this way, is about freedom to make decisions without duress (and so is a version of Kantian positive practical free will, i.e., Kantian autonomy), as opposed to an impossible and unnecessary freedom from causality itself. To clarify this distinction, he uses the term 'evitability' (the opposite of 'inevitability'), defining it as the ability of an agent to anticipate likely consequences and act to avoid undesirable ones. Evitability is entirely compatible with, and actually requires, human action being deterministic. Dennett moves on to altruism, denying that it requires acting to the benefit of others without gaining any benefit yourself. He argues that it should be understood in terms of helping yourself by helping others, expanding the self to be more inclusive as opposed to being selfless. To show this blend, he calls such actions 'benselfish', and finds the roots of our capacity for this in the evolutionary pressures that produced kin selection. In his treatment of both free will and altruism, he starts by showing why we should not accept the traditional definitions of either term.

=== Beneficial mutual arrangements ===
Dennett also suggests that adherence to high ethical standards might pay off for the individual, because if others know your behaviour is restricted in these ways, the scope for certain beneficial mutual arrangements is enhanced. This is related to game theoretical considerations: in the famous prisoner's dilemma, 'moral' agents who cooperate will be more successful than 'non-moral' agents who do not cooperate. Cooperation wouldn't seem to naturally arise since agents are tempted to 'defect' and restore a Nash equilibrium, which is often not the best possible solution for all involved. Dennett concludes by contemplating the possibility that people might be able to opt in or out of moral responsibility: surely, he suggests, given the benefits, they would choose to opt in, especially given that opting out includes such things as being imprisoned or institutionalized.

=== Libet's experiments ===
Daniel Dennett also argues that no clear conclusion about volition can be derived from Benjamin Libet's experiments supposedly demonstrating the non-existence of conscious volition. According to Dennett, ambiguities in the timings of the different events are involved. Libet tells when the readiness potential occurs objectively, using electrodes, but relies on the subject reporting the position of the hand of a clock to determine when the conscious decision was made. As Dennett points out, this is only a report of where it seems to the subject that various things come together, not of the objective time at which they actually occur.

Suppose Libet knows that your readiness potential peaked at millisecond 6,810 of the experimental trial, and the clock dot was straight down (which is what you reported you saw) at millisecond 7,005. How many milliseconds should he have to add to this number to get the time you were conscious of it? The light gets from your clock face to your eyeball almost instantaneously, but the path of the signals from retina through lateral geniculate nucleus to striate cortex takes 5 to 10 milliseconds—a paltry fraction of the 300 milliseconds offset, but how much longer does it take them to get to you. (Or are you located in the striate cortex?) The visual signals have to be processed before they arrive at wherever they need to arrive for you to make a conscious decision of simultaneity. Libet's method presupposes, in short, that we can locate the intersection of two trajectories:

- the rising to consciousness of signals representing the decision to flick
- the rising to consciousness of signals representing successive clock-face orientations

so that these events occur side-by-side as it were in place where their simultaneity can be noted.

=== Robert Kane ===
Dennett spends a chapter criticising Robert Kane's theory of libertarian free will. Kane believes freedom is based on certain rare and exceptional events, which he calls self-forming actions or SFA's. Dennett notes that there is no guarantee such an event will occur in an individual's life. If it does not, the individual does not in fact have free will at all, according to Kane. Yet they will seem the same as anyone else. Dennett finds an essentially indetectable notion of free will to be incredible.
