= Robert Kane (philosopher) =

American philosopher (1938–2024)

- Born: Robert Hilary Kane; November 25, 1938; Boston, Massachusetts, U.S.
- Died: April 20, 2024 (aged 85); Guilford, Connecticut, U.S.

Academic background
- Education: College of the Holy Cross (BA); University of Vienna; Yale University (MA, PhD)
- Doctoral advisor: Wilfrid Sellars

Academic work
- Discipline: Philosophy; law
- School or tradition: Analytic
- Institutions: Fordham University; Haverford College; University of Texas at Austin
- Main interests: Study of free will
- Notable ideas: Metaphysical libertarianism

Robert Hilary Kane (November 25, 1938 – April 20, 2024) was an American philosopher. He was Distinguished Teaching Professor of Philosophy at the University of Texas at Austin and a professor of law at the University of Texas at Austin School of Law.

His major contributions include, Free Will and Values (1985), Through the Moral Maze (1994), and The Significance of Free Will (1996: awarded the 1996 Robert W. Hamilton Faculty Book Award). He also edited the Oxford Handbook of Free Will (2004) and published many articles in the philosophy of mind and action, ethics, the theory of values and philosophy of religion.

== Biography ==
=== Early life and education ===
Kane was born on November 25, 1938, in Boston, Massachusetts, to Hilary Thomas Kane and Vivian Lenzi Kane. Growing up in Maynard, Massachusetts, he graduated from Maynard High School. Kane then attended the College of the Holy Cross, graduating with a Bachelor of Arts in 1960. As an undergraduate at Holy Cross, he studied abroad at the University of Vienna from 1958 to 1959 and attended lectures by Viktor Frankl while there.

After graduating from Holy Cross, Kane earned his Master of Arts in philosophy in 1962 and his Ph.D. in philosophy in 1964 from Yale University. As a doctoral student at Yale, he studied under Wilfrid Sellars and Norwood Russell Hanson.

=== Career ===
Kane taught at Fordham University from 1964 to 1967, Haverford College from 1967 to 1970, and then at the University of Texas at Austin until his retirement.

== Work ==
=== Causal indeterminism ===
Kane was one of the leading contemporary philosophers on free will. Advocating what is termed within philosophical circles "libertarian freedom", Kane argues that "(1) the existence of alternative possibilities (or the agent's power to do otherwise) is a necessary condition for acting freely, and (2) determinism is not compatible with alternative possibilities (it precludes the power to do otherwise)". The crux of Kane's position is grounded not in a defense of alternative possibilities (AP) but in the notion of what Kane refers to as ultimate responsibility (UR). Thus, AP is a necessary but insufficient criterion for free will. It is necessary that there be (metaphysically) real alternatives for our actions, but that is not enough; our actions could be random without being in our control. The control is found in "ultimate responsibility".

Ultimate responsibility entails that agents must be the ultimate creators (or originators) and sustainers of their own ends and purposes. There must be more than one way for a person's life to turn out (AP). More importantly, whichever way it turns out must be based in the person's willing actions. As Kane defines it,

UR: An agent is ultimately responsible for some (event or state) E's occurring only if (R) the agent is personally responsible for E's occurring in a sense which entails that something the agent voluntarily (or willingly) did or omitted either was, or causally contributed to, E's occurrence and made a difference to whether or not E occurred; and (U) for every X and Y (where X and Y represent occurrences of events and/or states) if the agent is personally responsible for X and if Y is an arche (sufficient condition, cause or motive) for X, then the agent must also be personally responsible for Y.

In short, "an agent must be responsible for anything that is a sufficient and necessary reason (condition, cause or motive) for the action's occurring."

What allows for ultimacy of creation in Kane's picture are what he refers to as "self-forming actions" or SFAs — those moments of indecision during which people experience conflicting wills. These SFAs are the undetermined, regress-stopping voluntary actions or refrainings in the life histories of agents that are required for UR. UR does not require that every act done of our own free will be undetermined and thus that, for every act or choice, we could have done otherwise; it requires only that certain of our choices and actions be undetermined (and thus that we could have done otherwise), namely SFAs. These form our character or nature; they inform our future choices, reasons and motivations in action. If a person has had the opportunity to make a character-forming decision (SFA), he is responsible for the actions that are a result of his character.

==== Critique ====
Randolph Clarke objects that Kane's depiction of free will is not truly libertarian but rather a form of compatibilism. The objection asserts that although the outcome of an SFA is not determined, one's history up to the event is; so the fact that an SFA will occur is also determined. The outcome of the SFA is based on chance, and from that point on one's life is determined. This kind of freedom, says Clarke, is no different than the kind of freedom argued for by compatibilists, who assert that even though our actions are determined, they are free because they are in accordance with our own wills, much like the outcome of an SFA.

Kane responds that the difference between causal indeterminism and compatibilism is "ultimate control — the originative control exercised by agents when it is 'up to them' which of a set of possible choices or actions will now occur, and up to no one and nothing else over which the agents themselves do not also have control". UR assures that the sufficient conditions for one's actions do not lie before one's own birth.

In his book defending compatibilism, Freedom Evolves, Daniel Dennett spends a chapter criticising Kane's theory. Kane believes freedom is based on certain rare and exceptional events, which he calls self-forming actions or SFA's. Dennett notes that there is no guarantee such an event will occur in an individual's life. If it does not, the individual does not in fact have free will at all, according to Kane. Yet they will seem the same as anyone else. Dennett finds an essentially indetectable notion of free will to be incredible.

=== Radical libertarianism ===
Kane is one of several philosophers and scientists to propose a two-stage model of free will. The American philosopher William James was the first (in 1884). Others include the French mathematician and scientist Henri Poincaré (about 1906), the physicist Arthur Holly Compton (1931, 1955), the philosopher Karl Popper (1965, 1977), the physicist and philosopher Henry Margenau (1968, 1982), the philosopher Daniel Dennett (1978), the classicists A. A. Long and David Sedley (1987), the philosopher Alfred Mele (1995), and most recently, the neurogeneticist and biologist Martin Heisenberg (2009), son of the physicist Werner Heisenberg, whose quantum indeterminacy principle lies at the foundation of indeterministic physics.

Kane's model goes beyond Daniel Dennett's by trying to keep indeterminism as late as possible in the process of deliberation, indeed as late as the decision itself in the SFAs (Self-Forming Actions). Kane's followers, Laura Waddell Ekstrom, Richard Double, and Mark Balaguer, as well as the philosopher Peter van Inwagen, agree that chance must be the direct cause of action. This makes them all radical libertarians, as opposed to those who limit chance to the early deliberative stages of the decision process, such as James, Popper, Margenau, Doyle and Martin Heisenberg, who are conservative or modest libertarians, following the two-stage models proposed by Dennett and Mele.

In his 1985 book Free Will and Values, aware of earlier proposals by neurobiologist John Eccles, Popper, and Dennett, but working independently, Kane proposed an ambitious amplifier model for a quantum randomizer in the brain - a spinning wheel of fortune with probability bubbles corresponding to alternative possibilities, in the massive switch amplifier (MSA) tradition of Compton.

He says

What I would like to do then, is to show how an MSA model, using Eccles' notion of critically poised neurons as a working hypothesis, might be adapted to the theory of practical, moral and prudential decision making.

But Kane was not satisfied with his solution. In the end he did not endorse it. He said it did not go far enough because it does not fully capture the notion of ultimate responsibility (UR) during rare "self-forming actions (SFAs). It is merely a "significant piece in the overall puzzle of a libertarian freedom." He explains that the main reason for failure is

"locating the master switch and the mechanism of amplification ... We do not know if something similar goes on in the brains of cortically developed creatures like ourselves, but I suspect it must if libertarian theories are to succeed."

Kane admits his basic failure is his location of indeterminism in the decision process itself. This makes chance the direct cause of action. He was actually quite bleak about the possibilities for a satisfactory libertarian model. He felt

"that any construction which escaped confusion and emptiness was likely to fall short of some libertarian aspirations - aspirations that I believe cannot ultimately be fulfilled."

But Kane claims that the major criticism of all indeterminist libertarian models is explaining the power to choose or do otherwise in "exactly the same conditions," something he calls "dual rational self-control." Given that A was the rational choice, how can one defend doing B under exactly the same circumstances?" Kane is concerned that such a "dual power" is arbitrary, capricious, and irrational.

Kane's latest suggestion for his occasional self-forming actions argues that the tension and uncertainty in our minds stirs up "chaos" that is sensitive to micro-indeterminacies at the neuronal level.

All free acts do not have to be undetermined on the libertarian view, but only those acts by which we made ourselves into the kinds of persons we are, namely the "will-setting" or "self-forming actions" (SFAs) that are required for ultimate responsibility.

Now I believe these undetermined self-forming actions or SFAs occur at those difficult times of life when we are torn between competing visions of what we should do or become. Perhaps we are torn between doing the moral thing or acting from ambition, or between powerful present desires and long-term goals, or we are faced with difficult tasks for which we have aversions.

Since he is primarily interested in cases of "liberty of indifference," the strong indeterminism he introduces raise the objection of loss of agent control, but Kane says the agent can beforehand decide to assume responsibility whichever way she randomly chose. This seems more like rationalization than reason, but Kane defends it.

"Suppose we were to say to such persons: 'But look, you didn't have sufficient or conclusive prior reasons for choosing as you did since you also had viable reasons for choosing the other way.' They might reply. 'True enough. But I did have good reasons for choosing as I did, which I'm willing to stand by and take responsibility for. If these reasons were not sufficient or conclusive reasons, that's because, like the heroine of the novel, I was not a fully formed person before I chose (and still am not, for that matter). Like the author of the novel, I am in the process of writing an unfinished story and forming an unfinished character who, in my case, is myself.'"

== Death ==
Kane died on April 20, 2024, at his home in Guilford, Connecticut, following a brief illness.

== Bibliography ==
Books

- Kane, Robert Hilary: "Free Will: New Directions for an Ancient Problem" in Kane (ed.): Free Will (Blackwell, 2003).
- Kane, Robert Hilary: "Free Will: Ancient Dispute, New Themes" in Feinberg, Joel; Shafer-Landau, Russ: Reason and Responsibility: Readings in Some Basic Problems of Philosophy (Thomson Wadsworth, 2008).
- Free Will and Values. Albany: State University of New York Press. 1985.
- Through the Moral Maze: Searching for Absolute Values in a Pluralistic World. London: Paragon Press. 1994.
- The Significance of Free Will. New York: Oxford University Press. 1996.
- Oxford Handbook of Free Will, (editor) New York: Oxford University Press. 2002.
- Free Will. (editor) New York: Wiley-Blackwell. 2003.
- A Contemporary Introduction to Free Will New York: Oxford University Press. 2005.
- Four Views on Free Will, with John Martin Fischer, Derk Pereboom, and Manuel Vargas, Oxford: Blackwell. 2007.

Articles

- Kane, Robert Hilary: "Free Will: New Directions for an Ancient Problem" in Kane (ed.): Free Will (Blackwell, 2003).
- Kane, Robert Hilary: "Free Will: Ancient Dispute, New Themes" in Feinberg, Joel; Shafer-Landau, Russ: Reason and Responsibility: Readings in Some Basic Problems of Philosophy (Thomson Wadsworth, 2008).

== See also ==
- American philosophy
- Contemporary philosophy
- List of American philosophers
