= Semicompatibilism =

Semicompatibilism is the view that causal determinism is compatible with moral responsibility, while making no assertions about the truth of determinism or free will. The term was coined by John Martin Fischer.

Criticisms of this view include the principle of alternative possibilities.

== See also ==
- Compatibilism
