= John Martin Fischer =

American philosopher (born 1952)

- Born: 26 December 1952 (age 73)

Philosophical work
- Era: Contemporary philosophy
- Region: Western philosophy
- School: Analytic
- Main interests: Philosophy of action, free will, moral philosophy
- Notable ideas: Semicompatibilism

John Martin Fischer (born 26 December 1952) is an American philosopher. He is Distinguished Professor of Philosophy at the University of California, Riverside and is known for his contributions to the philosophy of free will and moral responsibility.

== Education and career ==
Fischer received his undergraduate degree from Stanford University and his Ph.D. from Cornell in 1982. He began his teaching career at Yale University, where he taught for almost a decade before joining the faculty at the University of California, Riverside. In 2017 he was appointed by the Regents of the University of California as one of 22 University Professors, becoming the first philosopher to hold the position since the program's inception.

In June 2011, Fischer was elected vice-president of the Pacific Division of the American Philosophical Association and became president of the Pacific Division in 2013. In 2024, he was elected a Fellow of the American Academy of Arts and Sciences.

== Philosophical work ==
While Fischer's work centers primarily on free will and moral responsibility, where he is particularly noted as a proponent of semicompatibilism (the idea that regardless of whether free will and determinism are compatible, moral responsibility and determinism are), he has also worked on the metaphysics of death and philosophy of religion. He led a three-year, multi-pronged research project on "immortality," funded in 2012 by the John Templeton Foundation. With a $ 5 million grant, Fischer directed scientists and theologians in the Immortality Project to research whether humans should aspire to eternal life.

== Books ==
- Moral Responsibility (editor) (Cornell University Press, 1986)
- God, Foreknowledge and Freedom (editor) (Stanford University Press, 1989)
- Perspectives on Moral Responsibility (co-editor with Ravizza) (Cornell University Press, 1993)
- The Metaphysics of Death (editor) (Stanford University Press, 1993)
- The Metaphysics of Free Will: An Essay on Control (Blackwell, 1994)
- Responsibility and Control: A Theory of Moral Responsibility (co-authored with Ravizza) (Cambridge University Press, 1998)
- My Way: Essays on Moral Responsibility (Oxford University Press, 2006)
- Our Stories: Essays on Life, Death, and Free Will (Oxford University Press, 2009)
- Fischer, John Martin; Mitchell-Yellin, Benjamin (2016). Near-Death Experiences: Understanding Visions of the Afterlife. Oxford University Press. ISBN 978-0-19-046660-2.
- Fischer, John Martin (2020). Death, Immortality, and Meaning in Life. Oxford University Press. ISBN 978-0-19-092114-9.
- Cave, Stephen; Fischer, John Martin (2023). Should You Choose to Live Forever? A Debate. Routledge. doi:10.4324/9781003105442. ISBN 978-0-367-61540-6.

== See also ==
- American philosophy
- List of American philosophers
