= Idappaccayatā =

Translations of idappaccayatā
- English: specific conditionality, this/that conditionality, convergence of conditional factors, this conditionedness
- Sanskrit: idaṃpratyayatā, idampratyayata
- Pali: idappaccayatā, idappaccayata
- Japanese: 此縁性 (Rōmaji: shienshō)

Idappaccayatā (Pali, also idappaccayata; Sanskrit: idaṃpratyayatā) is a Buddhist term that is translated as "specific conditionality" or "this/that conditionality". It refers to the principle of causality: that all things arise and exist due to certain causes (or conditions), and cease once these causes (or conditions) are removed. This principle is expressed in the following simple formula that is repeated hundreds of times in the Buddhist discourses:

When this is, that is.
From the arising of this comes the arising of that.
When this isn't, that isn't.
From the cessation of this comes the cessation of that.

Idappaccayatā (specific conditionality), as expressed in the above formula, is identified as a key expression of the doctrine of pratītyasamutpāda (dependent origination).

== Etymology ==
The Pali term idappaccayatā, is composed of three Pali words: ida, paccaya and tā. Translator Patrick Kearney explains these terms as follows: (Note: This is how I heard it, by Patrick Kearney)

Paccaya is derived from the verb pacceti ([...] “come back to,” fig. “fall back on,” “find one’s hold in”). Literally meaning “support,” its applied meaning is “reason, cause, ground, condition.” The other parts of the compound are: ida, which means “this;” and the abstract suffix - tā.

Ven. Dhammanando provides the following explanation: (Note: Pali Term: Idappaccayatā)

Idappaccayatā [equals] idaṃ + paccaya + tā.

‘Idaṃ’ means ‘this’, being the neuter nominative or accusative singular of the adjective/pronoun ‘ima’. However, when ‘idaṃ’ occurs in a compound word, with elision of the niggahīta, it may stand for any of the oblique cases of ‘ima’. Here it is understood by the commentators to stand for ‘imesaṃ’, the genitive plural — ‘of these’.

‘Paccaya’ [equals] ‘paccayā’ (nominative plural) — conditions.

The suffix ‘-tā’ forms a noun of state, like the English ‘-ness’.

Literally: “conditions-of-these-ness”

== Alternate translations ==
The following English terms are used as translations for this term:

- Causality (Ajahn Brahmavamso)
  - Specific causality - U Thittila (Book of Analysis)
  - Specifically assignable causality - Pe Maung Tin (The Expositor)
- Conditionality - Jeffrey Hopkins (Tibetan, Sanskrit, English Dictionary)
  - This/that conditionality - Thanissaro Bhikkhu
  - Specific conditionality - Ajahn Payutto; Bodhi/Ñāṇamoli (Connected Discourses, Middle Length Discourses etc.)
- Convergence of conditional factors - Ajahn Payutto
- Having just these conditions - Jeffrey Hopkins
- The conditioned nature of things - Maurice Walshe (Long Discourses)
- This conditioned-ness - Patrick Kearney

== Expression of pratītyasamutpāda ==
Idappaccayatā (this/that conditionality), as expressed in the this/that formula, is identified as a key expression of the doctrine of pratītyasamutpāda (dependent origination). (Note: The this/that formula is considered to represent a key expression of pratītyasamutpāda (interdependent origination))

- Thich Nhat Hanh states: "The Buddha expressed interdependent co-arising very simply: "This is, because that is. This is not, because that is not. This comes to be, because that comes to be. This ceases to be, because that ceases to be." These sentences occur hundreds of times in both the Northern and Southern transmissions. They are the Buddhist genesis."
- Peter Harvey states: In its abstract form, the doctrine states: "That being, this comes to be; from the arising of that, this arises; that being absent, this is not; from the cessation of that, this ceases." (S.II.28) This states the principle of conditionality, that all things, mental and physical, arise and exist due to the presence of certain conditions, and cease once their conditions are removed: nothing (except Nibbana) is independent.
- Christina Feldman states: "The basic principle of dependent origination is simplicity itself. The Buddha described it by saying: 'When there is this, that is. / With the arising of this, that arises. / When this is not, neither is that. / With the cessation of this, that ceases.' When all of these cycles of feeling, thought, bodily sensation, all of these cycles of mind and body, action, and movement, are taking place upon a foundation of ignorance — that’s called samsara. (Note: Feldman, Christina. "Dependent Origination," http://www.dharma.org/ij/archives/1999a/christina.htm. Accessed 25 February 2011.)
- Joseph Goldstein states: "At the heart of his teaching is the principle of dependent origination: because of this, that arises; when this ceases, that also ceases. The law of dependent origination is central to understanding not only the arising of our precious human birth, but also the unfolding process of life itself, in all its pain and beauty."
- Rupert Gethin: "Another succinct formula states the principle of causality (idaṃpratyayatā) as ‘this existing, that exists; this arising, that arises; this not existing, that does not exist; this ceasing, that ceases’. (Majjhima Nikāya iii. 63; Samyutta Nikāya v. 387; etc.) ...the succinct formula state[s] baldly that the secret of the universe lies in the nature of causality — the way one thing leads to another.

=== Equivalence to pratītyasamutpāda ===
Ajahn Payutto describes idappaccayatā as another name for pratītyasamutpāda. (Note: Significance of Dependent Origination, by Ajahn Payutto) Ajahn Payutto provides the following quote from the Pali sutta S. II. 25-6:

Whether Tathāgatas arise or not, that principle of specific conditionality [idappaccayatā] is constant, certain and a law of nature. Having fully awakened to and penetrated to this truth, a Tathāgata announces it, teaches it, clarifies it, formulates it, reveals it, and analyzes it. And he says: ‘See! With ignorance as condition, there are volitional formations.... Thus, bhikkhus, this actuality (tathatā), this inerrancy (avitathatā), this invariability (anaññathatā) — this specific conditionality (idappaccayatā) — this is called dependent origination.

=== Direct experience ===
The Access to Insight glossary emphasizes that idappaccayatā relates to direct experience. The glossary states: (Note: Access to Insight glossary)

This name for the causal principle the Buddha discovered on the night of his Awakening stresses the point that, for the purposes of ending suffering and stress, the processes of causality can be understood entirely in terms of forces and conditions that are experienced in the realm of direct experience, with no need to refer to forces operating outside of that realm.

== This/that formula ==
=== Translations of this/that formula ===
There are many translations of the idappaccayatā formula by contemporary scholars and translators.

Contemporary translator Thanissaro Bikkhu provides the following translation: (Note: Bhikkhu Thanissaro, Assutavā Sutta: Uninstructed (SN 12.61), Access To Insight, accessdate=5 June 2013)

When this is, that is.
From the arising of this comes the arising of that.
When this isn't, that isn't.
From the cessation of this comes the cessation of that.

Rupert Gethin translates it as follows:

This existing, that exists;
this arising, that arises;
this not existing, that does not exist;
this ceasing, that ceases’.

(Majjhima Nikāya iii. 63; Samyutta Nikāya v. 387; etc.)

=== Analysis ===
Thanissaro Bhikkhu analyzes the meaning of the this/that formula as follows: (Note: Wings to Awakening, Introduction)

The Buddha expressed this/that conditionality in a simple-looking formula:

(1) When this is, that is.
(2) From the arising of this comes the arising of that.
(3) When this isn't, that isn't.
(4) From the stopping of this comes the stopping of that.

— AN 10.92

There are many possible ways of interpreting this formula, but only one does justice both to the way the formula is worded and to the complex, fluid manner in which specific examples of causal relationships are described in the Canon. That way is to view the formula as the interplay of two causal principles, one linear and the other synchronic, that combine to form a non-linear pattern. The linear principle — taking (2) and (4) as a pair — connects events, rather than objects, over time; the synchronic principle — (1) and (3) — connects objects and events in the present moment. The two principles intersect, so that any given event is influenced by two sets of conditions: input acting from the past and input acting from the present. Although each principle seems simple, the fact that they interact makes their consequences very complex.

== Sources ==
- Gethin, Rupert (1998), Foundations of Buddhism, Oxford University Press
- Goldstein, Joseph (2002), One Dharma: The Emerging Western Buddhism, HarperCollins
- Harvey, Peter (1990), An Introduction to Buddhism, Cambridge University Press
- Thich Nhat Hanh (1999), The Heart of the Buddha's Teaching, Three River Press
- Williams, Paul (2002), Buddhist Thought, Taylor & Francis, Kindle Edition
