= Elbow Room (Dennett book) =

1984 book by Daniel Dennett

Elbow Room: The Varieties of Free Will Worth Wanting
- Author: Daniel C. Dennett
- Language: English
- Genre: Philosophy
- Publisher: The MIT Press
- Publication date: 1984, 2015 (new edition)
- Publication place: Cambridge, Massachusetts
- Pages: 227 (new edition)

Elbow Room: The Varieties of Free Will Worth Wanting is a 1984 book by the philosopher Daniel Dennett in which the author argues for a compatibilist conception of free will. Based on the John Locke Lectures that Dennett presented in 1983, it is his third book.

Dennett's professed goal is to reclaim a common-sense conception of free will without appeal to any "dubious" metaphysics. He wants to show our common-sense conception of free will is generally compatible with a view of ourselves as purely physical, biological organisms, and that the fact that this is our nature should not lead us to draw radical conclusions about our status as agents. In his words, “the common wisdom about our place in the universe is roughly right. We do have free will. We can have free will and science too.”

== Reception ==
The philosopher Peter Van Inwagen stated in his review of the book that "despite its considerable merits, Elbow Room has nothing to tell us about whether the thesis that we are morally accountable for the results of our acts is compatible with the thesis that those acts and their results are logical consequences of the laws of nature and certain propositions about the remote past."

Gary Watson found the book's style engaging and its writing "generally well informed", though overall, "So much remains sketchy that it is often difficult to appraise the result."

In the evaluation of David H. Sandford, Dennett's critique of one variety of free will as not worth wanting failed to establish its conclusion. However, Sandford concluded that overall, Dennett's project of delineating kinds of free will and "finding fresh reasons why some are or are not worth wanting" was a worthwhile one to continue.

== Editions ==
- Dennett, Daniel (2015). Elbow Room: The Varieties of Free Will Worth Wanting. The MIT Press. https://doi.org/10.2307/2215460.
