= Copyright infringement and social media =

Copyright infringement in social media involves the use of social media platforms to distribute copyrighted material illegally, thus copyright infringement.

== Background ==
Content posted to social media platforms located in the United States is regulated by the Digital Millennium Copyright Act, a foundational federal statute absolving social media companies from liability for content posted on their platforms if they make a reasonable effort to remove violative content. Additionally, social media companies are protected by Section 230 of the Communications Decency Act; Section 230 does not provide legal protection for copyrighted content.

=== History ===
Under Elon Musk, several recent films have been illegally rerecorded and posted to Twitter, including Avatar: The Way of Water (2022), The Super Mario Bros. Movie (2023), Shrek the Third (2007), The Flash (2023), and Top Gun: Maverick (2022).

== Film and television industry ==
Social media platforms have been used as vectors to host film and television episodes. A report from Business Insider released in 2018 found multiple groups, some with upwards of tens of thousands of members, hosting copies of films directly onto Facebook, including The Greatest Showman (2017), Transformers: The Last Knight (2017), and cam copies of Ant-Man and the Wasp (2018). Facebook told Business Insider that it would not take down the groups, stating that the responsibility of taking down the content is the responsibility of the rights holder.

Segments from films and television episodes have been repackaged on TikTok, resulting in a renaissance for older television series and films such as Temple Grandin (2010), The Good Doctor, and Malcolm in the Middle. The phenomenon has also benefited newer films and television series; a single clip from Fall (2022) attracted over one hundred million views on TikTok, while a leak of HBO's revival of Clone High received significant attention on the platform. TikTok users organically promoted the reality hoax sitcom Jury Duty that received limited attention.

Distributors have utilized social media to promote their own television series, such as Peacock's Killing It and Bupkis. In 2021, HBO Max released free episodes of several television series on the service on Snapchat, including the Gossip Girl reboot, The Flight Attendant, Lovecraft Country, and Game of Thrones. Apple TV+ released the first episode of Silo onto Twitter after the service allowed longer videos; Twitter chief executive Elon Musk praised the decision. Paramount Pictures uploaded the entirety of Mean Girls (2004) onto TikTok in October 2023.

For the 2023 New Zealand general election, the Green Party used footage from Barbie (2023) to criticize the National and Labour parties. The Green Party confirmed that they did not have copyright permission from Warner Bros. The Green Party later removed these videos due to copyright violations. They have not commented on whether this decision was made due to request by Warner Bros.

=== Sludge content ===
The use of copyrighted material on TikTok has resulted in a form of media known as "sludge content", which features attention-grabbing content alongside copyrighted material. The 2012 endless runner mobile game Subway Surfers and the adult animated television series Family Guy are commonly included. The concept of sludge content originates with methods used to subvert copyright detection tools, particularly on Family Guy compilations on YouTube. Editing techniques such as frequent jump cuts, unrelated clips, and cropping have increased the longevity of copyright violating videos on YouTube. TikTok users have additionally used the format to splice TikTok videos made by other users.

== Music industry ==
The Russian social media platform VK has been noted for being a "notorious marketplace" for music piracy since 2010, according to the Office of the United States Trade Representative. The Recording Industry Association of America and International Federation of the Phonographic Industry chief executive Frances Moore have spoken out against music piracy on VK. In December 2013, VK founder Pavel Durov stated that he would abide by takedown requests. Sony Music Russia, Universal Music Russia, and Warner Music UK filed separate lawsuits against VK in Saint Petersburg and Leningrasky Region Arbitration Court in April 2014 seeking US$1.4 million in damages.

Former U.S. president Donald Trump's use of copyrighted music in his presidential campaigns has resulted in multiple lawsuits. In 2020, Eddy Grant sued Trump for using "Electric Avenue" in a campaign video. During the 2014 New Zealand general election, the National Party illegally used Eminem's "Lose Yourself". The party was ordered to pay NZ$225,000 in 2018.

== User content ==
United States District Court for the Southern District of New York judge Alison Nathan ruled in January 2013 that Agence France-Presse (AFP) and The Washington Post infringed on freelance photojournalist Daniel Morel's copyright by reuploading an image Morel had posted to Twitter of the 2010 Haiti earthquake. In Agence France Presse v. Morel (2010), AFP argued that Twitter's terms of service allowed the agency to reuse the photo and upload it to Getty Images, where The Washington Post used four of Morel's photographs. The press outlets would have been able to use the photographs if it was embedded within their articles.

== Preventive measures ==
In April 2016, Facebook released Rights Manager, a tool allowing rights holders to identify copyrighted content. Rights Manager was expanded in April 2017 to automatically block content, monitor video metrics, and receive a portion of the video's revenue if it has advertisements attached to it. The company acquired the video detection company Source3 in July 2017.

== Analysis ==
Cornell University behavioral scientist Gordon Pennycook stated that the choice to watch media on TikTok mirrored consumer habits of "constant stimulation".
