= Dakine =

American outdoor clothing company

- Founded: Haiku, Maui, Hawaii (1979)
- Founder: Rob Kaplan
- Headquarters: Torrance, California, United States
- Area served: Worldwide
- Products: Sportswear and Sports equipment
- Parent: Marquee Brands

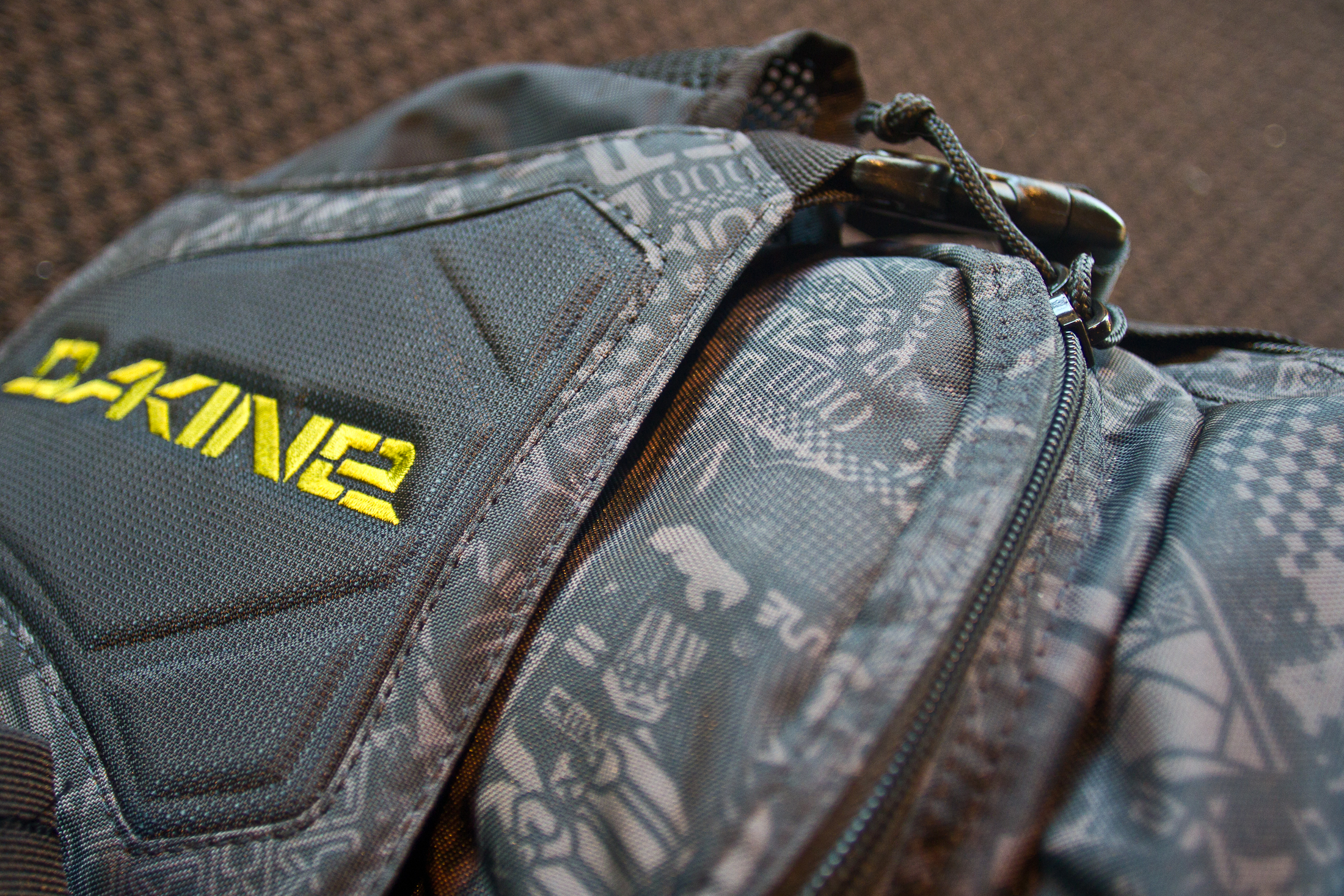
The DaKine Nomad 18-liter hydration backpack.

Dakine is an American outdoor clothing company specializing in sportswear and sports equipment for adventure sports. Founded in Hawaii, the name comes from the Hawaiian Pidgin phrase "da kine" (derived from "the kind"). While based in Hood River, Oregon (products are manufactured overseas), the company also sponsors athletes from the lifestyle and sporting fields of skiing, snowboarding, mountain biking, surfing, windsurfing, kiteboarding, and skateboarding. The company has since abandoned operations in Oregon and moved its headquarters to Torrance, California.

== History ==
The company was founded in 1979 in Haiku, Maui, Hawaii, by Rob Kaplan. In 1986, Dakine moved its base of operations to Hood River, Oregon. In August 2009, Dakine was acquired by Billabong International Limited. for about US$100 million. The company moved into a new 2300 m^{2} (25000 ft^{2}) headquarters along the Columbia River in Hood River in June 2013. Also in 2013, Billabong sold Dakine for $70 million to Altamont Capital Partners. As of 2018, Dakine had offices in Los Angeles, California; Hood River, Oregon; and Annecy, France. In 2020, Dakine laid off most of its employees in Hood River and moved its headquarters to Torrance, California, ending its presence in Oregon.

== Products ==
Dakine sells backpacks, clothing, outerwear, luggage, and accessories for men, women, and children.

== Social compliance standard ==
The company has adopted the social compliance standard "Social Accountability International's SA8000"—the standard "is based on the primary international workplace rights contained within the International Labour Organisation conventions, the Universal Declaration of Human Rights and the UN Convention on the Rights of the Child."

== See also ==
- List of companies based in Oregon
