= Twinkle Borge =

Hawaiian activist (1969–2024)

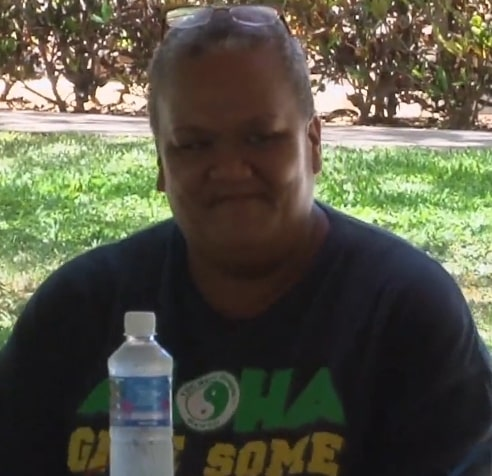
- Borge in 2017
- Born: Twinkle Alohalani Borge; September 15, 1969; Honolulu, Hawaii, U.S.
- Died: August 5, 2024 (aged 54); Waianae, Hawaii, U.S.
- Occupation: Activist
- Known for: Matriarch of Pu'uhonua o Wai'anae

Twinkle Alohalani Borge (September 15, 1969 – August 5, 2024) was an American activist based in Hawaii who was involved with Hawaii's largest homeless encampment, Pu'uhonua o Wai'anae ("The Village"). This 20-acre property is in the back of Waianae Valley to "provide shelter, stability, and hope for up to 300 people at a lower development cost and lower operating costs and rents than conventional affordable housing." In 2020, fundraising was completed to purchase the land, and current efforts are focused to continue building the structures.

Borge was known for her work and activism at "The Harbor" located at the edge of the Waianae Boat Harbor on the leeward side of Oahu.

== Early life ==
Twinkle Alohalani Borge was born in Honolulu on September 15, 1969, and was a native Hawaiian. She stated that her first name, Twinkle, was not a nickname but was chosen by her older sister.

== Homelessness and activism ==
Borge herself lived in the camp for more than 15 years. According to an interview with Honolulu Civil Beat, Borge arrived in 2006 and "...had for years been the undisputed leader of The Harbor, organizing a governance structure that includes a second-in-command and section captains. In her role as the leader of the village, she selected 'captains' from the community to help with the camp's daily operations.

In order to avoid sweeps or clearances of the village, Borge liaised with the state government which owns the land on which the homeless camp is located. In 2018, Borge and others led an effort to defend the village from eviction. In 2020, the village managed to purchase 20 acres of land in order to build more permanent housing. This purchase was facilitated by Cades Shutte LLC.

== Death ==
Borge died in Waianae, Hawaii on August 5, 2024, at age 54. State of Hawaii governor Josh Green released a statement praising Borge as an "incredible inspiration to so many".

== Honors and awards ==
- In 2021, Borge was the recipient of the Hookele Award which honors leaders from the nonprofit sector.
- On August 21, 2021, Borge received the Ulu Hana: Pewa Award from the Partners In Development Foundation in recognition of "individual leaders who have made a significant difference in addressing and supporting critical community needs or challenges within the state of Hawaii".
- In 2023, Borge was included in the list of Hawaii's Women of Influence by Hawaii Business magazine.
