= Bible translations into the languages of Hawaii =

There are biblical translations into Hawaiian and Hawaii Pidgin which are the two main languages of Hawaii.

== Hawaiian ==
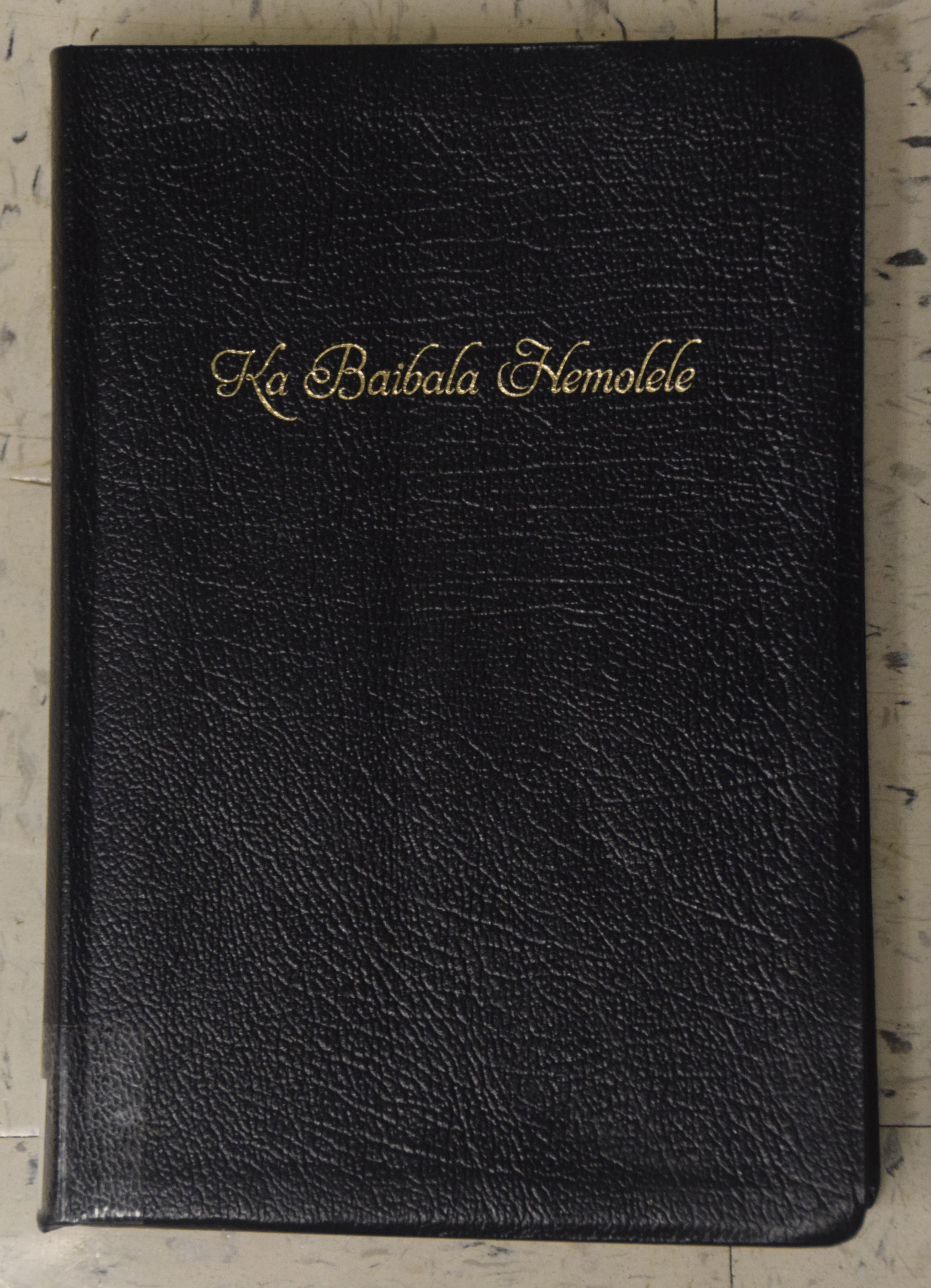
Ka Baibala Hemolele (the Holy Bible), the Hawaiian language Bible (as re-published in 2018)

A Hawaiian language translation was completed by New England Christian missionaries including Reverends Hiram Bingham, Asa Thurston, Lorrin Andrews, and Sheldon Dibble from 1800-1850. The Gospels (Matthew, Mark, Luke, and John) were translated in 1828. The rest of the New Testament was translated in 1832, the Old Testament was translated in 1839, and the translation was revised in 1868.

As recent research indicated, 25% of this version of the Bible was translated by Thurston, 20% by Bingham (who also did the coordination), 14% by Artemas Bishop (who later became a prominent missionary to Honolulu and was responsible for the first revision), and the rest by others.

As the Kingdom of Hawaii was toppled in the 1893 overthrow and became a United States territory, the Hawaiian language was banned in schools and was spoken less. However, in the second half of the 20th century, there was a Hawaiian language revitalization in which people became more interested in the native language, and more parents started to send their children to Hawaiian language immersion schools.

In the early 21st century, under the Hawaiian Bible Project supported by Partners In Development Foundation, the Hawaiian Bible called Ka Baibala Hemolele (the Holy Bible) was published in 2018 in print and electronic forms, using the Hawaiian text of the 19th century, but re-edited in modern Hawaiian orthography, using the diacritical marks, such as ʻOkina and Kahakō.

== Hawaii Pidgin ==
Da Jesus Book: Hawaii Pidgin New Testament
- Language: Hawaiian Pidgin
- Subject: Christianity
- Publisher: Wycliffe Bible Translators
- Publication date: July 2000
- Publication place: United States
- ISBN: 978-0-938978-21-3

The modern Hawaiian Pidgin English is to be distinguished from the indigenous Hawaiian language.

Da Jesus Book: Hawaii Pidgin New Testament is a translation of the New Testament into Hawaiian Pidgin. The book is 752 pages long, and was published by Wycliffe Bible Translators in 2000. It was translated by retired Cornell University linguistics professor Joseph Grimes, who worked on it with 27 pidgin speakers for 12 years.

Subsequently, translation of the Old Testament commenced. In 2015, the Old Testament translation was roughly half completed, and in 2020, the translation was completed.

The combined Old and New Testaments are called Da Good An Spesho Book.

== Comparison ==
Translation	John 3:16
Ke Kauoha Hou (1839, 1868 & 1994)	No ka mea, ua aloha nui mai ke Akua i ko ke ao nei, nolaila, ua haawi mai oia i kana Keiki hiwahiwa, i ole e make ka mea manaoio ia ia, aka, e loaa ia ia ke ola mau loa.
Da Good An Spesho Book	God wen get so plenny love an aloha fo da peopo inside da world, dat he wen send me, his one an ony Boy, so dat everybody dat trus me no get cut off from God, but get da real kine life dat stay to da max foeva.

== See also ==
- Hawaiian religion
