= Japanese loanwords in Hawaii =

Loanwords from the Japanese language in Hawaiʻi appear in various parts of the culture. Many loanwords in Hawaiian Pidgin (or Hawaiian Creole English) derive from the Japanese language. The linguistic influences of the Japanese in Hawaiʻi began with the first immigrants from Japan in 1868 and continues with the large Japanese American population in Hawaiʻi today.

== Background ==
There are other Japanese words common among the Japanese American population (such as "okazu" and "obaachan"), but not as well known among Hawaiʻi's general population. Such words have not been included here, nor have Japanese words which have entered the English language on a national level, such as "anime" (アニメ), "karaoke" (カラオケ), "samurai" (侍), and "sushi" (寿司). Hawaiʻi is also unique in the United States in that Japanese loanwords often retain Japanese pronunciation, as in the tapped "r" sound even in words that have entered the American English dictionary such as "karaoke" and "karate."

However, as several varieties of Japanese cultural influence in the US in general has increased over the years, it has further bolstered the uses of Japanese terminology in Hawaiʻi. Japanese food has increased in popularity and availability, most notably in the history of sushi in the US and Top Ramen, plus in the 21st century, ramen restaurants. Poke restaurants, centered around the Hawaiian dish, also have food with Japanese influences. Another variety of cultural influence has been the increasing fandom and availability of anime and manga as early as the 1980s with that era's Viz Japanese comics in English and Mangajin magazine. This fandom brought in the name "cosplay" and expanded its practice in a wider audience.

Some words are not from the standard Japanese language. They instead originated from Japan's regional dialects. For example, the word "bobora" is said to be spoken only in certain prefectures, especially in western Japan where many of the Japanese immigrants came from. It originates from the Portuguese word abóbora meaning Japanese pumpkin.

== Food ==
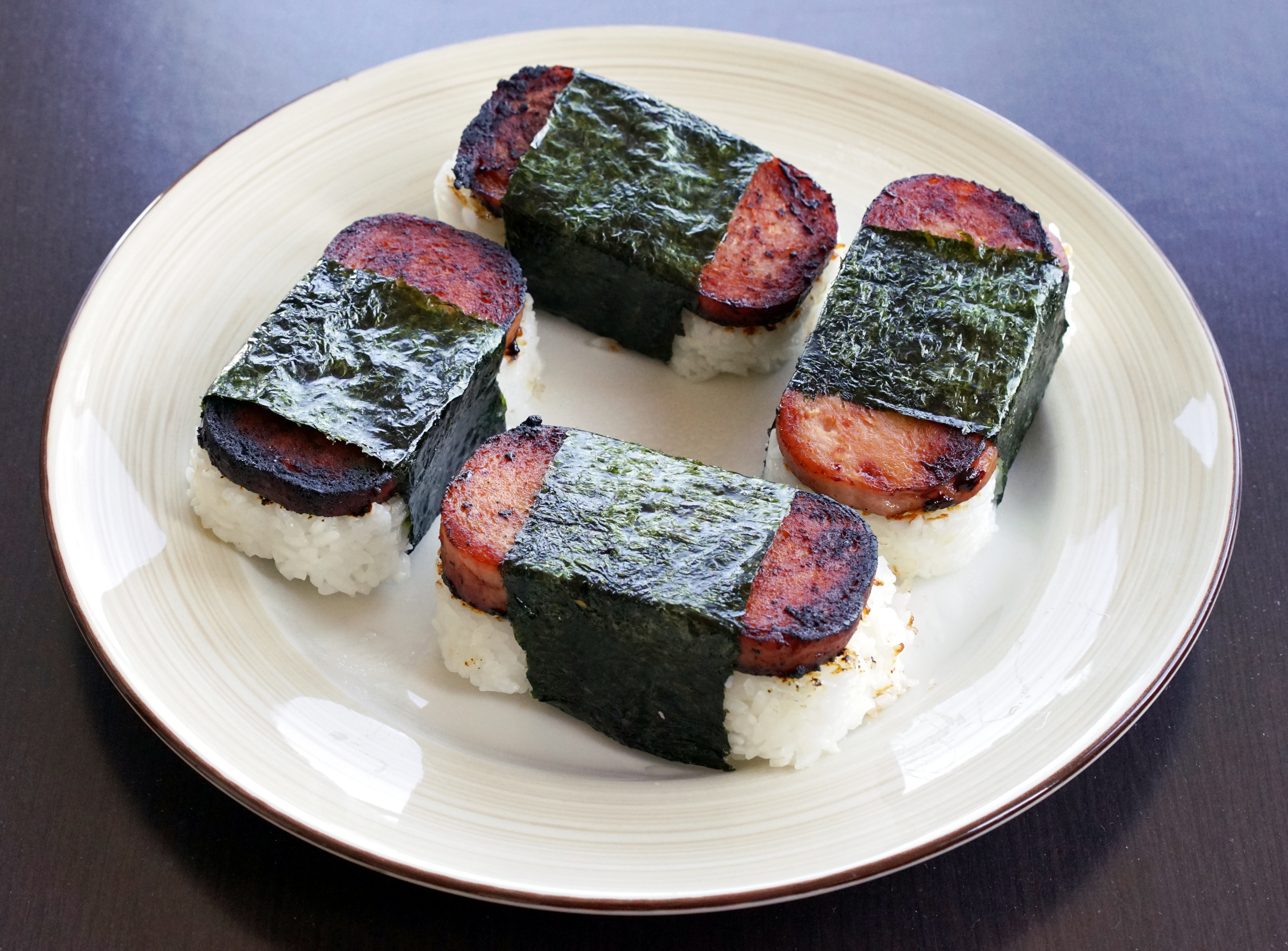
Spam musubi made from SPAM. (see definition for "musubi" below).

- Anpan (ja:あんパン, 餡パン): A sweet bread filled with azuki bean paste and sprinkled on top with sesame seeds. Usually larger than the Japanese variety.
- Bentō (ja:弁当, べんとう): Box lunch geared for portability for picnics, etc. It typically has rice, a main dish of meat or fish, and side dishes. It used to be food on a paper plate placed inside a thin cardboard box. Now, it's all in convenient styrofoam containers molded for each dish.
- Furikake: A seaweed and sesame seed based condiment commonly used to season rice.
- Manjū (ja:饅頭): Confection with sweet azuki bean paste inside a flour-based outside.
- Miso soup (ja:味噌汁): Soup made of fermented soybean paste called miso. Miso-shiru in Japanese.
- Mochi (ja:餅): Rice cake made of a special kind of rice that has been pounded into a sticky mass. Mochi may be sweetened or unsweetened. Commonly pounded and eaten during New Year's, as in Japan. Sweetened azuki beans are commonly included with mochi as part of a confection.

- Mochi crunch: Rice crackers seasoned with shoyu. Also called "kaki mochi". Called arare in standard Japanese.
- Mochi ice cream: Ice cream coated with a thin layer of frozen mochi.

- Musubi: Rice triangle wrapped in dried seaweed; may or may not have something in the middle, like a pickled ume or bits of fish. Spam musubi has a piece of SPAM luncheon meat on top. In Japanese the word onigiri is more commonly used for rice balls.
- Shoyu (ja:醤油): Soy sauce. "Shoyu rice" is "soy sauce" sprinkled over rice. "Shoyu x" is some ingredient x cooked in soy sauce, e.g. "Shoyu chicken", "shoyu pork", "shoyu tofu". This term is so widely used that most Hawaii residents are unaware that is not the widely used English language term for soy sauce.
- Sukiyaki (ja:すき焼き): Thin slices of beef, vegetables, and tofu simmered in a skillet or pan in sukiyaki sauce. (It is also the title of a No. 1 hit song in the U.S. made popular by Kyu Sakamoto in 1963. The Japanese title of the song is "Ue o muite arukō"—it has nothing to do with the food product.)
- Teriyaki (ja:照り焼き): Grilled meat basted with a sauce made of shoyu and sugar. Meat words such as "chicken" are often appended. A common dish in plate lunches. Often shortened to "teri", e.g. "teri burger".
- Tako (ja:タコ): Octopus. Often used in a local dish called poke /poʊˈkeɪ/ in which case it is called "tako poke".

== Objects ==
- Benjo (ja:便所): Toilet, interchangeable with Hawaiian-derived lua. Although originally a Japanese word with no particular connotation, in Japan, it is now considered to be crude, and many Japanese people find this term offensive. (See also: Japanese toilet).
- Bobora: A country hick fresh off the boat from Japan. Also called "Japan bobora". Originally from a regional Japanese dialect, based on the Portuguese word abóbora, meaning a Japanese squash.
- Boro boros: Dirty clothes, rags. Old clothes worn for activities like house painting, car repair, etc.
- Chawan cut: A hairstyle that was common among little Japanese girls. It looked like someone put a bowl (茶碗, chawan) over the head and cut around the rim. In Japanese, it is called okappa, after the Japanese mythological creature called kappa which sports a similar haircut.
- Daikon legs: Daikon (ja:ダイコン or 大根) are large white radishes having a stubby shape. The term refers to Japanese women's legs which seem short and stubby. This is rumored to be the result of sitting on the floor for long periods. The Japanese equivalent is daikon ashi.
- Giri-giri: The cowlick. Giri giri is an onomatopoeic word with a different meaning in standard Japanese. This use of the word originates from local dialects spoken in mainly western Japan where it means tsumuji, the standard Japanese word for the cowlick.
- Hanakuso: Dried nasal mucus. Hana means nose, and kuso means waste. Kuso in Japanese typically refers to human excrement. This compound is also found in standard Japanese.
- Hanabuddah (or hanabata): The fluid version of hanakuso. Bata is from English "butter". The term in Japanese is usually hanamizu ("nose water").
- Hanabuddah days: Hanabuddah is most commonly seen on young children who neglect to wipe their runny noses. Thus, hanabuddah days refers to one's youth in Hawaiʻi.
- Hashi (also ohashi): Chopsticks, as in Japanese.
- "Kikaida": After the television series of the same name become enormously popular in Hawaiʻi, "Kikaida" became a generic name for children's shows featuring superheroes.
- Shishi: Urine or urination, used in "go shishi" or "make shishi". The Double-Tongued Dictionary gives three possible etymologies for "shishi": imitative from the sound of urinating, Japanese reduplicated shi from shiko "urinate" (sic., probably shito 尿 "urine"), or Portuguese xixi "urinate". There is a Japanese kanji joke based on 五-四-四 "5-4-4", which can be read go-shi-shi in Japanese. Thus, “I gotta five-four-four” is a Pidgin euphemism for "I gotta go shishi".
- Zori: Rubber thonged slippers, often called flip-flops in the continental U.S. Also zoris (plural). Synonymous with "slippers" or "slippahs". From the Japanese word zori (ja:草履). Called "beach sandal" (ja:ビーチサンダル) in standard Japanese.

== Miscellaneous ==
- Bakatare: Fool, idiot, nimrod. Originates from Hakata dialect.
- Bocha: Take a bath. Originally from bocha-bocha Japanese onomatopoeia for splashing noises.
- Bon dance (ja:盆踊り): From the Japanese Bon Festival. An annual summer dance held outside at Buddhist temples to greet the returning souls of the deceased. They dance in a circle around a tower where people sing and beat taiko drums. The most famous bon dance song is "Tankō Bushi" (炭坑節).
- Buddhahead: Hawaii person of Japanese descent. In this context, “Buddha” is likely a corruption of Japanese “豚 (buta)”, meaning “pig”.
- Doo itashimashite: You're welcome, from Japanese どう致しまして (dō itashimashite).
- Habut/Habuteru: To feel grumpy or resentful, especially after feeling offended by something. Not standard Japanese but from Hiroshima dialect.
- Jan ken po: The children's game of rock (fist), paper (open hand), and scissors (peace sign). In Japanese, either jan ken or jan ken pon. The Japanese also do not say the prelude as used in Hawaiʻi ("janken na manken an saka saka po ...") before they show their hands. This jan-ken-po prelude can also differ depending on the island and is mainly used by children.
- Katonk: a Japanese-American from the US mainland.
- Shibai: A false act. Often refers to politicians or other influential persons who put on a false face. From the Japanese word shibai, meaning "a (theatre) play."
- Skebe: Horny. From Japanese sukebe. In Japanese, "H" (ecchi) is used for the same purpose, and sukebe refers to a pervert.
- Skosh: Just a little. From Japanese sukoshi "a little".

== See also ==
- Japanese language
- Japanese phonology, especially the devoiced vowels, e.g., at times for shi and su
- Romanization of Japanese
- Transcription into Japanese
- Japanese language and computers
- Japanese language education
- Okinawan Japanese, a variant of Standard Japanese influenced by the Ryukyuan languages
