= Bullshit =

Vulgar term for nonsense

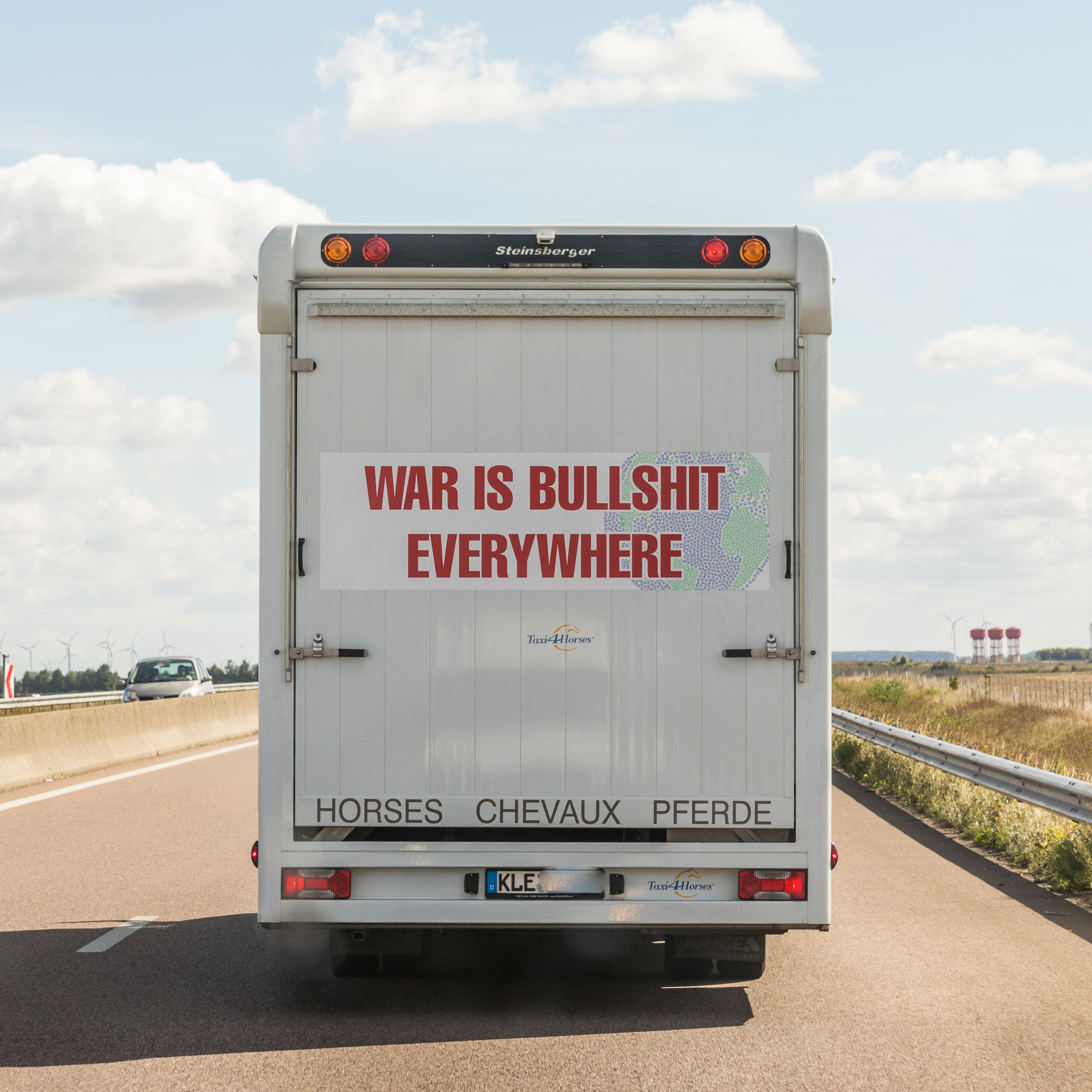
A horse trailer with the words "War is bullshit everywhere"

Bullshit (sometimes bullshite or bullcrap) is a common English expletive which means "nonsense", especially as a rebuke in response to communication or actions viewed as deceptive, misleading, disingenuous, unfair or false. Mostly a slang term and a profanity, it may be shortened to the euphemism bull or the initialism B.S.. In British English, "bollocks" is a comparable expletive. As with many expletives, the term can be used as an interjection, or as many other parts of speech, and can carry a wide variety of meanings. A person who excels at communicating nonsense on a given subject is sometimes referred to as a "bullshit artist" instead of a "liar".

In philosophy and psychology of cognition, the term "bullshit" is sometimes used to specifically refer to statements produced without particular concern for truth, clarity, or meaning, distinguishing "bullshit" from a deliberate, manipulative lie intended to subvert the truth. In business and management, guidelines for comprehending, recognizing, acting on and preventing bullshit are proposed for stifling the production and spread of this form of misrepresentation in the workplace, media and society. Within organizations, bullshitting is considered to be a social practice that people engage with to become part of a speech community, to get things done in that community, and to reinforce their identity. Research has also produced the Organizational Bullshit Perception Scale that reveals three factors of organizational bullshit (regard for truth, the boss, and bullshit language) that can be used to gauge perceptions of the extent of organizational bullshit that exists in a workplace.

The word is generally used in a depreciatory sense, but it may imply a measure of respect for language skills or frivolity, among various other benign usages. In philosophy, Harry Frankfurt, among others, analyzed the concept of bullshit as related to, but distinct from, lying; the liar tells untruth, the bullshitter aims to convey a certain impression of themselves without being concerned about whether anything at all is true—it may be.

As an exclamation, "Bullshit!" conveys a measure of dissatisfaction with something or someone, but this usage need not be a comment on the truth of the matter.

== Etymology ==
"Bull", meaning nonsense, dates from the 17th century, while the term "bullshit" has been used as early as 1915 in British and American slang and came into popular usage only during World War II. The word "bull" itself may have derived from the Old French bole, meaning "fraud, deceit". The term "horseshit" is a near synonym. An occasionally used South African English equivalent, though more common in Australian slang, is "bull dust".

The New Zealand-British lexicographer Eric Partridge claimed that the term was popularized by soldiers of the Australian and New Zealand Army Corps (ANZAC) during World War I. According to Partridge, British officers of the war placed a high emphasis on "bull", which consisted of ensuring soldiers were perfectly dressed with clean clothing even when it proved to be a hindrance during military operations; ANZAC troops mocked this emphasis on presentation by calling it bullshit.

== In the philosophy of truth and rhetoric ==
=== Assertions of fact ===
"Bullshit" is commonly used to describe statements made by people concerned with the response of the audience rather than with truth and accuracy. On one prominent occasion, the word itself was part of a controversial advertisement. During the 1980 U.S. presidential campaign, the Citizens Party candidate Barry Commoner ran a radio advertisement that began with an actor exclaiming: "Bullshit! Carter, Reagan and Anderson, it's all bullshit!" NBC refused to run the advertisement because of its use of the expletive, but Commoner's campaign successfully appealed to the Federal Communications Commission to allow the advertisement to run unedited.

=== Harry Frankfurt's concept ===
In his essay On Bullshit (originally written in 1986, and published as a monograph in 2005), philosopher Harry Frankfurt of Princeton University characterizes bullshit as a form of falsehood distinct from lying. The liar, Frankfurt holds, knows and cares about the truth, but deliberately sets out to mislead instead of telling the truth. The "bullshitter", on the other hand, does not care about the truth and is only seeking "to manipulate the opinions and the attitudes of those to whom they speak":

It is impossible for someone to lie unless he thinks he knows the truth. Producing bullshit requires no such conviction. A person who lies is thereby responding to the truth, and he is to that extent respectful of it. When an honest man speaks, he says only what he believes to be true; and for the liar, it is correspondingly indispensable that he considers his statements to be false. For the bullshitter, however, all these bets are off: he is neither on the side of the true nor on the side of the false. His eye is not on the facts at all, as the eyes of the honest man and of the liar are, except insofar as they may be pertinent to his interest in getting away with what he says. He does not care whether the things he says describe reality correctly. He just picks them out, or makes them up, to suit his purpose.

Frankfurt connects this analysis of bullshit with Ludwig Wittgenstein's disdain of "non-sense" talk and with the popular concept of a "bull session", in which speakers may try out unusual views without commitment. He fixes the blame for the prevalence of "bullshit" in modern society upon the (at that time) growing influence of postmodernism and anti-realism in academia as well as situations in which people are expected to speak or have opinions without appropriate knowledge of the subject matter.

In his 2006 follow-up book, On Truth, Frankfurt clarified and updated his definition of bullshitters:

My claim was that bullshitters, although they represent themselves as being engaged simply in conveying information, are not engaged in that enterprise at all. Instead, and most essentially, they are fakers and phonies who are attempting by what they say to manipulate the opinions and the attitudes of those to whom they speak. What they care about primarily, therefore, is whether what they say is effective in accomplishing this manipulation. Correspondingly, they are more or less indifferent to whether what they say is true or whether it is false. (p. 3–4)

Several political commentators have noted that Frankfurt's concept of bullshit provides insights into political campaigns. Gerald Cohen, in "Deeper into Bullshit", contrasted the kind of "bullshit" Frankfurt describes with a type he referred to as "unclarifiable unclarity" (i.e., nonsensical discourse presented as coherent and sincere but is incapable of being meaningful). Cohen points out that this sort of bullshit can be produced either accidentally or deliberately, but is especially prevalent in academia (what he calls "academic bullshit"). According to Cohen, a sincere person might be disposed to produce a large amount of nonsense unintentionally or be deceived by and innocently repeat a piece of bullshit without intent to deceive others. However, he defined "aim-bullshitters" as those who intentionally produce "unclarifiable unclarity" (i.e., Cohen-bullshit) in situations "when they have reason to want what they say to be unintelligible, for example, in order to impress, or in order to give spurious support to a claim" (p. 133).

Cohen gives the example of Alan Sokal's "Transgressing the Boundaries" as a piece of deliberate bullshit (i.e., "aim-bullshitting"). Indeed, Sokal's aim in creating it was to show that the "postmodernist" editors who accepted his paper for publication could not distinguish nonsense from sense, and thereby by implication that their field was "bullshit".

Another application of Frankfurt's concept of bullshit is with regards to generative AI. It has been argued that the outputs from ChatGPT and similar chatbots should be regarded as bullshit, particularly when it "hallucinates", because the process by which large language models decide what text to output primarily prioritizes appearing superficially similar to meaningful, human-generated text, rather than the accuracy of any information contained therein, thereby producing confident but false information. In 2025, researchers proposed a "bullshit index" and a "bullshit taxonomy" to quantify the degree of disregard for truth in large language models.

=== David Graeber's theory of bullshit work in the modern economy ===
Anthropologist David Graeber's book Bullshit Jobs: A Theory argues the existence and societal harm of meaningless jobs. He contends that over half of societal work is pointless, which becomes psychologically destructive.

=== Education and reasoning as immunization against bullshit ===
Brandolini's law, also known as the "bullshit asymmetry principle", holds that "the amount of energy needed to refute bullshit is an order of magnitude bigger than what's needed to produce it". This truism highlights that while the battle against misinformation more generally must be fought "face to face", the larger war against belief in misinformation won't be won without prevention. Once people are set in their ways, beliefs are notoriously hard to change. Building immunity against false beliefs in the first place is the more effective long-term strategy.

University of Washington biologist Carl Bergstrom and professor Jevin West began a college course on "Calling Bullshit: Data Reasoning in a Digital World". They then launched the Calling Bullshit website and published a book with the same title.

== As an object of psychological research ==
Although attempts had been made in the past to examine bullshit and bullshitting from a scientific perspective, it did not gain attention among cognitive scientists as a legitimate area of research until 2015 when Dr. Gordon Pennycook (still a graduate student at that time) and his colleagues at University of Waterloo developed the "Bullshit Receptivity Scale" (BSR), a questionnaire designed to quantify receptivity to a particular kind of bullshit that they called "pseudo-profound bullshit" and is characteristic of Deepak Chopra. A typical example of this bullshit is: "Hidden meaning transforms unparalleled abstract beauty." The development of the BSR led to Pennycook and his colleagues winning the 2016 Ig Nobel Prize (for Peace).

Further research from Wake Forest University psychologists found evidence to support Frankfurt's notion that a person is more likely to engage in bullshitting when they feel a social pressure to provide an opinion and perceive that they will be given a social "pass" to get away with it. Indeed, some have theorized that social media offers a prime environment for bullshitting as it combines the social pressure to offer one's opinions on a wide variety of topics along with an anonymity that arguably provides a social "pass". According to researchers from Queen's University in Belfast (2008): "along with a pervasive and balkanized social media ecosystem and high internet immersion, public life provides abundant opportunities to bullshit and lie on a scale we could have scarcely credited 30 years ago".

More recently, researchers have identified a type of Dunning–Kruger effect for bullshit receptivity called the "bullshit blind spot". The researchers found that those who were the worst at detecting bullshit were not only grossly overconfident in their BS detection abilities but also believed that they were better at detecting it than the average person (i.e., they have a bullshit blind spot). Conversely, those who were the best at detecting bullshit were not only underconfident in their abilities, they also believed they were somewhat worse at detecting it than the average person. The researchers referred to this underconfidence bias among the high performers as "bullshit blindsight".

Given that much of the early scientific work on bullshit focused on those more likely to fall for it (i.e., the "bullshittees"), some researchers have turned their attention to examining those more likely to produce it (i.e., the "bullshitters"). For example, in 2021, a research team at the University of Waterloo developed the "Bullshitting Frequency Scale", which measures two types of bullshitting: "persuasive" and "evasive". They defined "persuasive bullshitting" as a rhetorical strategy intended to impress, persuade, or otherwise fit in with others by bullshitting about one's knowledge, ideas, attitudes, skills, or competence. "Evasive bullshitting" refers to an evasive rhetorical strategy in which one provides "non-relevant truths" in response to inquiries when direct answers could result in reputational harm for oneself or others.

Building on these findings, the researchers also tested the familiar adage that "you can't bullshit a bullshitter". To do so, they explored associations between scores on the Bullshitting Frequency Scale and performance on measures of receptivity to pseudo-profound bullshit, pseudoscientific bullshit, and fake news. They found that higher scores of "persuasive bullshitting" positively predicted scores for all three types of "bullshit receptivity". In other words, those who are most likely to persuasively bullshit others are in turn more likely to believe persuasive bullshit, suggesting that you can indeed bullshit a bullshitter after all.

== In everyday language ==
Outside of the academic world, among natural speakers of North American English, as an interjection or adjective, bullshit conveys general displeasure, an objection to, or points to unfairness within, some state of affairs. With this colloquial usage of "bullshit", which began in the 20th century, "bullshit" does not give a truth score to another's discourse. It simply labels something that the speaker does not like and feels he is unable to change.

In the colloquial English of the Boston, Massachusetts area, "bullshit" can be used as an adjective to communicate that one is angry or upset, for example, "I was wicked bullshit after someone parked in my spot."

== See also ==
- Buzzword bingo, also known as bullshit bingo
- Chicken shit
- Confabulation
- Fake news
- Gish gallop
- Holy cow
- Humbug
- Not even wrong
- Sacred cow
- Shibai
- Snipe hunt
- Tall tale
- Waffle (speech)
