= Pidgin to Da Max =

1981 book on Hawaiian Pidgin

Pidgin to Da Max (full title: Peppo's Pidgin to Da Max) is a humorous illustrated dictionary of Hawaiian Pidgin words and phrases, published in December 1981, by Douglas Simonson, Pat Sasaki, and Ken Sakata. With the definitions of most of the words and phrases also given in Pidgin, the book is not clearly intended to be used as a Pidgin-English dictionary, although a reader unfamiliar with the dialect would likely understand most of the entries from context and the illustrations. Rather, the book is intended to be a humorous introspective for Hawaii residents about the language many of them speak on a day-to-day basis. As such, it is a relatively popular book in Hawaii, and sold 25,000 copies in its first month in print.

By March 1982, it had sold 50,000 copies.

There is an additional volume, titled Pidgin to Da Max: Hana Hou, which follows the first book.

As an example of an entry for which the dictionary may be of little help to outsiders, consider the definition of the word da kine:

Da kine (da KINE) Da kine is the keystone of pidgin. You can use it anywhere, anytime, anyhow. Very convenient. What would we do without DA KINE? "Ey, I no can da kine if you no like da kine, too!"

The dictionary then turns around and uses "da kine" (often a notoriously difficult word for non-Pidgin speakers to understand) in some of the definitions of other words.

Haole is another word covered in the book.

The authors of Pidgin to Da Max are not originally from Hawaii, and Simonson admits to not speaking Pidgin all that well.

In 1983 there was a television show by the same name, based on the book.

== See also ==
- Bess Press
