= Karl Zinsman Jr. =

Musical Artist

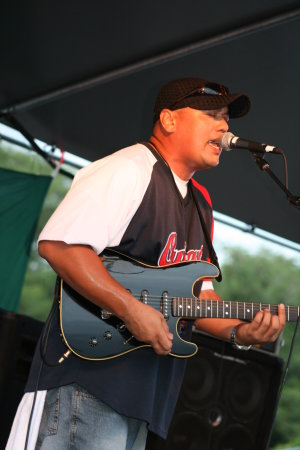

Background information
- Origin: Waianae, Hawaii, Pahoa, Hawaii, United States
- Genres: Reggae, Island Contemporary, Hawaiian, Rock, Country
- Occupations: Musician, singer-songwriter, producer, graphic designer, manager
- Instruments: Vocals, acoustic/electric guitar, bass, ukulele, piano, drums/percussion
- Years active: 1989–present
- Labels: Rubbah Slippah Productions Keaʻau, Hawaii (2021-present), Phat Bula Records Hilo, Hawaii (2008–2021), Koops2 Records Honolulu, Hawaii (2002–2007), Poi Pounder Records Kailua, Hawaii (1999–2002)
- Website: http://www.reverbnation.com/brownboyshawaii

Karl Zinsman Jr. is a Hawaiian/ Reggae multi-instrumentalist (primarily guitar), singer-songwriter, music producer, graphic designer and manager. He is an artist/ producer and founder of the Hawaiʻi-based musical groups "Three Plus", "Hi-Town" and "The Brown Boys". Currently the owner of CK Music Co. LLC based out of Hawaiʻi Island.

== Three Plus ==
2003 Na Hoku Hanohano Award "3+4U" Reggae Album of The Year Winner.

== Hi-Town ==
2010 Hawaiʻi Music Award "Hi-Town" Island Contemporary Album of The Year Winner

== The Brown Boys ==
The Brown Boys released their self-entitled debut album on June 15, 2015. The Brown Boys released their sophomore album entitled "Back To The Islands" on October 5, 2023. The album features two #1 singles "Asking For A Night" and "Big Island Moonlight". In June of 2024, "Back To The Islands" was nominated for three Nā Hōkū Hanohano Awards.

== Discography ==
1994 -Kanileʻa Collection – 'Nahenahe' -"He Mele Lahui Hawaiʻi""

1998 -Na Kama – 'Ke Ala Hou' -"Prelude", "Island Woman"

1999 -Three Plus – 'Honeybaby' – Album

2001 -Manaʻo Company – 'Spread A Little Aloha' -"Stepping Out/ Hawaiian Children" ft. Three Plus & Fiji, "Rock Me" ft. Three Plus & Damon Williams

2001 -Sean Naʻauao – 'Still Pounding' -"Two Person Party", "Driving Me Pupule", "Don't Have To Think Twice", "Cool Operator"

2001 -KCCN FM 100 All-Star Band: Young Generation – 'Various Artists' -"Me & You", ft. Three Plus

2001 -Ernie Cruz Jr. – 'Portraits' -"Where Are The Brothers" ft. Three Plus

2001 -Baywatch Hawaii – 'Soundtrack' -"Cruzin" ft. Three Plus

2002 -Island Roots Vol.1 – 'Various Artists' -"Cool Operator"

2003 -Three Plus – 'For You' – Album

2003 -Sean Naʻauao – 'Still Pounding 2' -"Mystic Man", "Who The Cap Fit"

2003 -Island Roots Vol.3 – 'Various Artists' -"Driving Me Pupule"

2004 -Kani Makou – 'Easy Stylin' -"I Wanna Be Her Man" ft. Karl Zinsman of Three Plus

2004 -Island Roots Vol.5 – 'Various Artists' -"Honeybaby"

2005 -Hawaiian Style Vol.4 – 'Various Artists' -"Don't Have To Think Twice"

2008 -Three Plus – 'The Best of Three Plus From Honeybaby to For You'

2008 -Hawaiian Style Vol.5 – 'Various Artists' -"Honeybaby"

2009 -Hi-Town – 'Hi-Town' – Album

2010 -Tribute To A Reggae Legend: Bob Marley – 'Various Artists' -"Is This Love" ft. Three Plus

2010 – Hi-Town – 'Single' -"With You"

2014 – The Brown Boys – 'Single' – "Kalapana Way"

2015 – The Brown Boys – 'The Brown Boys' – Album

2016 - The Brown Boys - 'Single' - "You're All I Need"

2020 - The Brown Boys - 'Single' - "Asking For A Night"

2021 - The Brown Boys - 'Single' - "You'll Be Mine"

2022 - The Brown Boys - 'Single' - "Big Island Moonlight"

2023 - The Brown Boys - 'Single' - "Saving All My Love"

2023 - The Brown Boys - 'Back To The Islands' - Album

2024 - The Brown Boys - 'Single' - "Back To The Islands"

2024 - The Brown Boys ft. Kaʻikena Scanlan - 'Single' - "Roots And Culture"

2025 - The Brown Boys - 'Single' - "Mellow Mood"

2025 - The Brown Boys - 'Single' - "Holding Me Tonight"

2026 - The Brown Boys - 'Single' - "Wake Up My Neighborhood"
