= Bess Press =

Hawaii-based publisher

- Founded: 1979; 47 years ago
- Founder: Benjamin Bess
- Country of origin: United States
- Headquarters location: Honolulu
- Publication types: Books
- Official website: www.besspress.com

Bess Press is an American publisher, based in Hawaii, that issues various books on Hawaiian and Pacific history and culture. It was founded in 1979 by Benjamin "Buddy" Bess and his wife Ann Rayson who came to Hawaii in 1976 from New York.

== History ==
In 1976, Benjamin Bess (a former book salesman) and his wife Ann Rayson (an English professor) moved to Honolulu so that Ann could teach at the University of Hawaii. The two founded Bess Press in 1979 after the 1978 Hawaii State Constitutional Convention required that schools teach courses in Hawaii state history. They recognized the immediate need for textbooks focused on Hawaii and produced their first textbook, titled Hawaii: Our Island State, that year. For their first several years of being open, Bess would visit schools and libraries in person to pitch their books and ask what type of books those institutions would find most useful.

In 2009 the press gifted the Hawaiʻi State Public Library System 3,000 copies of the books Hawaii Warrior Football and IZ: Voice of the People. In 2011, they acquired Editions Limited, a photography-focused publisher in Hawaii. In 2018 Bess Press opened a physical bookstore in Kaimukī, "da Shop: Books & Curiosities." da Shop primarily focuses on books from Hawaiian small presses that are difficult to find in other brick-and-mortar bookstores.

== Publications ==
Since their founding, Bess Press has expanded beyond textbooks but maintained a strong focus on Hawaii, publishing books as varied as pidgin dictionaries, memoirs, cookbooks, and young adult literature. The company focuses their publications on Hawaii residents rather than catering to tourists or visitors. By 2021, Bess Press had published over 500 unique titles.

The 1981 book Pidgin to Da Max is Bess Press' best-known title.

== Recognition ==
Several of Bess Press' titles have received awards or other recognition. In 2008, the Hawaii Book Academy named From Aloha to Zippy's: A Keiki Alphabet Book their Children's Illustrative Book of the Year.

Benjamin Bess was awarded the 2009 John Dominis Holt Award for Lifetime Achievement by the Hawaii Book Academy.
