= Da kine =

Expression in Hawaiian Pidgin

Da kine (/də ˈkaɪn/) is an expression in Hawaiian Pidgin (Hawaii Creole English), probably derived from "that kind", that usually functions grammatically as a placeholder word (compare to English "whatsit" and "whatchamacallit"). It can also take the role of a verb, adjective, or adverb. Unlike other placeholder words in English, however, which usually refer specifically to a device ("gizmo" or "widget"), person ("so-and-so"), or place ("Anytown, USA"), "da kine" is general in usage and could refer to anything, any being, object or concept. It can be used to refer to something nonspecific, or given enough context (especially when used in conversation between native speakers of the dialect) to something very specific. As such, it appears to be unique among English dialects, at least in its centrality to everyday speech.

"Da kine" is one of the most identifying characteristics of spoken Hawaiian Pidgin. The humorous illustrated dictionary Pidgin to Da Max defines "da kine" as: "the keystone of pidgin. You can use it anywhere, anytime, anyhow. Very convenient." A surfing dictionary lists da kine as "the word you use when you don't use the word."

"Da kine" is used as shorthand when it is likely the listener will understand what is meant from context or a combination of context and body language. One definition (in mixed Pidgin) is: "Can have any kine connotation depends on how you say um and who you say um wit."

"Da kine" may be related to the word "kine", which is used variously as an intensifier, short for "kind of" in the sense of "type of", and for many other purposes (perhaps almost as much variety as "da kine"). However, it may not be entirely accurate to analyze it as a phrase consisting of "da" (the Pidgin definite article) and "kine", as "kine" by itself does not have the same meaning. One possible analysis is that "da" in "da kine" is a clitic, as phrases such as "da odda kine" (other kind) or "all kine" (all kinds) are commonly used.

Examples include: I talked on my 'da kine' = I talked on 'the thing you use to talk to people' = I talked on my 'phone'; I wen fo one da kine las night = I went for a 'the thing you do when you move your legs' last night = I went for a 'run' last night

== In popular culture ==
- While "da kine" appears in many contexts and refers to almost anything, it is frequently associated with something good or genuine—"the best"-for example, as a company name.
- "Da kine" appears in the titles of books, often calling Hawaiian Pidgin itself "Da Kine Talk".
- DaKine, founded in 1979, is an outdoor apparel company specializing in sportswear and equipment for alternative sports.
- Da Kine Bail Bonds is a Honolulu, Hawaii-based bail bonds company owned by Duane "Dog" Chapman, the title character in the A&E reality TV series Dog the Bounty Hunter.
- "Da kine bud" or simply "kine bud," often misspoken as "kind bud," is used in the US to mean Hawaiian marijuana.
- "Da Kine" is cited as the callsign meaning of KINE-FM 105.1, a Honolulu-based Hawaiian music radio station.
- "Da Kine" is a song from the 1999 album Shaka the Moon by Hawaiian singer Darrel Labrado (then 14 years old). The song whimsically explains the meaning and uses of the phrase of the same name. The song gained local popularity.

== See also ==
- Pragmatics
- Skookum, similar term used in the Cascadia region of the Northwest US/western Canada
- Jawn
