= Puʻuhonua o Waiʻanae =

Homeless community in Hawaii

Puʻuhonua o Waiʻanae (Refuge of Waiʻanae) is a homeless community of around 200 near Waiʻanae Boat Harbor and is the largest homeless encampment on Oʻahu, Hawaii. The Village, as the residents call it, although run according to some of the same rules as a homeless shelter, is community-led and intends to foster a safe environment through community for children and families who would otherwise struggle against addiction, medical issues, homelessness, or a combination of the three. In response to local complaints and state announcements of plans to clear the encampment, the leadership of Puʻuhonua o Waiʻanae decided to move to a private plot of agricultural land and set up a new kauhale (homestead) village featuring permanent tiny homes, running water, electricity, farming, and communal kitchens and bathrooms. After 2 years of fundraising, Puʻuhonua o Waiʻanae was able to purchase a 20-acre plot of land in February 2020 and has started construction of the communal facilities.

== The Village ==
Twinkle Borge was living among the homeless at the Wai'anae Boat Harbor in the mid-2000s when she remarked that the existing atmosphere was not ideal for the children and families among them. She assembled a like-minded group and founded Pu'uhonua o Wai'anae with the following rules: "no sex offenders, no drugs, no stealing," and quiet hours after 8 pm. With the help of appointed "block captains," Borge’s mostly female team enforces the rules with spoken and written warnings, and then, in the worst case, eviction. During the first decade of its existence, The Village has remained mostly the same: each dwelling is either a tent or assembled from found materials and there is no electricity or running water. When a newcomer arrives, one of the block captains will take them on a tour of the village before assigning them a plot and offering essentials such as bedding and food if needed.

=== Culture ===
Pu'uhonua o Wai'anae creates a sense of community through shared responsibility and collective care. Older children look after the younger children and all residents must refrain from stealing and drugs and observe quiet hours after 8 pm. The central area of the village is the social area where adults come to relax and talk story. The residents call themselves 'houseless' rather than 'homeless', since they feel that they have found a home in the community of Pu'uhonua o Wai'anae. Plans for the future village include food programs and other benefits that The Village will offer to members of the surrounding neighborhoods as well.

=== Demographics ===
Out of the 200 or so residents, 2/3rd of the residents are Native Hawaiian and there are 18 families with children.

=== Permanent Location ===
In February 2020, Pu'uhonua o Wai'anae was able to purchase 20 acres of land for their permanent village. Contributors to the fundraiser include: Alexander & Baldwin, Henry and Colene Wong Foundation, Island Insurance Foundation, Nareit Foundation, Pyramid Insurance Centre Ltd., and Group 70 International Inc. Borge says they must finish construction before any residents can move in. Electricity and plumbing have been installed and the next priority is to build the communal bathrooms and kitchens. The new village will house 250 residents and the cost of rent and amenities will total $200–250 per month per family.

== Criticism ==
Throughout the years, the state government has threatened sweeps, or clearing, of The Village due to local complaints and environmental concerns. The neighboring communities blamed excessive water usage, garbage buildup, and vandalism on the large homeless community, as well as claiming that certain burglaries traced back to "people [...] from that area, boat harbor." Another reason The Department of Land and Natural Resources gave for a sweep was that The Village sits above the habitat of a rare local breed of shrimp, the opae ula, as well as an ancient burial ground. In response to the complaints and the DLNR, Borge says that she offered to pay for water usage and asked how the residents of Pu'uhonua o Wai'anae could better care for the shrimp populations. In March 2018, after warning of a sweep, Borge requested a private meeting with Governor David Ige, and he agreed. After speaking for 2 hours, during which Borge tried to convey that Pu'uhonua o Wai'anae was not like other homeless encampments, Governor Ige announced that there would be no sweep and we would work with Borge and the leaders of The Village to find another solution. Both the governor and Honolulu mayor Kirk Caldwell are supportive of the plan for Pu'uhonua o Wai'anae to move and transition to a permanent agri-village. Residents of the nearby Piliuka Homes have mixed reactions to their future neighbors.
