= Partners In Development Foundation =

- Formation: April 19, 1997; 29 years ago
- Type: 501(c)(3) non-profit organization
- Purpose: To inspire and equip families and communities for success and service using timeless Native Hawaiian values and traditions.
- Headquarters: Honolulu, Hawaii, U.S.
- Region served: Hawaii
- Founders: Jan E. Dill, Morris T. Takushi, Gary A. Glenn
- Website: pidf.org

Partners in Development Foundation (PIDF), an IRS Section 501(c)(3) non-profit public foundation, was incorporated in 1997 in Honolulu, Hawaii. It has established and implemented programs in the areas of education, social services, Hawaiian culture, Hawaiian language, and preservation of more than $1.6 million from the US Department of Education through the Native Hawaiian Education Act. The grants were awarded for the purpose of continuing, expanding, and improving the educational programs of PIDF.

== Programs and Services ==
=== Education ===
- Tūtū and Me - A traveling free preschool with the goal of meeting the developmental needs of children ages 0–5 years old in order to prepare them to overcome the challenges of kindergarten and of life. A caregiver is required to attend alongside the child being served as the caregiver is also instructed as to how to be a teacher and mentor to the child. It is a statewide program having locations on Hawaiʻi, Maui, Molokaʻi, Oʻahu and Kauaʻi.
- Nā Pono No Nā ʻOhana - A family education project on Hawaiian Homestead land in Waimānalo, O‘ahu. It is an effort of school and community partners that focuses on the family as the foundation for learning, and offers a program designed to prepare Native Hawaiian children for academic success in school while helping parents advance their own education, work preparedness, and parenting skills. By integrating Native Hawaiian cultural values, Nā Pono No Nā ‘Ohana has improved the social, economic, and educational opportunities for hundreds of Native Hawaiian families.
- Ka Paʻalana - The Ka Pa‘alana Traveling Preschool and Homeless Family Education Program serves houseless families on the Leeward coast of O‘ahu. Through collaborative partnerships with Leeward coast outreach agencies, Ka Pa‘alana assists families by delivering or providing access to essential services, such as a parent-child participatory preschool, food bank, toiletry, and dental supplies distribution. Ka Pa‘alana also serves as an initial contact agency for families who are ready to transition to local shelters or temporary housing facilities. Native Hawaiians and other Pacific Islanders comprise a disproportionate 59% of the sheltered population while only accounting for 17% of the state's total population. Using culturally-sensitive strategies, Ka Pa’alana incorporates early childhood and family education programs that serve between 15 and 40 children and their parents in a mobile day-center each week. Ka Pa‘alana is currently funded by the U.S. Department of Education, Office of Hawaiian Affairs, Kamehameha Schools, the Administration for Native Americans, Aloha United Way, and Friends of Hawai‘i Charities. Previous funding sources which helped develop of the program include the Hawai‘i State Department of Human Services and Nā ‘Ōiwi Kāne. There are five components to the Ka Pa‘alana program:
- Ka Hana Noʻeau - Located in the rural North Kohala district of Hawai‘i-island this project has developed mentoring programs for Hawaiian youth that meld traditional knowledge with contemporary technologies. Traditional Hawaiian products and crafts have been slowly disappearing due to fewer opportunities for adolescents to learn the skills necessary to produce them. Ka Hana No‘eau brings an older generation of craftsmen and practitioners, and puts them together with young students in a unique mentoring program that will preserve traditional knowledge, products and, skills. An important and major portion of the program is an entrepreneurial component that introduces students to the marketing possibilities that their acquired skills will produce.
- Family Education Services - A four-hour-a-day, four-day-a-week comprehensive Family Education Service is offered at transitional shelters. Parents interact with their child for the first two hours of the program, then participate in various adult education and life skills programs while their children receive an intensive, developmentally appropriate education through preschool teachers and assistants. Adult educational services include goal-setting, budgeting, vocational training, job placement, and GED preparations.
- ‘Ike No‘eau - A traveling preschool program provides developmentally appropriate, culturally relevant math and science preschool curriculum to families at the shelters and at Hawaiian Homelands in Wai‘anae and Waimānalo.
- Pili A Paʻa - Pili A Pa‘a is an educational project that was created to address critical deficits in reading, math and science for the Native Hawaiian students on the island of Hawaii. This project seeks to build teacher's knowledge of curriculum, Common Core State Standards and instructional strategies while integrating Native Hawaiian cultural values and processes.

The project provides teachers a four-week intensive training/ collaboration period to enhance their teaching practices. Teachers work with instructional coaches to create units of instruction for their respective content area(s). Coaches provide critical feedback and research based instructional strategies to enhance the curriculum development process.
Over the three-year grant period, this project expects to serve 88 teachers and 486 students at selected schools within geographic areas of Hawaii Island that have a high rate of Native Hawaiian students. The main objectives are as follows:
- To increase instructional capacity of teachers;
- To build capacity via teacher leadership; and
- To build student confidence in their ability to excel in school.

=== Social Services ===
- Hui Hoʻomalu - A foster care program, it aims to provide stable, caring homes for at-risk children with reunification with their birth family as the ultimate goal. They achieve this by recruiting, training, and assessing resource caregivers for children in foster care.

In 2006, Partners in Development Foundation was awarded a master contract from the Department of Human Services (DHS) to create and implement innovative strategies to better meet the needs of Hawai‘i's children in foster care and the resource families that care for them. Hui Ho‘omalu comprises Partners in Development Foundation, Catholic Charities Hawai‘i, and Family Programs Hawai‘i. These agencies, in partnership with DHS, address the identification, recruitment, screening, training and ongoing support and retention of Resource Families for children and families in the care of DHS.

- Ke Kama Pono - A Safe House program that services a maximum of 12 adjudicated youth, ages 13–17, for six to nine months with follow-up monitoring by the program for three years. On site classes are held by DOE certified teachers in order to assist the youth in maintaining school credits. Additionally, the residents take part in monthly team meetings with case managers, probation officers, and parent/guardians to evaluate resident treatment and service plans. The Ke Kama Pono program embeds Native Hawaiian values throughout its activities, functions, and mentorships. Residents work three times a week at the Mountain View Dairy, and twice a week they engage in activities at the Boys and Girls Clubs of America. Weekend activities vary from outdoor recreation to performing community service. Parent/guardians are required to attend monthly parenting classes which help to ensure a successful family reunification process. The Safe House program differs from many other residential programs because of the holistic approach in addressing all areas of need of the residents, including their family dynamics.
- Mālama Mobile - A “first contact” homeless outreach that provides a modified center-based preschool experience for at-risk families near coastal beach parks and homeless families living at beach parks. Families receive canned and dried goods as well as educational and social services with partners from local shelters, outreach and government agencies. Adult educational services include goal-setting, budgeting, vocational training, job placement and GED preparation. Ninety-five percent of the families served are Native Hawaiian.
- Traveling Preschool - A parent-child participatory preschool that provides services at two family shelters on the Leeward Coast. The two-hour-a-day, two-day-a-week program provides pre- and post-testing, portfolio assessment, referrals for health and developmental needs through community partners, parenting classes and TANF education. Adult educational services include goal-setting, budgeting, vocational training, job placement and GED preparation. The curriculum of the preschool meets the Hawaii Preschool Content Standards and the “Learning to Grow” Infant and Toddler Development standards.

=== Environmental ===
- Green Machine - A tank based constructed wetland wastewater treatment facility located in Makiki Valley State Recreational area in Honolulu, Hawaii. It recycles wastewater from the Hawaii Nature Center for irrigation on site in nearby fields. Constructed wetland technology uses the biology of Native Hawaiian wetland plants and bacteria to purify water.

The Living Machine™ technology was developed in the 1980s by inventor scientist, Dr. John Todd of Ocean Arks International and was used to build the Green Machine that is housed at the Hawai‘i Nature Center in Makiki. Educational programs are conducted for Hawai‘i's students where they can do experiments at the constructed wetland laboratory. The educational curriculum introduces students to the water cycle, nutrient cycle and the role of wetland ecologies in the watershed. Various lessons have been developed for different ages and meet all of the State of Hawai‘i science content standards. The Green Machine also treats a thousand gallons a day of domestic wastewater from the park facilities to bring it to Hawai‘i DOH R-2 reuse quality. The Green Machine hosts K-12 classes each month to see firsthand the natural processes of waste treatment.

== Projects and Partnerships ==
- Kawailoa - A program dedicated to replacing youth incarceration with indigenous knowledge, values, and practices that empowers communities, trains youth healers, and shifts resources to community-driven and culturally-grounded sanctuaries of support for youth and young adults.
- We Are Oceania - We are Oceania advocates for the health of Micronesian individuals and families, to empower them to utilize their indigenous skills, knowledge, being, and values with their newly acquired knowledge of their new community in Hawaii to reach their full potential and become self-sufficient.

== Hawaiian Language ==
- Baibala Hemolele - This project involves republishing the Hawaiian Bible in digital and print form to preserve the out-of-print Baibala Hemolele and to increase access of the Hawaiian Bible for the next generation of Hawaiian language students. The original translation, completed in 1839, played a significant role in the development of the Hawaiian language as a written language because the Christian missionaries needed to first create a written language to be able to print a bible in the Hawaiian language (ʻŌlelo Hawaiʻi). It continues to be a major linguistic, cultural, and spiritual resource for the Hawaiian community and Hawaiian language students throughout the world.

Digital image files of every page of the original Palapala Hemolele (published in 1839), the revised Baibala Hemolele (published in 1868), and the 1994 Baibala Hemolele have been created and are available on the Internet at Baibala.org. Searchable text files of all three Baibala and the Baibala Hemolele in the new orthography are also available on the website, as well as a recording track of the entire Baibala.

In 2012 the project, in partnership with Mutual Publishing, will publish the Hawaiian Bible in the new orthography. It will mark the first time the Hawaiian language bible has been formatted and printed with the diacritical markings: the ʻOkina and Kahakō. It will include genealogy pages and biblical maps in Hawaiian.

== Previous Programs ==
- Tech Together - A hands-on energy technology class that teaches sixth graders and their families about renewable and non-renewable energy in a classroom setting. By going into the classroom for two weeks, the Tech Together Program offers high tech projects that integrate science, technology, engineering, and math (STEM) focused on the energy industry. Some of the hands-on projects include building a solar car, solar oven, bio dome, and hydroponics system, all of which the students can keep. With qualified trainers, this program also weaves Hawaiian culture throughout, encouraging the students to think in terms of conservation, preservation and sustainability. Students are asked to solicit a mentor and share their newly acquired knowledge with their families. All participating teachers are encouraged to learn along with their students and are given tools to support their learning and enable them to continue teaching this topic in the future.
