= Shibai =

Shibai (pronounced like: "she buy," with a slight vocal inflection on the second syllable) is a popular term commonly used in the state of Hawaii. Its general meaning refers to someone who is viewed as being "pretentious" or overtly "hypocritical."

The term is used mostly regarding social interactions. It can be heard being used in reference to the political system in general, or applied to political actions, policies, even individual politicians that are deemed untrustworthy, shady or disingenuous.

The word "shibai" entered into the common local vocabulary of Hawaii by way of introduction from Japanese immigrants. The original Japanese language word, 芝居(しばい), literally translates as "a play" or "a dramatic performance," but is also used to describe a situation when someone is merely pretending or being insincere, as if performing a stage role: e.g., 芝居だよ！ - "...(s)he is only playacting!" or, "...it's all just an act!"

As a result of becoming popular in informal conversation, "shibai" can also be used even in what would be considered more "formal" venues, such as the local daily newspapers and even on local televised news broadcasts throughout Hawaii, especially during an election season.

Representative Colleen Hanabusa (D-HI) used the term as follows in response to a policy proposal by the President: "It’s absolute shibai for President Trump to propose $7 Billion in cuts to the Children’s Health Insurance Program (CHIP) and $800 million in cuts from the Center for Medicare and Medicaid Innovation, amongst other reductions, after Congress passed and the President signed the FY18 omnibus spending bill into law on March 23, 2018."

After reading the above descriptions, note that as a once much more common slang term used by a lot of second or third generation Japanese Americans in Hawaii, it is a term synonymous with BS. By saying someone or some thing is shibai means either they're "full of it" or "bullshit". "Oh, that televised debate was so shibai." or "Can you believe that guy, everything he said was shibai."

On January 27, 2019, U.S. Senator Mazie Hirono (D-H) reinforced this usage in a fundraising email, in which she wrote the following: "Trump's presidency has been such shibai--that's local slang used by many Japanese descendants in Hawaii and translates to mean hypocritical nonsense--that I can hardly stand it."
