= Hawaiian Pidgin =

English-based creole spoken in Hawaii

- Hawaii Creole English
- Native to: Hawaii, United States
- Region: Hawaiian Islands
- Ethnicity: Native Hawaiians
- Native speakers: 600,000 (2015); 400,000 L2 speakers
- Language family: English Creole: Pacific; Hawaiian Pidgin

Language codes
- ISO 639-3: hwc
- Glottolog: hawa1247
- Linguasphere: 52-ABB-dc

External audio
- Video of person speaking Hawaiian Pidgin

Hawaiian Pidgin (known formally in linguistics as Hawaiʻi Creole English or HCE and known locally as Pidgin) is an English-based creole language spoken in Hawaii. An estimated 600,000 residents of Hawaii speak Hawaiian Pidgin natively and 400,000 speak it as a second language. Although English and Hawaiian are the two official languages of the state of Hawaii, Hawaiian Pidgin is spoken by many residents of Hawaii in everyday conversation and is often used in advertising targeted toward locals in Hawaii. In the Hawaiian language, it is called ʻōlelo paʻi ʻai lit. 'hard-taro language'.

Hawaiian Pidgin was first recognized as a language by the U.S. Census Bureau in 2015. However, Hawaiian Pidgin is still thought of as lower status than the Hawaiian and English languages.

Despite its name, Hawaiian Pidgin is not a pidgin, but rather a full-fledged, nativized and demographically stable creole language. It did, however, evolve from various real pidgins spoken as common languages between ethnic groups in Hawaii.

Although not completely mutually intelligible with Standard American English, Hawaiian Pidgin retains a high degree of mutual intelligibility with it compared to some other English-based creoles, such as Jamaican Patois, in part due to its relatively recent emergence. Some speakers of Hawaiian Pidgin tend to code switch between or mix the language with Standard American English. This has led to a distinction between pure "heavy Pidgin" and mixed "light Pidgin".

== History ==
Hawaiian Pidgin originated on sugarcane plantations in 1835 as a form of communication between Native Hawaiians, who spoke Hawaiian, and foreign immigrants, who spoke English and other languages. It supplanted, and was influenced by, the existing pidgin that Native Hawaiians already used on plantations and elsewhere in Hawaii. Since such sugarcane plantations often hired workers from many different countries, a common language was needed in order for the plantation workers to communicate effectively with each other and their supervisors. Hawaiian Pidgin has been influenced by many different languages, including Portuguese, Hawaiian, American English, and Cantonese. As people of other backgrounds were brought in to work on the plantations, Hawaiian Pidgin acquired even more words from languages such as Japanese, Ilocano, Okinawan and Korean.

The article Japanese loanwords in Hawaii lists some of those words originally from Japanese. Hawaiian Pidgin has also been influenced to a lesser degree by Spanish spoken by Puerto Rican settlers in Hawaii. As there were eventually more immigrant families who brought their children to the plantations, these children learned the language from their parents as well as English at school. Over time, a new pidgin language developed from all of the different language backgrounds which became many of the children's first language. This was the origin of Hawaiian Pidgin, which was used and is still used by many Hawaiian and non-Hawaiian people who live there.

Hawaiian Pidgin was created mainly to provide communication and facilitate cooperation between the foreign laborers and the English-speaking Americans in order to do business on the plantations. Even today, Hawaiian Pidgin retains some influences from these languages. For example, the word stay in Hawaiian Pidgin has a form and use similar to the Hawaiian verb noho, Portuguese verb ficar or Spanish estar, which mean 'to be' but are used only when referring to a temporary state or location.

In the 19th and 20th centuries, Hawaiian Pidgin started to be used outside the plantation between ethnic groups. In the 1980s, two educational programs were established which were taught in Hawaiian Pidgin to help students learn Standard English. Public school children learned Hawaiian Pidgin from their classmates and parents. Living in a community mixed with various cultures led to the daily usage of Hawaiian Pidgin, which caused the language to expand. It was easier for school children of different ethnic backgrounds to speak Hawaiian Pidgin than to learn another language. Children who grew up learning and speaking this language expanded Hawaiian Pidgin as it was their first language, or mother tongue. For this reason, linguists generally consider Hawaiian Pidgin to be a creole language.

Hawaiian Pidgin is said to have since been decreolized (Romaine, 1994), especially in Oʻahu, Hawaii, which holds the largest population of the islands. This is due to capitalism and economic changes on the islands that were implemented by the United States. Furthermore, tourism and technology have made the English language more utilized in Hawaiʻi, which has led to the endangerment of Hawaiian Pidgin. Hawaiian Pidgin was also not taught in public education nor does it have its own writing system. Consequently, Hawaiian Pidgin was thought of as a "low social status" language and is only a memory of the plantations that many want to forget. This brought upon racial discrimination to those who spoke the language, which excluded children from school who spoke Hawaiian Pidgin. Even though people were against Hawaiian Pidgin, the language has since been strengthened and supported by young people who honor Hawaiian Pidgin and its origins. Hawaiian Pidgin is an integral part of Hawaiian identity and efforts to encourage and solidify pride in the language are becoming more common.

== Demographics and status ==
A five-year survey that the U.S. Census Bureau conducted in Hawaii revealed that many people spoke Hawaiian Pidgin as an additional language. As a result of this, the U.S. Census Bureau in 2015 added Hawaiian Pidgin to the list of official languages in the state of Hawaii.

In the last few decades, many residents of Hawaii have moved to the US mainland due to economic issues. As a result, thousands of Pidgin speakers can be found in the other 49 states.

Historically, teachers and policymakers have debated whether growing up speaking Hawaiʻi Creole English hinders the learning of Standard English.

== Phonology ==
Hawaiian Pidgin has distinct pronunciation differences from standard American English (SAE). Long vowels are not pronounced in Hawaiian Pidgin if the speaker is using Hawaiian loanwords. Some key differences include the following:

- Th-stopping: /θ/ and /ð/ are pronounced as [t] or [d] respectively—that is, changed from a fricative to a plosive (stop). For instance, think /θiŋk/ becomes [tiŋk], and that /ðæt/ becomes [dæt]. An example is "Broke da mout" (tasted good).
- L-vocalization: Word-final l [l~ɫ] is often pronounced [o] or [ol]. For instance, mental /mɛntəl/ is often pronounced [mɛntoː]; people is pronounced [pipo].
- Hawaiian Pidgin is non-rhotic. That is, r after a vowel is often omitted, similar to many dialects, such as Eastern New England, Australian English, and British English variants. For instance, car is often pronounced cah, and letter is pronounced letta. Intrusive r is also used. The number of Hawaiian Pidgin speakers with rhotic English has also been increasing.
- Hawaiian Pidgin has falling intonation in questions. In yes/no questions, falling intonation is striking and appears to be a lasting imprint of Hawaiian (this pattern is not found in yes/no question intonation in American English). This particular falling intonation pattern is shared with some other Oceanic languages, including Fijian and Samoan (Murphy, K. 2013).
- In certain words, the sound /ts/ assimilates to /s/. Examples include: what's [wʌts] becoming wass [wʌs] and it's [ɪts] becoming iss [ɪs]. This feature is also found in African-American Vernacular English.

Vowels
Front	Central	Back	
i ɪ		u ʊ	High
e ɛ	ʌ ɝ	o ɔ	Mid
æ a		ɑ	Low

Others include: /ü/, /ʉu̠/, /aɔ̠/ /aɪ/ /öɪ̠/ /ɑu/ /ɔi/ and /ju/.

Consonants
	Labial	Alveolar	Postalveolar	Palatal	Velar	Glottal
Plosive	p b	t d			k g	ʔ
Nasal	m	n				
Fricative	f v	s z	tʃ dʒ			
Approximant		ɹ l		j	w	

== Grammatical features ==
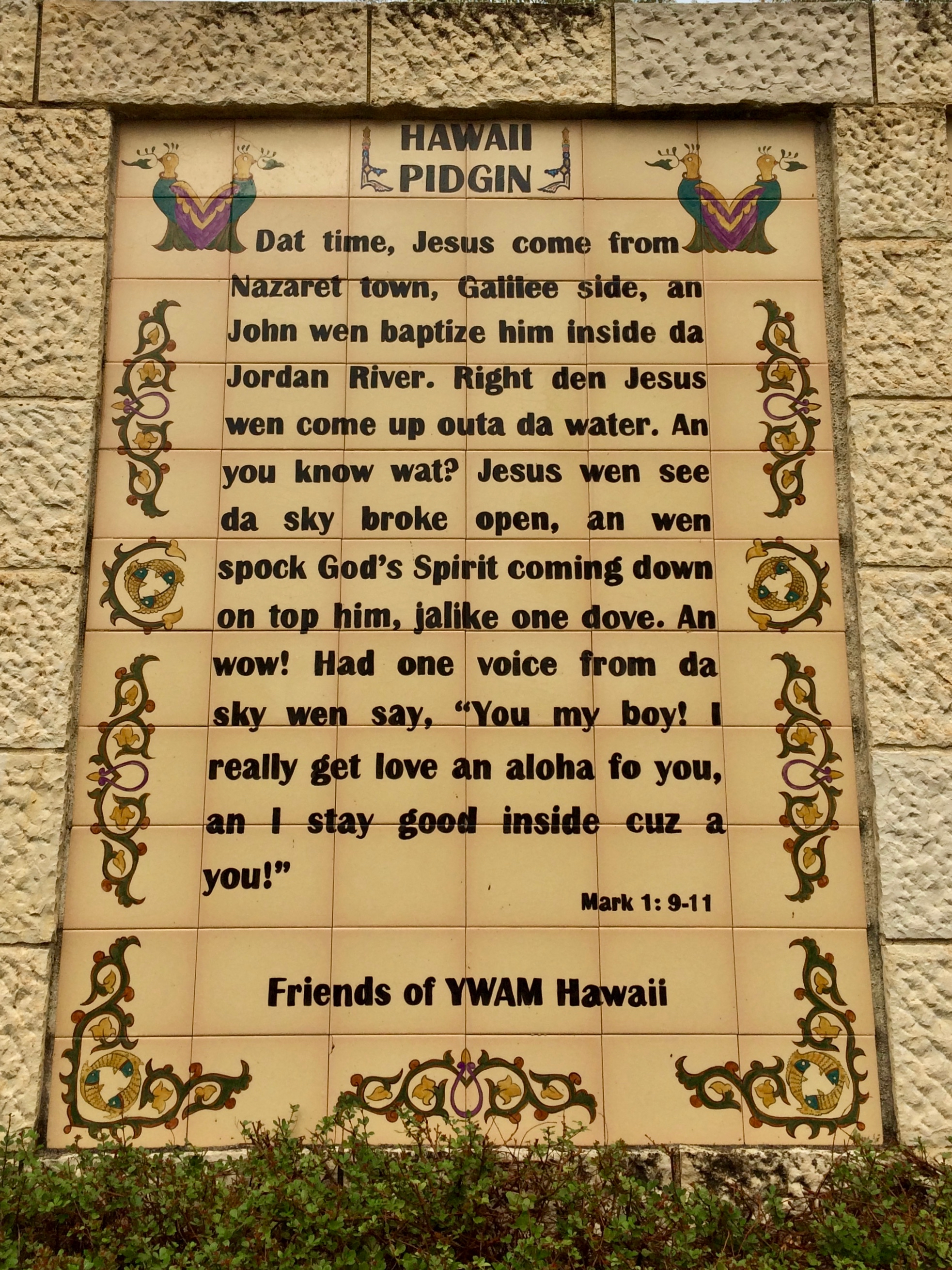
Inscription in Hawaiian Pidgin (Gospel of Mark 1:9-11)

Hawaiian Pidgin has distinct grammatical forms not found in SAE, although some of them are shared with other dialectal forms of English or may derive from other linguistic influences.

Forms used for SAE "to be":

- Generally, forms of English "to be" (i.e. the copula) are omitted when referring to inherent qualities of an object or person, forming in essence a stative verb form. Additionally, inverted sentence order may be used for emphasis. (Many East Asian languages use stative verbs instead of the copula-adjective construction of English and other Western languages.)

Da behbeh cute. (or) Cute, da behbeh.
The baby is cute.

These constructions also mimic the grammar of the Hawaiian language. In Hawaiian, "nani ka pēpē" is literally "beautiful the baby" retaining that specific syntactic form, and is perfectly correct Hawaiian grammar with equivalent meaning in English, "The baby is beautiful."

- When the verb "to be" refers to a temporary state or location, the word stay is used (see above). This may be influenced by other Pacific creoles, which use the word stap, from stop, to denote a temporary state or location. In fact, stop was used in Hawaiian Pidgin earlier in its history, and may have been dropped in favor of stay due to influence from Portuguese estar or ficar (ficar is literally translated to English as 'to stay', but often used in place of "to be" e.g. "ele fica feliz" he is happy).

Da book stay on top da table.
The book is on the table.

Da watah stay cold.
The water is cold.

For tense-marking of verb, auxiliary verbs are employed:

- To express past tense, Hawaiian Pidgin uses wen (went) before the infinitive form of the modified verb.

Jesus wen cry. ("Da Jesus Book", John 11:35)
Jesus cried.

- To express future tense, Hawaiian Pidgin uses goin (going), derived from the going-to future common in informal varieties of American English.

God goin do plenny good kine stuff fo him. ("Da Jesus Book", Mark 11:9)
God is going to do a lot of good things for him.

- To express past tense negative, Hawaiian Pidgin uses neva (never). Neva can also mean "never" as in Standard English usage; context sometimes, but not always, makes the meaning clear.

He neva like dat.
He didn't want that. (or) He never wanted that. (or) He didn't like that.

- Use of fo (for) in place of the infinitive particle "to". Cf. dialectal form "Going for carry me home."

I tryin fo tink. (or) I try fo tink.
I'm trying to think.

== Regional varieties ==
The grammar and vocabulary of Hawaiian Pidgin is largely uniform though there are slight changes depending on the region it's spoken in.

For instance, while standard Pidgin uses “wen” as a past tense verb marker, Kauai speakers are more likely to use “had”.

She had go awready. (Kauai)
She wen go awready. (Standard)
She went already.

Another example is shave ice being “ice shave” on the Big Island.

Hawaiian Pidgin has different varieties that vary depending on the island. Hawaiian Pidgin is considered more decreolized than other pidgins/creoles in the Pacific region (for example, compared to Tok Pisin). The continuum of the language across the islands has been created due to decreolization and some islands having more metropolitan growth than the others.

== Sociolinguistics ==
The language is highly stigmatized in formal settings, for which American English or the Hawaiian language are preferred. Many researchers believe the continued delegitimization of this creole is rooted in the language's origin story and colonial past, as it was once a plantation language. Therefore, its usage is typically reserved for everyday casual conversations. Studies have proven that children in kindergarten preferred Hawaiian Pidgin, but once they were in grade one and more socially conditioned they preferred Standard English. Hawaiian Pidgin is often criticized in business, educational, family, social, and community situations as it might be construed as rude, crude, or broken English among some Standard English speakers. However, many tourists find Hawaiian Pidgin appealing – and local travel companies favor those who speak Hawaiian Pidgin and hire them as speakers or customer service agents.

Most linguists categorize Hawaiian Pidgin as a creole, as a creole refers to the linguistic form "spoken by the native-born children of pidgin-speaking parents". However, many locals view Hawaiian Pidgin as a dialect. Other linguists argue that this "standard" form of the language is also a dialect. Based on this definition, a language is primarily the "standard" form of the language, but also an umbrella term used to encapsulate the "inferior" dialects of that language.

The Pidgin Coup, a group of Hawaiian Pidgin advocates, claims that Hawaiian Pidgin should be classified as a language. The group believes that the only reason it is not considered a language is due to the hegemony of English. "Due to the hegemony of English, a lack of equal status between these two languages can only mean a scenario in which the non-dominant language is relatively marginalized. Marginalization occurs when people hold the commonplace view that HCE and English differ in being appropriate for different purposes and different situations. It is this concept of 'appropriateness' which is a form of prescriptivism; a newer, more subtle form." These Hawaiian Pidgin advocates believe that by claiming there are only certain, less public contexts in which Hawaiian Pidgin is only appropriate, rather than explicitly stating that Hawaiian Pidgin is lesser than Standard English, masks the issue of refusing to recognize Hawaiian Pidgin as a legitimate language. In contrast, other researchers have found that many believe that, since Hawaiian Pidgin does not have a standardized writing form, it cannot be classified as a language. Many linguists argue for the need to destigmatize Pidgin. One way to do so, linguists argue, includes the use of Pidgin in the classroom.

== Literature and performing arts ==
In recent years, writers from Hawaii such as Lois-Ann Yamanaka, Joe Balaz, and Lee Tonouchi have written poems, short stories, and other works in Hawaiian Pidgin. A Hawaiian Pidgin translation of The Bible (called Da Good an Spesho Book) has also been created, in 2020, by Wycliffe Bible Translators, Inc. Also an adaptation of William Shakespeare's Twelfth Night, or What You Will, titled in Hawaiian Pidgin "twelf nite o' WATEVA!"

Several theater companies in Hawaiʻi produce plays written and performed in Hawaiian Pidgin. The most notable of these companies is Kumu Kahua Theater.

The 1987 film North Shore contains several characters, particularly the surfing gang Da Hui, that speak Hawaiian Pidgin. This leads to humorous misunderstandings between the haole protagonist Rick Kane and several Hawaiian locals, including Rick's best friend Turtle, who speaks Hawaiian Pidgin.

Hawaiian Pidgin has occasionally been featured on Hawaii Five-0 as the protagonists frequently interact with locals. A recurring character, Kamekona Tupuola (portrayed by Taylor Wiley), speaks Hawaiian Pidgin. The show frequently displays Hawaiian culture and is filmed at Hawaiʻi locations.

Another film that features Hawaiian Pidgin is Netflix's Finding ‘Ohana, a film that depicts the story of a brother and sister duo from Brooklyn who embark on a journey to reconnect with their Hawaiian heritage, this includes learning about Hawaiian Pidgin, as it was integral to their family history.

Milton Murayama's novel All I asking for is my body uses Hawaiian Pidgin in the title of the novel. R. Zamora Linmark employs it extensively in his semi-autobiographical novel Rolling the R's; two of the major characters speak predominately in Pidgin and some chapters are narrated in it. The novel also includes examples of Taglish.

Two books, Pidgin to Da Max and Pidgin to Da Max: Hana Hou, humorously portray Hawaiian Pidgin through prose and illustrations.

As of March 2008, Hawaiian Pidgin has started to become more popular in local television advertisements as well as other media. When Hawaiian Pidgin is used in advertisements, it is often changed to better fit the targeted audience of the kamaʻāina.

== Sample text ==
Genesis 1:1–4
Hawaiian Pidgin	English
1. Da time wen eryting wen start, God make da sky an da world.; 2. Da world come so no mo notting inside, no mo shape notting. On top da wild ocean dat cova eryting, neva had light notting. Ony had God Spirit dea, moving aroun ova da watta. 3. Den God tell, “I like light fo shine!” an da light start fo shine. 4. God see how good da light. Den he put da light on one side, an da dark on da odda side.	1.In the beginning God created the heavens and the earth. 2.Now the earth was formless and empty, darkness was over the surface of the deep, and the Spirit of God was hovering over the waters. 3.And God said, “Let there be light,” and there was light. 4. God saw that the light was good, and he separated the light from the darkness.

== See also ==
- Da kine
- Maritime Polynesian Pidgin, a Hawaiian-, Tahitian- and Maori-based pidgin that predated pidgin English in the Pacific.
