= Waiʻanae, Hawaii =

Census-designated place in Honolulu County, Hawaii

Waiʻanae
- Census-designated place
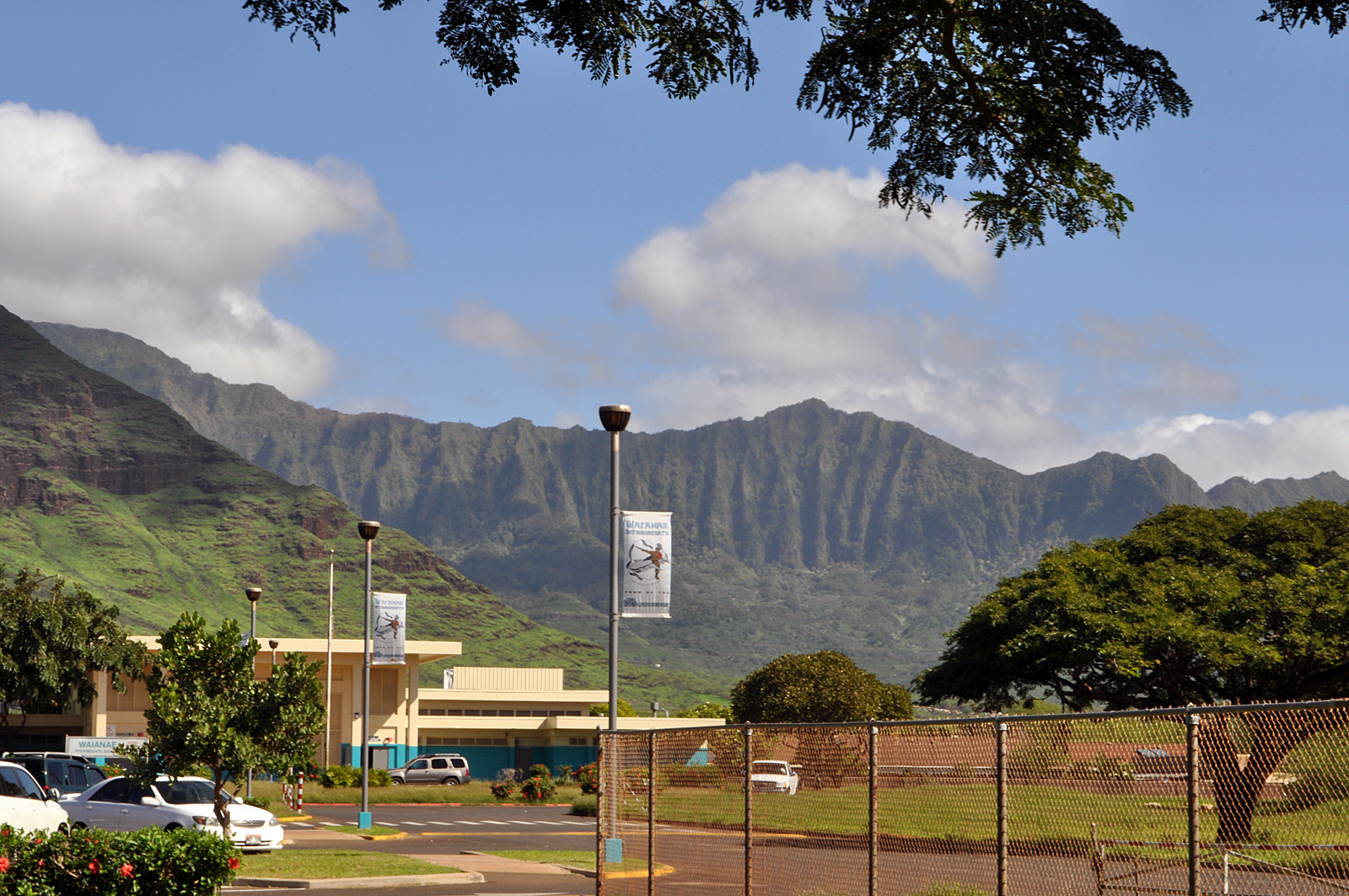
- Waianae

- Location in Honolulu County and the state of Hawaii
- Coordinates: 21°26′52″N 158°10′45″W
- County: Honolulu
- State: Hawaii
- Country: United States

Area
  - Total: 7.08 sq mi (18.34 km^{2})
  - Land: 5.40 sq mi (13.98 km^{2})
  - Water: 1.68 sq mi (4.36 km^{2})
- Elevation: 12 ft (3.7 m)

Population (2020)
  - Total: 13,614
  - Density: 2,522.3/sq mi (973.87/km^{2})
- Time zone: UTC-10 (Hawaii-Aleutian)
- ZIP code: 96792
- Area code: 808
- FIPS code: 15-74450
- GNIS feature ID: 0364549

Waiʻanae (Hawaiian pronunciation: [vɐjʔəˈnɐe̯]) is a census-designated place (CDP) in the City and County of Honolulu, Hawaii, United States. As of the 2020 census, the CDP population was 13,614.

Its name means "waters of the mullet". Its etymology is shared with the far northern Wellington suburb of Waikanae, located in New Zealand.

== Geography ==
Waiʻanae is located at 21°26′52″N 158°10′45″W (21.447714, -158.179213).

According to the United States Census Bureau, the CDP has a total area of 7.0 square miles (18.2 km^{2}), of which 5.4 square miles (13.9 km^{2}) is land and 1.7 square miles (4.4 km^{2}), or 23.92%, is water.

== Demographics ==
Historical population
Census	Pop.	Note	%±
1970	3,302		—
1980	7,941		140.5%
1990	8,758		10.3%
2000	10,506		20.0%
2010	13,177		25.4%
2020	13,614		3.3%
U.S. Decennial Census

As of the census In 2000, there were 2,595 households and 2,221 families residing in the CDP. The population density was 3,086.0 inhabitants per square mile (1,191.5/km^{2}). There were 2,925 housing units at an average density of 859.2 per square mile (331.7/km^{2}). The racial makeup of the CDP was 9.35% White, 0.81% African American, 0.26% Native American, 19.44% Asian, 27.26% Pacific Islander, 0.97% from other races, and 41.92% from two or more races. Hispanic or Latino residents of any race were 14.00% of the population.

There were 2,595 households, out of which 43.9% had children under the age of 18 living with them, 58.0% were married couples living together, 19.6% had a female householder with no husband present, and 14.4% were non-families. 10.9% of all households were made up of individuals, and 4.1% had someone living alone who was 65 years of age or older. The average household size was 4.04 and the average family size was 4.30.

In the CDP, 34.8% of the population was under the age of 18, 10.4% was from 18 to 24, 26.8% from 25 to 44, 19.8% from 45 to 64, and 8.2% was 65 years of age or older. The median age was 29 years. For every 100 females there were 98.9 males. For every 100 females age 18 and over, there were 94.5 males.

The median income for a household in the CDP was $46,717, and the median income for a family was $48,145. Males had a median income of $32,328 versus $22,451 for females. The per capita income for the CDP was $13,348. About 17.2% of families and 19.8% of the population were below the poverty line, including 28.6% of those under age 18 and 7.9% of those age 65 or over.

Racial Composition of Waiʻanae
Race NH = Non-Hispanic	% 2020	% 2010	% 2000	Pop. 2020	Pop. 2010	Pop. 2000
White Alone (NH)	6.4%	6.9%	8%	867	912	844
Black Alone (NH)	0.9%	0.7%	0.7%	123	97	69
Native American Alone (NH)	0.1%	0.1%	0.2%	14	16	21
Asian Alone (NH)	12.2%	13.5%	18.1%	1666	1783	1905
Pacific Islander Alone (NH)	30.7%	28.2%	25.4%	4183	3719	2672
Other Race Alone (NH)	0.2%	0%	0.1%	30	5	11
Multiracial (NH)	33.4%	34.5%	33.4%	4552	4546	3513
Hispanic (Any race)	16%	15.9%	14%	2179	2099	1471

== Climate ==
Waiʻanae has a tropical savanna climate (Köppen: Aw).

Climate data for Waiʻanae
Month	Jan	Feb	Mar	Apr	May	Jun	Jul	Aug	Sep	Oct	Nov	Dec	Year
Mean daily maximum °F (°C)	73.9 (23.3)	73.6 (23.1)	73.8 (23.2)	75.0 (23.9)	76.8 (24.9)	78.6 (25.9)	79.5 (26.4)	80.1 (26.7)	80.2 (26.8)	79.0 (26.1)	77.2 (25.1)	75.2 (24.0)	76.9 (25.0)
Daily mean °F (°C)	72.3 (22.4)	71.6 (22.0)	71.8 (22.1)	73.0 (22.8)	74.5 (23.6)	76.1 (24.5)	77.0 (25.0)	77.5 (25.3)	77.7 (25.4)	77.0 (25.0)	75.4 (24.1)	73.6 (23.1)	74.8 (23.8)
Mean daily minimum °F (°C)	70.9 (21.6)	70.2 (21.2)	70.2 (21.2)	71.4 (21.9)	72.9 (22.7)	74.3 (23.5)	75.2 (24.0)	75.7 (24.3)	75.9 (24.4)	75.4 (24.1)	73.9 (23.3)	72.3 (22.4)	73.2 (22.9)
Average precipitation inches (mm)	1.32 (34)	1.32 (34)	1.73 (44)	0.69 (18)	0.59 (15)	0.43 (11)	0.31 (7.9)	0.44 (11)	0.37 (9.4)	0.87 (22)	1.19 (30)	1.93 (49)	11.19 (285.3)
Source: Weather.Directory

== Education ==
The Hawaii Department of Education operates the public schools.

District schools inside the CDP include Leihoku Elementary School, Waiʻanae Elementary School, and Waiʻanae Intermediate School.

Waianae High School, which has a Waianae postal address, is physically located in two CDPs: mostly in Makaha, and partially in Waianae.

The district's Kamaile Academy is outside of the CDP. A PreK-12 charter school, Ka Waihona O Ka Naʻauao - New Century Pcs, is in the CDP.

Additionally Maili Elementary School has a Waianae address but is in the Maili CDP.

Leeward Community College operates Wai‘anae Moku in Maili CDP; it has a Waianae postal address.

== Homeless camp ==
Hawaii's largest homeless camp, called Puʻuhonua o Waiʻanae, is located here. It covers an area of about 20 acres adjacent to the boat harbor. Hawaii Governor David Ige met with Twinkle Borge, the leader of Puʻuhonua o Waiʻanae, in March 2018, committing not to sweep the camp and displace its residents, but its future remains uncertain.

== Notable people ==
- Israel Kamakawiwoʻole, Hawaiian musician and singer
- Max Holloway, former UFC Featherweight Champion and former UFC BMF Champion
- DeForest Buckner, NFL player for the Indianapolis Colts
- Karl Zinsman Jr., singer-songwriter
