= Gordon Pennycook =

Canadian psychologist

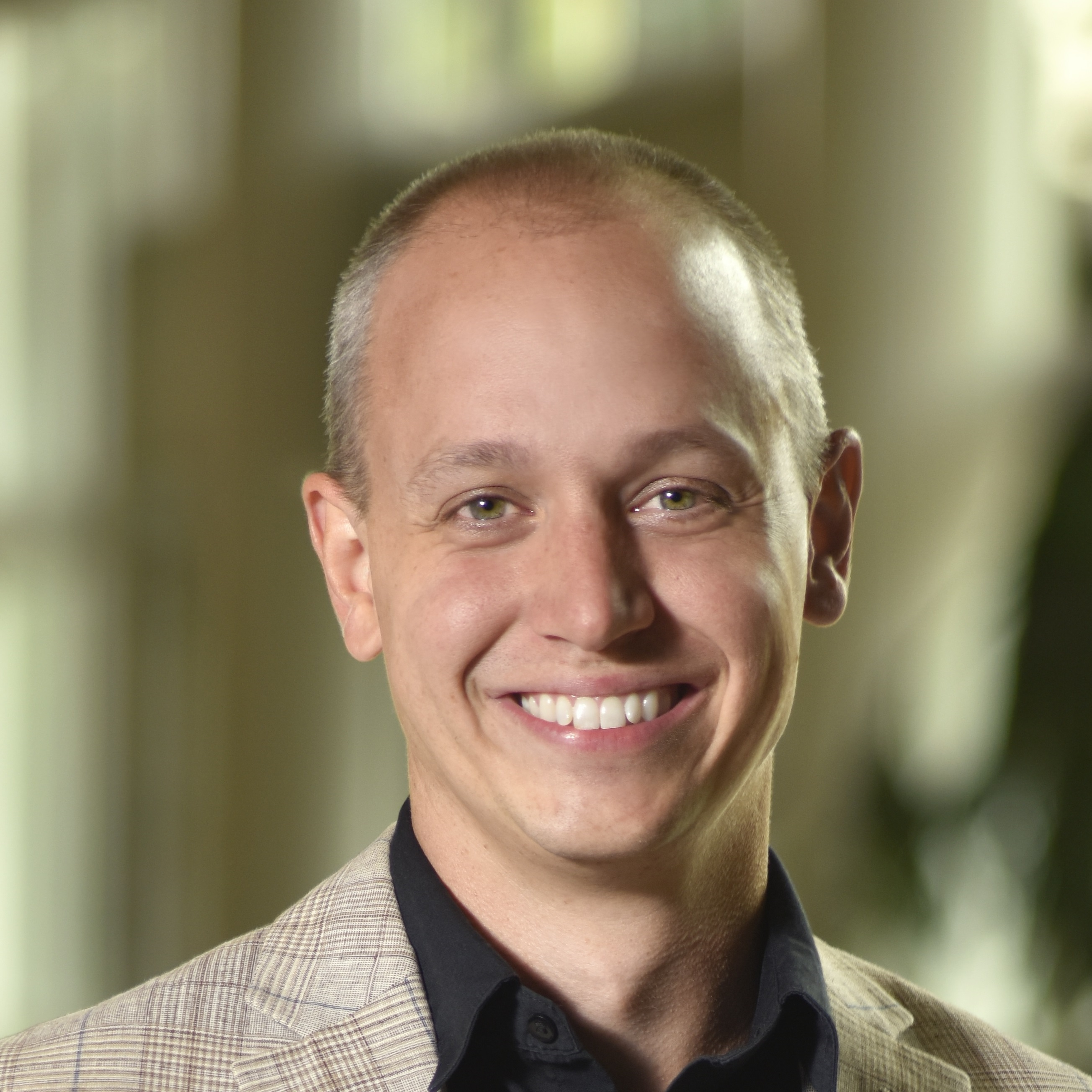
- Born: Carrot River, Saskatchewan, Canada

Academic background
- Education: BA, 2009, University of Saskatchewan; MA, 2011, PhD, 2016, University of Waterloo
- Thesis: What makes us think?: a three-stage dual-process model of analytic engagement (2016)

Gordon Robert Pennycook is a Canadian psychologist who is an associate professor at Cornell University. He is also an adjunct professor of Behavioural Science at the University of Regina's Hill and Levene Schools of Business. In 2020, he was elected to be a member of the Royal Society of Canada’s College of New Scholars, Artists, and Scientists.

== Early life and education ==
Pennycook grew up in Carrot River, Saskatchewan, Canada. He earned his Bachelor of Arts degree at the University of Saskatchewan before enrolling at the University of Waterloo for his Master's degree and PhD. At the University of Waterloo, Pennycook co-authored On the Reception and Detection of Pseudo-Profound Bullshit which won the 2016 Ig Nobel Peace Prize. Upon graduating, he received the Governor General's Gold Medal for outstanding scholastic achievements of a student in Canada and accepted a Social Sciences and Humanities Research Council Banting Postdoctoral Fellowship at Yale University. As a Postdoctoral Fellowship, Pennycook became interested in fake news and conducted studies on people sharing misinformation on social media.

== Career ==
Following his Postdoctoral Fellowship, Pennycook became an assistant professor of Behavioural Science at the University of Regina's Hill and Levene Schools of Business. In 2018, he received a research grant from the Miami Foundation to examine why people fall for fake and hyperpartisan news. He also edited a book, The New Reflectionism in Cognitive Psychology: Why Reason Matters and authored five book chapters. As a result of his academic achievements, Pennycook received the Canadian Society for Brain, Behaviour and Cognitive Science (CSBBCS) Vincent Di Lollo Early Career Award. Later that year, Pennycook was named a member of the Royal Society of Canada’s College of New Scholars, Artists, and Scientists.
