= Radical empiricism =

Philosophical doctrine

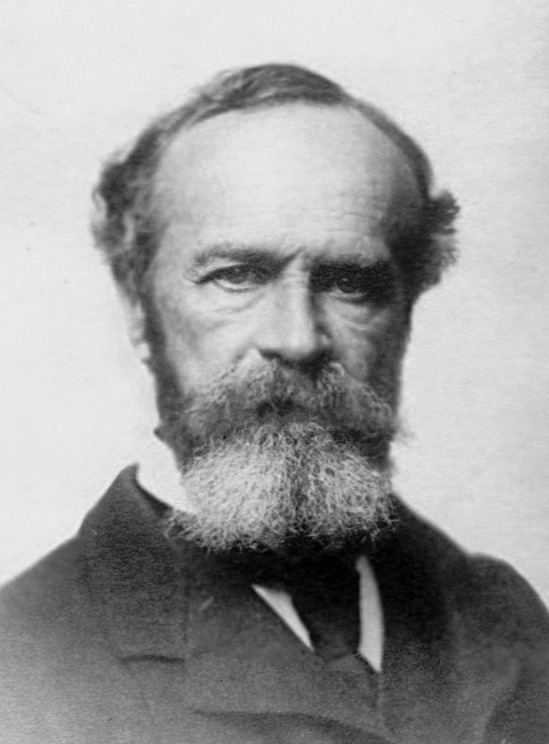
William James

Radical empiricism is a philosophical doctrine put forward by William James. It asserts that experience includes both particulars and relations between those particulars, and that therefore both deserve a place in our explanations. In concrete terms: Any philosophical worldview is flawed if it stops at the physical level and fails to explain how meaning, values and intentionality can arise from that.

== Radical empiricism ==
Radical empiricism is a postulate, a statement of fact, and a conclusion, says James in The Meaning of Truth (1909). The postulate is that "the only things that shall be debatable among philosophers shall be things definable in terms drawn from experience." The fact is that our experience contains disconnected entities as well as various types of connections; it is full of meaning and values. The conclusion is that our worldview does not need "extraneous trans-empirical connective support, but possesses in its own right a concatenated or continuous structure."

=== Postulate ===
The postulate is a basic statement of the empiricist method: Our theories shouldn't incorporate supernatural or transempirical entities. Empiricism is a theory of knowledge that emphasizes the role of experience, especially sensory perception, in the formation of ideas, while discounting a priori reasoning, intuition, or revelation. James allows that transempirical entities may exist, but that it's not fruitful to talk about them.

=== Fact ===
James' factual statement is that our experience is not just a stream of data, but a complex process that's full of meaning. We see objects in terms of what they mean to us and we see causal connections between phenomena. Experience is "double-barreled"; it has both a content ("sense data") and a reference, and empiricists unjustly try to reduce experience to bare sensations, according to James. Such a "thick" description of conscious experience was already part of William James' monumental work The Principles of Psychology in 1890, more than a decade before he first wrote about radical empiricism.

It differs notably from the traditional empiricist view of Locke and Hume, who see experience in terms of atoms like patches of color and soundwaves, which are in themselves meaningless and need to be interpreted by ratiocination before we can act upon them.

=== Conclusion ===
James concludes that experience is full of connections and that these connections are part of what is actually experienced:

Just so, I maintain, does a given undivided portion of experience, taken in one context of associates, play the part of a knower, of a state of mind, of 'consciousness'; while in a different context the same undivided bit of experience plays the part of a thing known, of an objective 'content.' In a word, in one group it figures as a thought, in another group as a thing. And, since it can figure in both groups simultaneously we have every right to speak of it as subjective and objective, both at once. (James 1912, Essay I)

== Context and importance ==
James put forward the doctrine because he thought ordinary empiricism, inspired by the advances in physical science, has or had the tendency to emphasize 'whirling particles' at the expense of the bigger picture: connections, causality, meaning. Both elements, James claims, are equally present in experience and both need to be accounted for.

The observation that our adherence to science seems to put us in a quandary is not exclusive to James. For example, Bertrand Russell notes the paradox in his Analysis of Matter (1927): we appeal to ordinary perception to arrive at our physical theories, yet those same theories seem to undermine that everyday perception, which is rich in meaning.

Radical empiricism relates to discussions about direct versus indirect realism as well as to early twentieth-century discussions against the idealism of influential philosophers like Josiah Royce. This is how neo-realists like William Pepperell Montague and Ralph Barton Perry interpreted James.

The conclusion that our worldview does not need transempirical support is also important in discussions about the adequacy of naturalistic descriptions of meaning and intentionality, which James attempts to provide, in contrast to phenomenological approaches or some forms of reductionism that claim that meaning is an illusion.

== See also ==
- John Dewey, who in his Experience and Nature, attacks the same dichotomies that bothered James: objectivity/subjectivity, mind/body and so on. His position is more or less the same as that of James, although he does not himself use the term 'radical empiricism' but rather 'immediate empiricism.
- Brian Massumi
- New realism
