= William Montague =

William Montague may refer to:

- William Pepperell Montague (1873–1953), philosopher
- William Montague (cleric) (1757–1833), Anglican minister from Boston and Dedham, Massachusetts

== See also ==
- William Montagu (disambiguation)
