= Episteme (disambiguation) =

Episteme is a philosophical term referring to knowledge, science or understanding. It may also refer to:

- Galaktion and Episteme
- Episteme (moth), a genus of moths of the family Noctuidae
- Episteme: A Journal of Individual and Social Epistemology, an academic journal
