= Philosophy of testimony =

Epistemology of learning from others

The philosophy of testimony (also, epistemology of testimony) considers the nature of language and knowledge's confluence, which occurs when beliefs are transferred between speakers and hearers through testimony.

== Definitions ==
Testimony constitutes words, gestures, or utterances that convey beliefs. This definition may be distinguished from the legal notion of testimony in that the speaker does not have to make a declaration of the truth of the facts. The role of testimony in acquiring belief and knowledge has been a relatively neglected philosophical issue. C. A. J. Coady believes that this is because traditional epistemology has had a distinctly individualist flavor. It seems that many of the beliefs that we hold have been gained through accepting testimony. For example, one may only know that Kent is a county of England or that David Beckham earns $30 million per year because one has learned these things from other people. A more striking example is the belief about one's own birthdate. If you know your birthdate, the evidence for your belief was almost certainly received through testimony.

One of the problems with acquiring knowledge through testimony is that it does not seem to live up to the standards of knowledge (see justification of knowledge in philosophy ). As Owens notes, it does not seem to live up to the Enlightenment ideal of rationality captured in the motto of the Royal Society – ‘Nullius in verba (Into the word of no one)’. The Royal Society interprets this as "take nobody's word for it." Crudely put, the question is: 'How can testimony give us knowledge when we have no reasons of our own?'

== Approaches ==
Coady suggests that there are two approaches to this problem:

- Reductivism, which seeks to ‘reduce’ or re-describe our behaviour such that it is not at odds with the traditional view of knowledge

and

- Anti-reductivism, which seeks to fit our behaviour in with a different concept of knowledge. For example, we may compare it to an account of how perception gives us knowledge or how memory gives us knowledge directly.

Hume is one of the few early philosophers to offer anything like a sustained account of testimony, this can be found in his ‘An Enquiry Concerning Human Understanding’ in the section on miracles. The basic idea is that our justification for believing what people tell us comes from our experience of the ‘...constant and regular conjunction’ between the state of affairs as people describe it and the actual state of affairs (i.e. our observation that they match). On Coady's schema he is a reductivist.

Coady offers an anti-reductivist account of testimony. He claims that testimony is like perception, we don't have to have reasons for believing it, only an absence of reasons not to believe it. On Coady's account we are justified in being credulous. Proponents of anti-reductivism in the history of philosophy include Augustine of Hippo and Thomas Reid. Bertrand Russell also argued that knowledge by acquaintance played an important part in epistemology.

== Reliability ==
Although skeptics of testimony as a way of acquiring knowledge may posit that potential speakers or testifiers may themselves be unreliable, it has been argued that testimony forms a distinct source of knowledge; instead of testimony being able to be reduced to other ways of acquiring information, testimony itself is a "fundamental" way of knowing. This view has been expressed by the Indian philosopher Aksapada Gautama in the 2nd century BC. Furthermore, proponents of this belief claim that trust in testimony plays a significant factor in communication. A prominent modern theorist in the philosophy of testimony (Jennifer Lackey) has used an analogy via comparing the reliability (or depth) of knowledge transfer that occurs in testifying as akin to the amount of water that is present in transferring knowledge; in this case, "testifying" would be transferring water from one bucket to another, and recipients typically expect a "full bucket".

== See also ==
- Social epistemology
- Pragmatics
