= Maurizio Ferraris =

Italian philosopher (born 1956)

Maurizio Ferraris (born 7 February 1956, Turin) is an Italian continental philosopher and scholar, whose name is associated especially with the philosophical current named "new realism"—Ferraris wrote the Manifesto of New Realism in 2012, which was published in 2014)—which shares significant similarities with speculative realism and object oriented ontology.

A pupil of Gianni Vattimo and influenced by Jacques Derrida, Ferraris began as a theorist of hermeneutics before turning his attention to analytic philosophy. Over the years, he has been able to create an effective synthesis between the two approaches, creating a new ontological realism that rejects Kant's schematism in the domain of cognition.

Since 1995, Ferraris has been Professor of Philosophy in the Department of Literature and Philosophy at the University of Turin, where he also runs the LabOnt (Laboratory for Ontology). He studied in Turin, Paris and Heidelberg. He is the editor of the Rivista di Estetica and is a member of the editorial board of Critique and aut aut. From 1989 to 2010, Ferraris contributed regularly to the cultural supplement of the Italian newspaper Il Sole 24 ORE. Since 2010, he has been writing for the cultural section of La Repubblica. His main areas of expertise are hermeneutics, aesthetics and ontology.

== Biography ==
Ferraris graduated with a laurea in philosophy at the University of Turin in 1979, under the guidance of Gianni Vattimo. In the early years of his career, he divided his time between teaching, research and cultural journalism. From 1979 to 1988, he was an editor and then co-director of Alfabeta, whose directive committee included, among others, Antonio Porta, Nanni Balestrini, Maria Corti, Umberto Eco, Francesco Leonetti, Pier Aldo Rovatti and Paolo Volponi. In the early eighties, he began his relationship with Derrida, who deeply marked his philosophical training. On the academic level, in 1984, after two years of teaching in Macerata (1982–83), he began to teach in Trieste, interspersing his didactic activities with a series of stays in Heidelberg. Here, after getting in contact with Gadamer, he started his studies in hermeneutics.

In 1995, Ferraris was called to Turin as a full Professor of Aesthetics, and later began teaching Metaphysics (Filosofia teoretica) in 1999. While working as a director of program (i.e. teacher) at the Collège international de philosophie from 1998 to 2004, in 1999, he founded the Laboratory for Ontology (LabOnt) and the Inter-University Centre for Theoretical and Applied Ontology (CTAO). Currently, Ferraris is a Full Professor of Philosophy at the University of Turin, where he is also the President of the LabOnt (Laboratory for Ontology) and of the Centre for Theoretical and Applied Ontology (CTAO). He is a Fellow of Käte Hamburger Kolleg “Recht als Kultur” (Bonn) and an Honorary Fellow of the Centre for Advanced Studies of South East Europe (Rijeka). Ferraris has been a Fellow of the Italian Academy for Advanced Studies in America and of the Alexander von Humboldt Stiftung. He has also been Directeur d’études of the Collège International de Philosophie and a Visiting Professor at the École des Hautes Études en Sciences Sociales (Paris), as well as other European and American Universities.

Ferraris is a columnist for La Repubblica, the Director of Rivista di Estetica, and the co-director of Critique and the Revue francophone d’esthétique. He wrote more than fifty books that have been translated into several languages. The books that have appeared in English are: History of Hermeneutics (Humanities Press, 1996), Documentality or Why it is Necessary to Leave Traces (Fordham UP, 2012), Goodbye Kant! (SUNY UP, 2013), Where Are You? An Ontology of the Cell Phone (Fordham UP, 2015) and Manifesto of New Realism (SUNY UP, 2015). Maurizio Ferraris has worked in the field of aesthetics, hermeneutics and social ontology, attaching his name to the theory of documentality, and contemporary new realism.

== Thought ==
Ferraris’ early interests lay in French post-structuralist philosophy, with special attention to authors such as Jean-François Lyotard, Michel Foucault, Jacques Lacan and Gilles Deleuze. A special role in the formation of his thought was undoubtedly played by Jacques Derrida, with whom Ferraris has maintained a relationship of research, later turned into a friendship, since 1981. Evidence of this phase of his thought can be found in his early works: Differenze (1981), Tracce (1983) and La svolta testuale (1984). Ferraris has specifically dedicated to Derrida: Postille a Derrida (1990), Honoris causa a Derrida (1998), Introduzione a Derrida (2003), Il gusto del segreto (1997) [A Taste for the Secret, Blackwell 2001] and, finally, Jackie Derrida. Ritratto a memoria (2006). While working with Gadamer, starting in the early eighties, Ferraris then turned to hermeneutics, writing: Aspetti dell’ermeneutica del Novecento (1986), Ermeneutica di Proust (1987), Nietzsche e la filosofia del Novecento (1989) and especially Storia dell’ermeneutica (1988) [History of Hermeneutics, Humanities Press, 1996].

== The turning point ==
At the end of the eighties, Ferraris developed an articulated critique of Heidegger and Gadamer's tradition (see, in particular, Cronistoria di una svolta, the 1990 afterword to Heidegger's conference “The Turn”), which makes use of post-structuralism to challenge the romantic and idealistic legacy affecting such tradition. The conclusion of this critical path led the philosopher to the reconsideration of the relationship between the spirit and the letter, as well as to a reversal of their traditional opposition. Oftentimes, both philosophers and ordinary people despise the letter (the rules and constraints instituted through documents and inscriptions of various kinds) and set the spirit (i.e. thought and will) above it, recognizing the creative freedom of the latter as opposed to the former. For Ferraris, it is the letter that precedes and founds the spirit. Thus occurred the transition to the second phase of the thought of the Italian philosopher.

Ferraris abandoned hermeneutic relativism and Derridean deconstruction to embrace a form of realistic objectivism according to which "objectivity and reality, considered by radical hermeneutics as principles of violence and abuse, are in fact – and precisely because of the contraposition between spirit and letter mentioned above – the only protection against arbitrariness". This principle, which applies to morals, is based on the acknowledgement of a sphere of reality that is independent of interpretations (see, in particular, L’ermeneutica, 1998). The external world, recognized as unamendable, and the relationship between conceptual schemes and sensory experience (aesthetics, restored to its etymological meaning of "science of sensory perception", acquires a primary significance – see, in particular, Analogon rationis (1994 ), Estetica (1996, with other authors), L’immaginazione (1996), Experimentelle Ästhetik (2001) and Estetica razionale (1997)) are the dominant themes of the second phase of Ferraris’ thought, which involves a re-reading of Kant through the naive physics of the perceptologist Paolo Bozzi (see Il mondo esterno (2001) and Goodbye Kant!(2004, forthcoming for SUNY Press)). Ferraris' "critical ontology" recognizes the world of everyday life as largely impenetrable compared to conceptual schemes. The failure to acknowledge this principle traces back to the confusion between ontology (the sphere of being) and epistemology (the sphere of knowledge); such confusion is critically thematised by Ferraris starting from the character of unamendability that is typical of being as opposed to knowledge (see in particular: Ontologia (2003) and Storia dell’ontologia (2008, with other authors)). His reflection on realism led, in 2011, to the elaboration of the Manifesto of New Realism.

== From social ontology to documentality ==
The natural outcome of critical ontology is the twofold acknowledgement of the external world as unamendable and of the domain of objects which Kantian transcendental philosophy rightly applies to: that of social objects. This new phase of Ferraris’ thought was ideally inaugurated with the publication of Dove sei? Ontologia del telefonino (2005) [Where are you? Ontology of the Cell Phone, forthcoming for Fordham UP] and went on with Babbo Natale, Gesù adulto (2006), Sans Papier (2007), La fidanzata automatica (2007) and Il tunnel delle multe (2008). The basic thesis is that the distinction between ontology and epistemology, combined with the acknowledgment of the ontological autonomy of the sphere of social objects (regulated by the constitutive law "object = inscribed act"), allows for the correction of Derrida's thesis that "there is nothing outside the text "(literally, and asemantically,"there is no outside text") so as to theorize, against Searle, that “there is nothing social outside the text." This leads to the mature stage of Ferraris’ thought, fully exposed and systematized in what may be considered his summa: Documentalità. Perché è necessario lasciar tracce (2009) [Documentality. Why It Is Necessary to Leave Traces, Fordham UP, 2010] - and a monographic issue of the ‚“Monist“ (Edited by Maurizio Ferraris and Leonardo Caffo).

== Documentality ==
The most influential ontology of social reality, formulated by the American philosopher John Searle (1995), is based on collective intentionality, which allegedly ensures that certain physical objects (e.g., a piece of paper) are transformed into social objects (e.g., a banknote). As noted by Barry Smith (2003), this perspective has difficulty in accounting for both negative entities – such as debts, which apparently do not have a physical counterpart – and the new, seemingly intangible, social objects generated by the Web. The theory of documentality proposed by Maurizio Ferraris (2005) aims to solve these problems by arguing that social objects are always recordings of social acts. This accounts for both negative entities and the virtual entities of the web, which consist precisely of recordings, just like any other social object. For the theory of documentality, the constitutive rule of social reality is "Object = Inscribed Act", where “inscribed” is equal to “recorded”. That is: a social object is the result of a social act (such as involving at least two people), which is characterized by its being recorded on some support, including the minds of the people involved in the act (in the case of informal social acts such as promises).

Articulated by Ferraris (2009) in a complete ontological theory and by Smith (2012) in a theory of document acts, documentality has three main reasons of interest. First, it has been able to account for the substantial growth of documents and recording devices in the Web world, which is very well explained by the proposed constitutive law of social reality. Secondly, it has been able to explain why social reality, while requiring the presence of subjects for the enactment of acts, may develop independently from them and even without their knowledge (an economic recession can take place even if no human subject is aware of it). Third, instead of making social reality depend on the action of collective intentionality – with an increasing social constructivism (Searle 2010) – documentality is capable of substantiating a "new realism" (Ferraris, 2012) that helps continental philosophy come out of the impasses of postmodernism and reconnect with analytic philosophy. [Source of this description of documentality: L. Caffo, "From Documentality to New Realism", in The Monist, 97:2 April 2014].

== New realism ==
The realist turn carried out by Maurizio Ferraris starting from the formulation of aesthetics not as philosophy of art, but as ontology of perception and sensory experience (Estetica razionale 1997 new edition 2011), finds a further declination in the Manifesto del nuovo realismo (2012) [Manifesto of new realism, SUNY Press, 2014]. New Realism – the principles of which were anticipated by Ferraris in an article published in La Repubblica on 8 August 2011 and which then started a massive debate – is primarily a consideration of some historical, cultural and political phenomena (i.e. the analysis of postmodernism up to its deteriorating into media populism). From these reflections follows the urge to shed light on the outcomes produced by the derivations of postmodernism within contemporary thought (i.e. the interpretation of philosophical realisms and "theories of truth" that developed starting from the end of the last century in response to a deviation of the relationship between the individual and reality). This, in turn, leads to the proposal of an antidote to the degeneration of postmodernist ideology and the degraded and mendacious relationship with the world that it has caused: New Realism, in fact, identifies itself with the synergistic action of three key words, Ontology, Critique and Enlightenment. New Realism has been the subject of several debates and national and international conferences and has called for a series of publications that involve the concept of reality as a paradigm, even in non-philosophical areas. In fact, the debate on new realism, for a number of contributions and media response, has no equivalent in recent cultural history, to the point of being chosen as 'case study' for the analysis of the sociology of communication and linguistics.

New realism was discussed in the Frankfurter Allgemeine Zeitung, in the Neue Zürcher Zeitung and the Süddeutsche Zeitung. A monographic issue of the ‚“Monist“ (Edited by Maurizio Ferraris and Mario De Caro) would also shortly appear. Furthermore, the topic was re-elaborated both in Warum es die Welt nicht gibt by Markus Gabriel (Berlin, Ullstein Verlag 2013) and in Manifiesto del nuevo realismo analógico (Buenos Aires, Circulo Herméneutico 2013) by Mauricio Beuchot (México-UNAM) and José Luis Jerez (Argentina-UNCo).

History In the frame of hermeneutics, as a reaction against its constructivist or nihilistic outcomes, Maurizio Ferraris has proposed the so-called "New Realism" (Manifesto del nuovo realismo, 2012), a philosophical orientation shared by both analytic philosophers – such as Mario De Caro (see Bentornata Realtà, ed by De Caro and Ferraris, 2012), and continental philosophers, such as Mauricio Beuchot (Manifesto del realismo analogico, 2013), and Markus Gabriel (Fields of Sense: A New Realist Ontology, 2014). New Realism also garnered the support of great thinkers such as Umberto Eco, Hilary Putnam and John Searle, intersecting with other realistic movements that arose independently but responding to similar needs, such as the "speculative realism" defended by the French philosopher Quentin Meillassoux and the American philosopher Graham Harman. For New Realism, the fact that it is becoming increasingly clear that science is not systematically the ultimate measure of truth and reality does not mean that we should say goodbye to reality, truth or objectivity, as was posited by much twentieth-century philosophy. Rather, it means that philosophy, as well as jurisprudence, linguistics or history, has something important and true to say about the world.

In this context, New Realism presents itself primarily as a negative realism: the resistance that the outside world opposes to our conceptual schemes should not be seen as a failure, but as a resource – a proof of the existence of an independent world. If this is the case, however, this negative realism turns into a positive realism: in resisting our reality does not merely set a limit we cannot trespass, but it also offers opportunities and resources. This explains how, in the natural world, different life-forms can interact in the same environment without sharing any conceptual scheme and how, in the social world, human intentions and behaviours are made possible by a reality that is first given, and that only at a later time may be interpreted and, if necessary, transformed. Now that the season of postmodernism has died out, New Realism expresses the widespread need for renewal in extra-disciplinary areas such as architecture, literature, pedagogy and medicine.

== Documentality, Doc-Humanity, Webfare ==
In recent years, Ferraris has turned his attention to the transformations due to what he calls the “documedia revolution”, i.e., the social, anthropological, and technological transformation that has revealed the centrality of documents, especially thanks to the spread of the web. In the digital age, indeed, unlike in the analogue one, information is first transcribed and then transmitted and, also for this reason, leaves many traces. Their great diffusion is also due to the change in the relationship between those who produce and those who use the media content: whereas in classical media (such as radio or television) we have a one-to-many relationship, on the web the relationship is many-to-many.

These reflections led Ferraris to further elaborate his theory of documentality, which resulted in Doc-Humanity (2022). Here, Ferraris elaborates on the idea of the web as the greatest recording apparatus there is and dwells on the implications this recognition has and should have, such as the transformation of human beings and their work. The former goes from being characterised as homo sapiens to being defined as homo valens, i.e., who produces value. The production of this value, through so-called big data, should be recognised as a form of work and lead to a redistribution of profits, thanks to a welfare system that, because it is web-based, Ferraris calls Webfare. This would allow us to improve our socio-economic conditions and pay attention to key areas of human development, such as education.

== Prizes ==
- 2021 “Erca d’argento” Prize, Nizza Monferrato
- 2018 “Altiero Spinelli” Prize for Outreach UE Commission
- 2018 "Elio Matassi" philosophical award
- 2017 "Humboldt Forschung" award, LMU Munich
- 2012 "Capalbio" philosophical award
- 2008 "Viaggio a Siracusa" philosophical award
- 2007 "Ringrose Prize", Berkeley University
- 2006 "Castiglioncello" philosophical award
- 2005 "Valitutti" philosophical award
- 1990 "Claretta" philosophical award

== Works ==
Translated into English

- (2022) Doc-Humanity (Mohr Siebeck)
- (2020) Learning to Live: Six Essays on Marcel Proust (Brill)
- (2015) Where are you? An Ontology of the Cell Phone with a foreword of Umberto Eco (Fordham UP)
- (2015) Positive Realism (Zero Books)
- (2015) Introduction to New Realism (Bloomsbury)
- (2014) Manifesto of New Realism (Suny UP)
- (2013) Goodbye, Kant! (Suny UP)
- (2013) Documentality (Fordham UP)
- (1988) History of hermeneutics (Humanities Press)
- (1997) A Taste for the Secret, with Jacques Derrida, Giacomo Donis and David Webb (Blackwell)

Translated into French

- (2014) Âme et iPad

Latest works in Italian

- (2022) Agostino. Fare la verità, Bologna: il Mulino, pp. 200
- (2021) Post-coronial Studies, Turin: Einaudi, pp. 136
- (2021) Documanità. Filosofia del mondo nuovo, Rome-Bari: Laterza, pp. 440
- (2018) Intorno agli unicorni. Supercazzole, ornitorinchi, ircocervi, Bologna: il Mulino, pp. 144
- (2018) Il denaro e i suoi inganni, with John R. Searle, Torino: Einaudi, pp. 136
- (2017) Postverità e altri enigmi, Bologna: il Mulino, pg. 181
- (2017) Filosofia teoretica with E. Terrone, Bologna: il Mulino, pg. 333
- (2016) L'imbecillità è una cosa seria, Bologna: il Mulino, pg. 129
- (2016) Emergenza, Turin: Einaudi, pg. 118
- (2016) I modi dell’amicizia, with A. Varzi, Napoli-Salerno: Orthotes Editrice, pp. 60
- (2015) Mobilitazione Totale, Rome: Laterza, pg. 113
- (2014) Spettri di Nietzsche, Parma: Guanda, 2014, pp. 256
- (2013) Realismo Positivo, Turin: Rosenberg e Sellier, pg. 120
- (2013) Realismo positivo Torino: Rosenberg & Sellier, pp. 112
- (2013) Filosofia Globalizzata, Milan: Mimesis, pg. 136
- (2012) Lasciar tracce: documentalità e architettura', Milan: Mimesis, pg. 96
- (2012) Bentornata Realtà. Il nuovo realismo in discussione (eds.), with Mario De Caro, Turin: Einaudi, pg. 230
