= Christian Onof =

British philosopher

Education
- Education: Imperial College London (PhD), Birkbeck College (MA), University College London (PhD)
- Theses: The ethics of dutiful faith : individuated quest and Kantian imperative (2004); Stochastic modelling of British rainfall using Poisson processes (1992)
- Doctoral advisors: Sebastian Gardner (2004), Howard Wheater (1992)

Philosophical work
- Era: 21st-century philosophy
- Region: Western philosophy
- Institutions: Imperial College London
- Main interests: Kantian philosophy, existentialism

Christian Onof is a British philosopher and engineering mathematician. He is Reader in Stochastic Environmental Systems at Imperial College London and Honorary Research Fellow in the Department of Philosophy at Birkbeck College London. He is known for his works on Kantian philosophy.

With Leslie Marsh, Onof was a founding editor of the journal Episteme. He is an assessing editor at the Journal of Mind and Behavior, as well as an area editor in 18th and 19th century German philosophy for the Internet Encyclopedia of Philosophy.

== Books ==
- The Problem of Free Will and Naturalism: Paradoxes and Kantian Solutions, Bloomsbury, 2024, ISBN 9781350425361

== See also ==
- Stigmergy
- Friedrich Hölderlin
