= New realism (philosophy) =

Movement in philosophy

New realism was a philosophy expounded in the early 20th century (especially the 1910s) by a group of six US based scholars, namely Edwin Bissell Holt (Harvard University), Walter Taylor Marvin (Rutgers College), William Pepperell Montague (Columbia University), Ralph Barton Perry (Harvard), Walter Boughton Pitkin (Columbia) and Edward Gleason Spaulding (Princeton University).

== Overview ==
The central feature of the new realism was a rejection of the epistemological dualism of John Locke and of older forms of realism, especially indirect realism. The group maintained that, when one is conscious of, or knows, an object, it is an error to say that the object in itself and our knowledge of the object are two distinct facts. If we know a particular cow is black, is the blackness on that cow or in the observer's mind? Holt wrote (1912): "That color out there is the thing in consciousness selected for such inclusion by the nervous system's specific response." Consciousness is not physically identical with the nervous system: it is "out there" with the cow, all throughout the field of sight (and smell, and hearing) and identical with the set of facts it knows at any moment. The nervous system is merely a system of selection.

This early twentieth-century position is often grouped with neutral monism or radical empiricism, has had a mixed afterlife: it declined as a dominant program in analytic philosophy, partly because of the problem of the nature of abstract ideas such as blackness. It seems very natural to locate blackness as an abstract idea in the mind that is useful in dealing with the world. The new realists did not want to acknowledge representationalism at all but later embraced something akin to Aristotle's form of realism: blackness is a general quality that many objects have in common, and the nervous system selects not just the object but the commonality as a fact. But Arthur Lovejoy showed in his book The Revolt Against Dualism that the perception of black varies so much, depending on context in the visual field, the perceiver's personal history and cultural usage, that it cannot be reduced to commonalities within objects. Better, Lovejoy thought, to bring representational ideas back into the account after all.

== New realism in contemporary philosophy ==
In the framework of continental hermeneutics, as a reaction against its constructivist or nihilistic outcomes, Maurizio Ferraris has proposed the so-called new realism (Manifesto del nuovo realismo, 2012), a philosophical orientation shared by both analytic philosophers such as Mario De Caro (Bentornata Realtà, 2012), and continental philosophers, such as Mauricio Beuchot (Manifesto del realismo analogico, 2013), and Markus Gabriel (Fields of Sense: A New Realist Ontology, 2014). Subsequently, in South America, Rossano Pecoraro (Cenários da Filosofia contemporânea: fim da pós-modernidade e new realism?, São Paulo, 2015; Cosa resta della Filosofia Contemporanea?, Salerno-Roma, 2013) proposed a political philosophy based on Italian new realism.

New realism intersects with other realistic continental movements that arose independently but responded to similar needs, such as the "speculative realism" defended by the French philosopher Quentin Meillassoux and the American philosopher Graham Harman.

For new realism, the assumption that science is not systematically the ultimate measure of truth and reality does not mean that we should abandon the notions of reality, truth, or objectivity, as was posited by much of twentieth-century philosophy. Rather, it means that philosophy, as well as jurisprudence, linguistics, or history, has something important and true to say about the world. In this context, new realism presents itself primarily as a negative realism: the resistance that the outside world poses to our conceptual schemes should not be seen as a failure but as a resource – a proof of the existence of an independent world. If this is the case, however, this negative realism turns into a positive realism: in resisting us reality does not merely set a limit we cannot trespass, but it also offers opportunities and resources. This explains how, in the natural world, different life-forms can interact in the same environment without sharing any conceptual scheme and how, in the social world, human intentions and behaviors are made possible by a reality that is first given, and that only at a later time may be interpreted and, if necessary, transformed.

== See also ==
- Critical realism (philosophy of perception)
- Direct and indirect realism
- Egocentric predicament
- Naïve realism
- Philosophy of perception

People

- Samuel Alexander (a parallel new realist in Britain)
- Roy Wood Sellars (a philosopher whose thought was developed against American new realism)
