= Social epistemology =

Knowledge as a collective achievement

Social epistemology refers to a broad set of approaches that can be taken in epistemology (the study of knowledge) that construes human knowledge as a collective achievement. Another way of characterizing social epistemology is as the evaluation of the social dimensions of knowledge or information.

As a field of inquiry in analytic philosophy, social epistemology deals with questions about knowledge in social contexts, meaning those in which knowledge attributions cannot be explained by examining individuals in isolation from one another. The most common topics discussed in contemporary social epistemology are testimony (e.g. "When does a belief that x is true which resulted from being told 'x is true' constitute knowledge?"), peer disagreement (e.g. "When and how should I revise my beliefs in light of other people holding beliefs that contradict mine?"), and group epistemology (e.g. "What does it mean to attribute knowledge to groups rather than individuals, and when are such knowledge attributions appropriate?"). Social epistemology also examines the social justification of belief.

One of the enduring difficulties with defining "social epistemology" that arises is the attempt to determine what the word "knowledge" means in this context. There is also a challenge in arriving at a definition of "social" which satisfies academics from different disciplines. Social epistemologists may exist working in many of the disciplines of the humanities and social sciences, most commonly in philosophy and sociology. In addition to marking a distinct movement in traditional and analytic epistemology, social epistemology is associated with the interdisciplinary field of science and technology studies (STS).

== History of the term ==
The consideration of social dimensions of knowledge in relation to philosophy started in 380 B.C.E with Plato’s dialogue: Charmides. This dialogue included Socrates' argument about whether anyone is capable of examining if another man's claim that he knows something, is true or not. In it he questions the degree of certainty an unprofessional in a field can have towards a person’s claim to be a specialist in that same field. Charmides also explored the tendency of the utopian vision of social relations to degenerate into dystopian fantasy. As the exploration of a dependence on authoritative figures constitutes a part of the study of social epistemology, it confirms the existence of the ideology in minds long before it was given its label.

In 1936, Karl Mannheim turned Karl Marx‘s theory of ideology (which interpreted the “social” aspect in epistemology to be of a political or sociological nature) into an analysis of how the human society develops and functions in this respect. Particularly, this Marxist analysis prompted Mannheim to write Ideology and Utopia, which investigated the classical sociology of knowledge and the construct of ideology.

The term “social epistemology” was first coined by the library scientists Margaret Egan. and Jesse Shera in a Library Quarterly paper at the University of Chicago Graduate Library School in the 1950s. The term was used by Robert K. Merton in a 1972 article in the American Journal of Sociology and then by Steven Shapin in 1979. However, it was not until the 1980s that the current sense of “social epistemology” began to emerge.

=== The rise of social epistemology ===
In the 1980s, there was a powerful growth of interest amongst philosophers in topics such as epistemic value of testimony, the nature and function of expertise, proper distribution of cognitive labor and resources among individuals in the communities and the status of group reasoning and knowledge.

In 1987, the philosophical journal Synthese published a special issue on social epistemology which included two authors that have since taken the branch of epistemology in two divergent directions: Alvin Goldman and Steve Fuller. Fuller founded a journal called Social Epistemology: A journal of knowledge, culture, and policy in 1987 and published his first book, Social Epistemology, in 1988. Goldman’s Knowledge in a Social World came out in 1999. Goldman advocates for a type of epistemology which is sometimes called “veritistic epistemology” because of its large emphasis on truth. This type of epistemology is sometimes seen to side with “essentialism” as opposed to “multiculturalism”. But Goldman has argued that this association between veritistic epistemology and essentialism is not necessary. He describes Social Epistemology as knowledge derived from one’s interactions with another person, group or society.

Goldman looks into one of the two strategies of the socialization of epistemology. This strategy includes the evaluation of social factors that impact knowledge formed on true belief. In contrast, Fuller takes preference for the second strategy that defines knowledge influenced by social factors as collectively accepted belief. The difference between the two can be simplified with exemplars e.g.: the first strategy means analyzing how your degree of wealth (a social factor) influences what information you determine to be valid whilst the second strategy occurs when an evaluation is done on wealth’s influence upon your knowledge acquired from the beliefs of the society in which you find yourself.

Fuller's position supports the conceptualization that social epistemology is a critique of context, particularly in his approach to "knowledge society" and the "university" as integral contexts of modern learning. It is said that this articulated a reformulation of the Duhem-Quine thesis, which covers the underdetermination of theory by data. It explains that the problem of context will assume this form: "knowledge is determined by its context". In 2012, on the occasion of the 25th anniversary of Social Epistemology, Fuller reflected upon the history and the prospects of the field, including the need for social epistemology to re-connect with the larger issues of knowledge production first identified by Charles Sanders Peirce as ‘’cognitive economy’’ and nowadays often pursued by library and information science. As for the “analytic social epistemology”, to which Goldman has been a significant contributor, Fuller concludes that it has “failed to make significant progress owing, in part, to a minimal understanding of actual knowledge practices, a minimised role for philosophers in ongoing inquiry, and a focus on maintaining the status quo of epistemology as a field.”

=== Kuhn, Foucault, and the sociology of scientific knowledge ===
The basic view of knowledge that motivated the emergence of social epistemology as it is perceived today can be traced to the work of Thomas Kuhn and Michel Foucault, which gained acknowledgment at the end of the 1960s. Both brought historical concerns directly to bear on problems long associated with the philosophy of science. Perhaps the most notable issue here was the nature of truth, which both Kuhn and Foucault described as a relative and contingent notion. On this background, ongoing work in the sociology of scientific knowledge (SSK) and the history and philosophy of science (HPS) was able to assert its epistemological consequences, leading most notably to the establishment of the strong programme at the University of Edinburgh. In terms of the two strands of social epistemology, Fuller is more sensitive and receptive to this historical trajectory (if not always in agreement) than Goldman, whose “veritistic” social epistemology can be reasonably read as a systematic rejection of the more extreme claims associated with Kuhn and Foucault.

== Social epistemology as a field ==
In the standard sense of the term today, social epistemology is a field within analytic philosophy. It focuses on the social aspects of how knowledge is created and disseminated. What precisely these social aspects are, and whether they have beneficial or detrimental effects upon the possibilities to create, acquire and spread knowledge is a subject of continuous debate. The most common topics discussed in contemporary social epistemology are testimony (e.g. "When does a belief that 'x is true' which resulted from being told that 'x is true' constitute knowledge?"), peer disagreement (e.g. "When and how should I revise my beliefs in light of other people holding beliefs that contradict mine?"), and group epistemology (e.g. "What does it mean to attribute knowledge to groups rather than individuals, and when are such knowledge attributions appropriate?").

Within the field, "the social" is approached in two complementary and not mutually exclusive ways: "the social" character of knowledge can either be approached through inquiries in inter-individual epistemic relations or through inquiries focusing on epistemic communities. The inter-individual approach typically focuses on issues such as testimony, epistemic trust as a form of trust placed by one individual in another, epistemic dependence, epistemic authority, etc. The community approach typically focuses on issues such as community standards of justification, community procedures of critique, diversity, epistemic justice, and collective knowledge.

Social epistemology as a field within analytic philosophy has close ties to, and often overlaps with philosophy of science. While parts of the field engage in abstract, normative considerations of knowledge creation and dissemination, other parts of the field are "naturalized epistemology" in the sense that they draw on empirically gained insights---which could mean natural science research from, e.g., cognitive psychology, be that qualitative or quantitative social science research. (For the notion of "naturalized epistemology" see Willard Van Orman Quine.) And while parts of the field are concerned with analytic considerations of rather general character, case-based and domain-specific inquiries in, e.g., knowledge creation in collaborative scientific practice, knowledge exchange on online platforms or knowledge gained in learning institutions play an increasing role.

Important academic journals for social epistemology as a field within analytic philosophy are, e.g., Episteme, Social Epistemology, and Synthese. However, major works within this field are also published in journals that predominantly address philosophers of science and psychology or in interdisciplinary journals which focus on particular domains of inquiry (such as, e.g., Ethics and Information Technology).

== Major philosophers who influenced social epistemology ==
1. Plato in his dialogue Charmides
2. John Locke in problem of testimony
3. David Hume in problem of testimony
4. Thomas Reid in problem of testimony
5. Karl Marx in interrelating ideology and knowledge.
  - used by Karl Mannheim who concentrated on the social conditioning of knowledge with the reasoning that a knowledge claim's validity is restricted by the social conditions with regard to which the claim was initially made.
6. Miranda Fricker in problem of testimony

== Present and future concerns ==
In both stages, both varieties of social epistemology remain largely "academic" or "theoretical" projects. Yet both emphasize the social significance of knowledge and therefore the cultural value of social epistemology itself. A range of journals publishing social epistemology welcome papers that include a policy dimension.

More practical applications of social epistemology can be found in the areas of library science, academic publishing, guidelines for scientific authorship and collaboration, knowledge policy and debates over the role of the Internet in knowledge transmission and creation.

Social epistemology is still considered a relatively new addition to philosophy, with its problems and theories still fresh and in rapid movement. Of increasing importance is social epistemology developments within transdisciplinarity as manifested by media ecology.

== See also ==
- Bayesian epistemology
- Collaborative intelligence
- Collective intelligence
- Distributed cognition
- Double hermeneutic
- Epistemic democracy
- Epistemology
- Feminist epistemology
- Group cognition
- Intersubjectivity
- Knowledge falsification
- Shared intentionality
- Situated cognition
- Sociology of knowledge
- Social constructionism
- Social philosophy
- Reflexivity (social theory)
- Media ecology
