= Margaret Elizabeth Egan =

American librarian (1905–1959)

Margaret Elizabeth Egan (March 14, 1905 – January 26, 1959) was an American librarian and communication scholar who is best known for "Foundations of a Theory in Bibliography," published in Library Quarterly in 1952 and co-authored with Jesse Hauk Shera. This article marked the first appearance of the term "social epistemology" in connection with library science.

== Biography ==
Margaret Egan was born in Indianapolis, Indiana, in 1905. She obtained a B.A. at the University of Cincinnati in 1939 and completed graduate work at both Yale University (1940–41) and the University of Chicago (1941–43). She worked at the Cincinnati Public Library from 1933 to 1940; in 1943 Egan joined the Industrial Relations Center of the University of Chicago as librarian and began teaching in the University of Chicago Graduate Library School (GLS). She was appointed as an assistant professor in the GLS in 1946 and was an associate editor of Library Quarterly from 1952 to 1955. She left Chicago in 1955 and joined Jesse Shera at the School of Library Science at Western Reserve University in Cleveland, Ohio, where she first served as a research associate at the newly formed Center for Documentation and Communication Research. In 1956 she was appointed as an associate professor.

Egan died of a heart attack in 1959 at the age of 53.

== Social epistemology ==
Social epistemology, "the production, distribution, and utilization of intellectual products" (Egan and Shera 1952), correlates the production and consumption of information to that of material goods. Shera later wrote that social epistemology "is the study of knowledge in society," distinct from previous investigations of individual knowledge.

Furner (2004) lists the following contributions made in "Foundations of a Theory of Bibliography":

- Establishing "informed social action" as the goal of library service.
- Establishing the extent to which librarianship contributes to attaining this goal as "the primary criterion by which [bibliographic services] may be evaluated."
- Providing "a theoretical framework … for the study of information-seeking behavior, knowledge organization, and bibliometrics", which is then treated as "a theoretical foundation for library and information science."
- Using the term "social epistemology" in this context for the first time.

== Errors of attribution ==
Although Egan was the first author on "Foundations of a Theory of Bibliography," her untimely death (and Shera's prolific publishing that followed) have led to frequent omissions of her name when citing the work. In 1978, Shera wrote that "both the term and the concept [of social epistemology] were hers, but because I have given it wide currency, despite frequent disclaimers, it has generally been attributed to me."
