= Extrication morality =

Ethics theory

Extrication morality is a moral theory proposed by C.A.J. Coady which attempts to accommodate seemingly immoral actions, particularly of politicians, as a legitimate form of necessary evil.

== See also ==
- Dirty hands
- Ticking time bomb scenario
