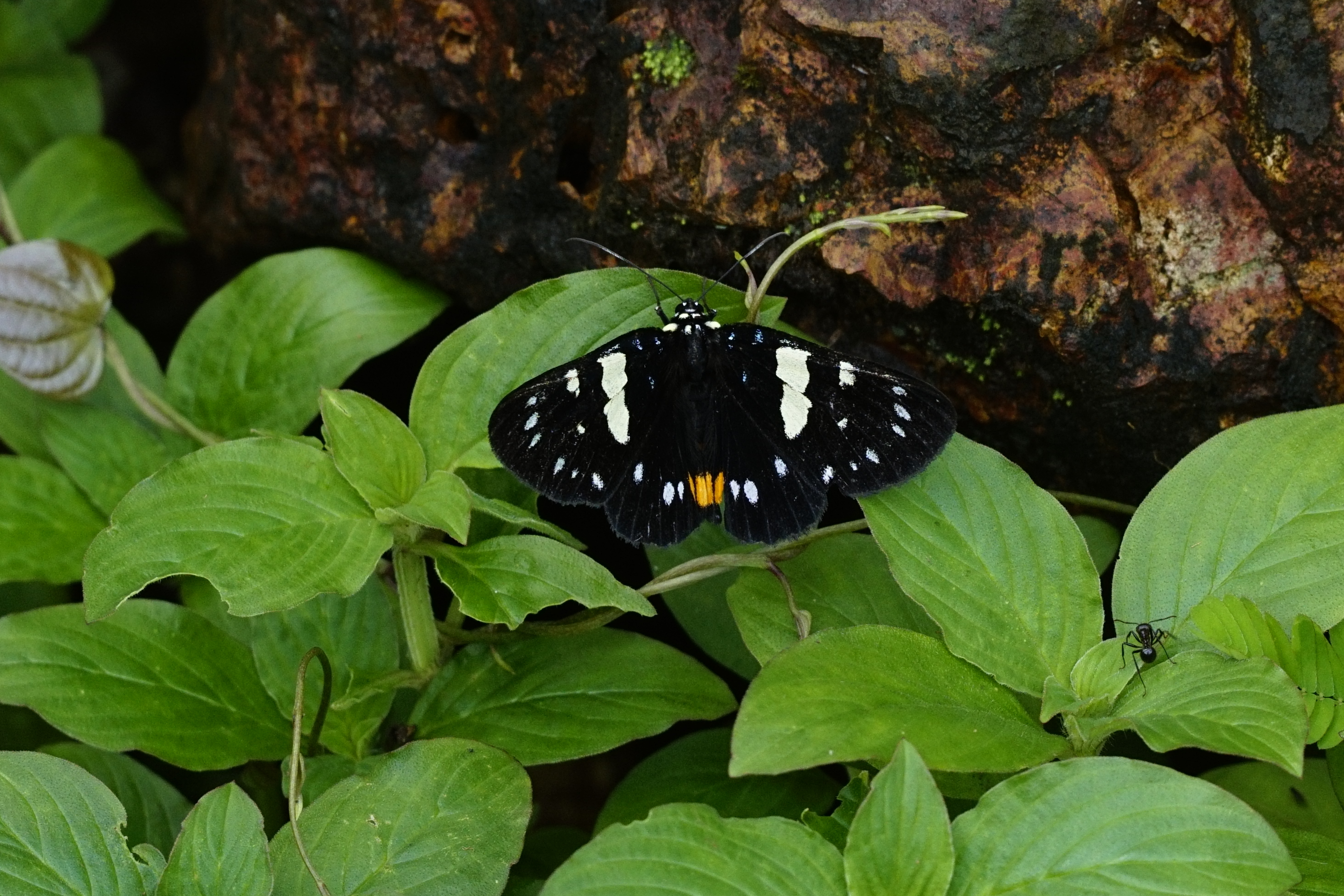

Scientific classification
- Kingdom: Animalia
- Phylum: Arthropoda
- Clade: Pancrustacea
- Class: Insecta
- Order: Lepidoptera
- Superfamily: Noctuoidea
- Family: Noctuidae
- Genus: Episteme
- Species: E. adulatrix

Binomial name
- Episteme adulatrix (Kollar, 1844)

Synonyms
- List: Eusemia adulatrix Kollar, [1844]; Eusemia bellatrix Westwood, 1848; Eusemia sectinotis Butler, 1875; Eusemia contracta Butler, 1875; Eusemia afflicta Butler, 1875; Eusemia simplex Butler, 1875; Eusemia audlatrix spinosa Jordan, 1912

= Episteme adulatrix =

Species of moth

Episteme adulatrix, the day flying moth, is a species of moth in the genus Episteme of the family Noctuidae.

== Distribution ==
This species can be found in Pakistan, India, western China, Nepal, Burma and Taiwan.

== Description ==
Episteme adulatrix has a wingspan of about 66 millimetres (2.6 in). The upperside of the forewings is black, with large yellow markings, a row of small white spots and pale blue spots at the base. The upperside of the hindwings is black, with small white submarginal spots and orange spots near the anal angle. Head, thorax and abdomen are black, abdomen with blood-red bands.

== Biology ==
It is a day flying moth (hence the common name). Caterpillars feed on Solanum tuberosum.

== Gallery ==
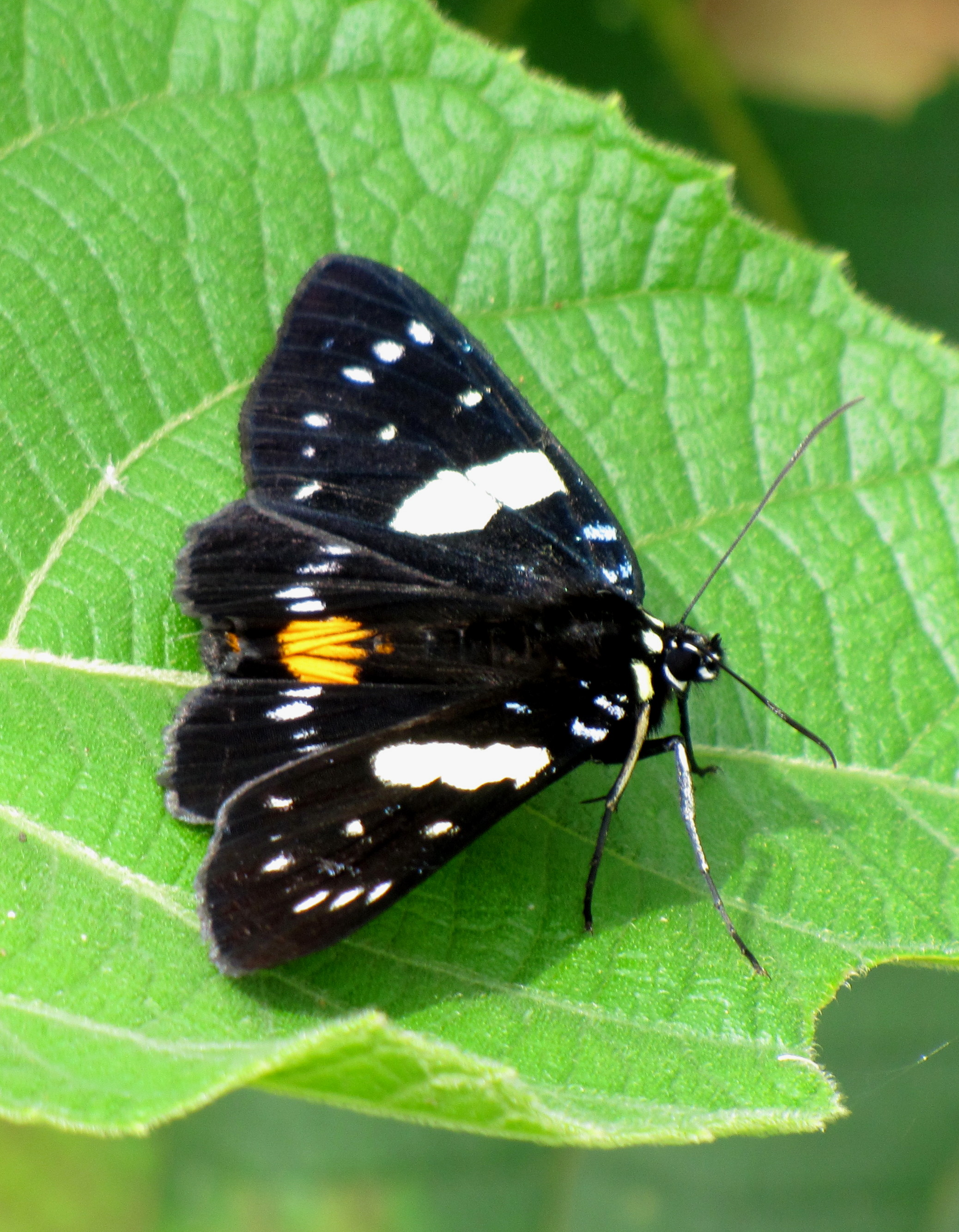
Upperside

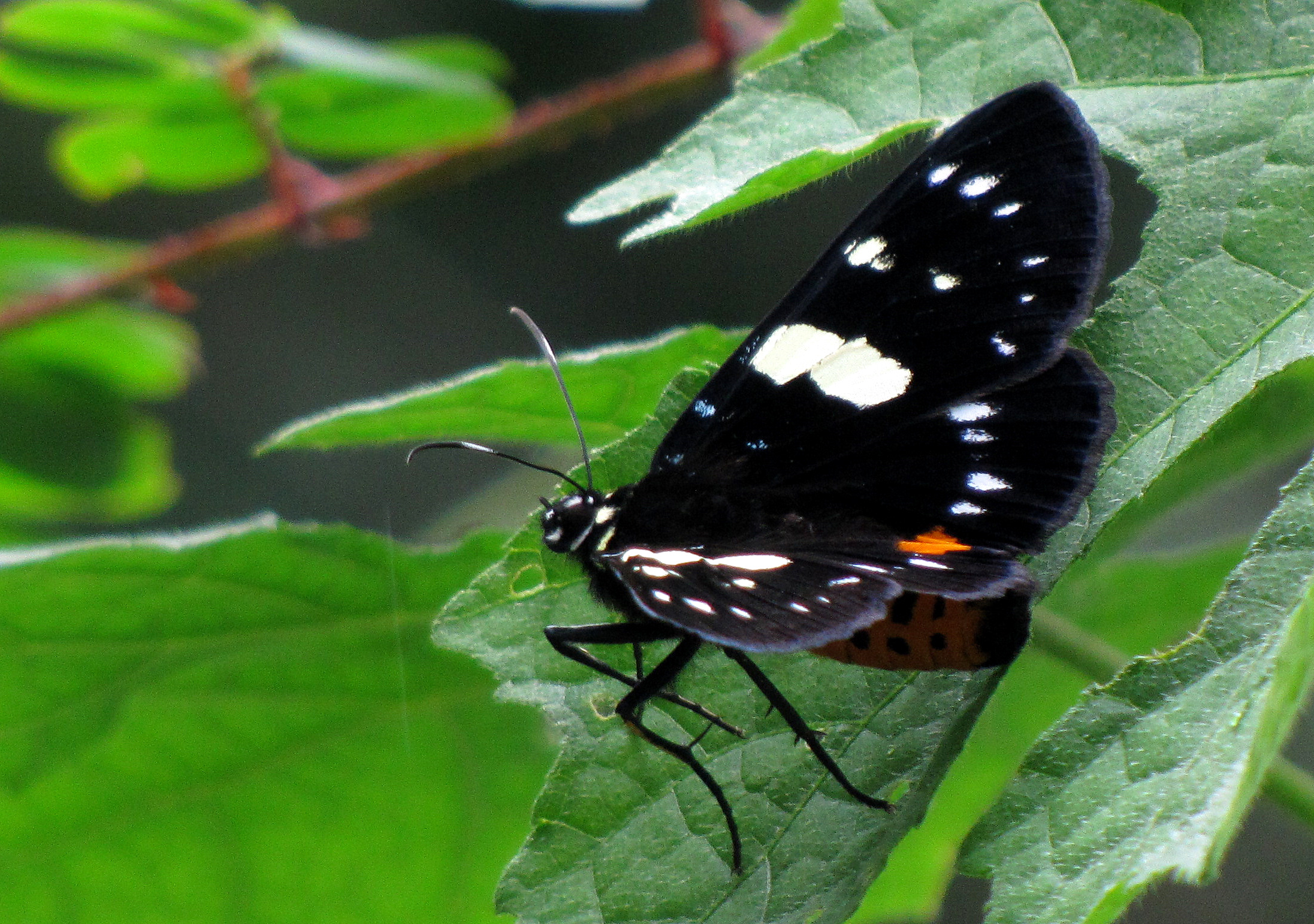

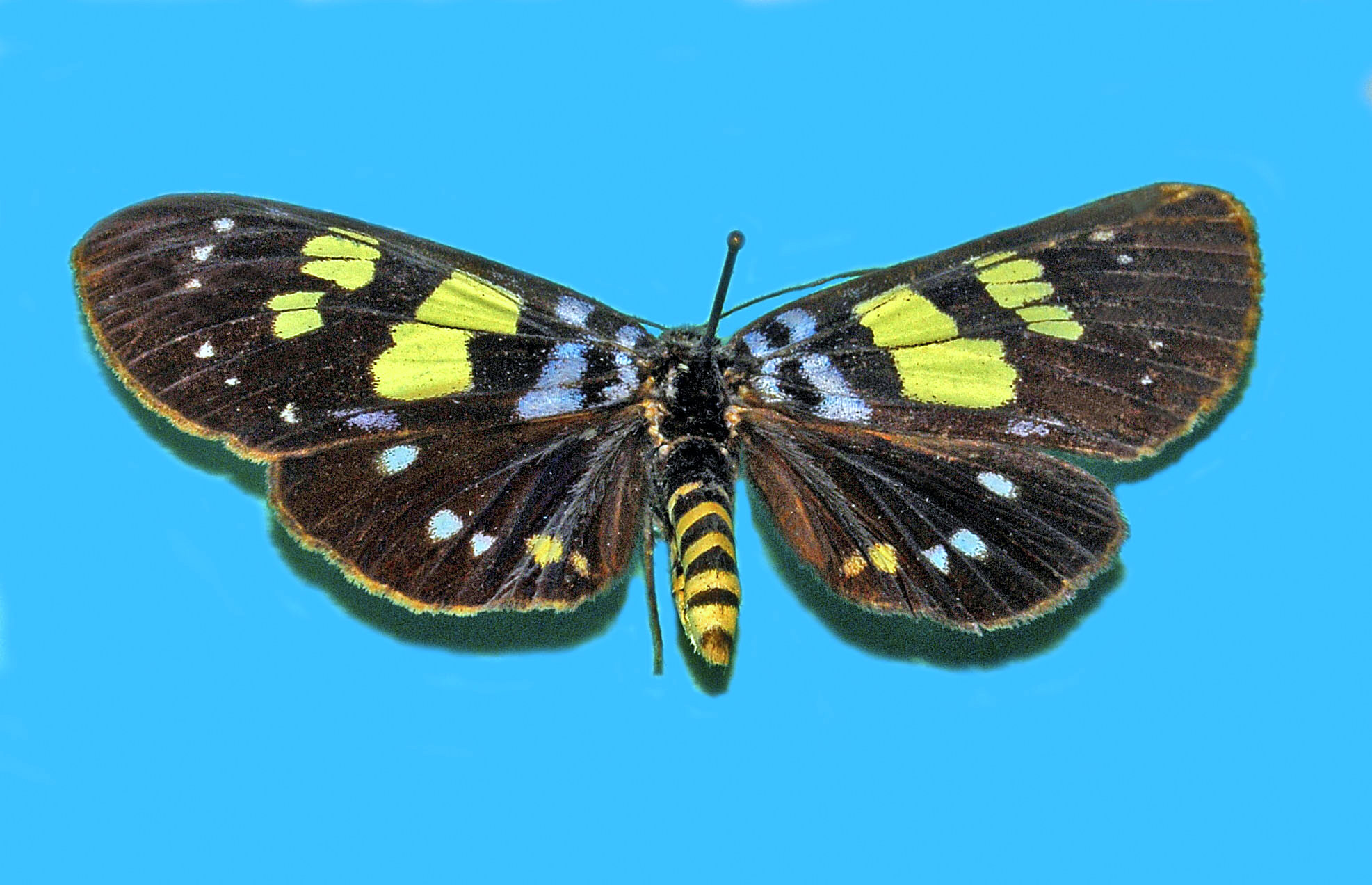
Museum specimen
