= Ralph Barton Perry =

American philosopher (1876–1957)

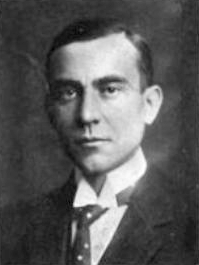
- Born: July 3, 1876; Poultney, Vermont, U.S.
- Died: January 22, 1957 (aged 80); Cambridge, Massachusetts, U.S.
- Burial place: Mount Auburn Cemetery
- Spouse: Rachel Berenson (m. 1905)
- Children: 2

Education
- Education: Princeton University; Harvard University
- Academic advisors: William James; Josiah Royce

Philosophical work
- Era: Contemporary philosophy
- Region: Western philosophy
- School: New Realism; Moral idealism
- Institutions: Harvard University
- Doctoral students: Alain Locke; Stephen C. Pepper; Henry Nelson Wieman; Donald Cary Williams
- Notable students: William K. Frankena; Charles Hartshorne; Thelma Z. Lavine; Charles L. Stevenson; Paul Weiss
- Main interests: Metaphysics, epistemology, ethics
- Notable ideas: Egocentric predicament

Ralph Barton Perry (July 3, 1876 – January 22, 1957) was an American philosopher. He was a strident moral idealist who stated in 1909 that, to him, idealism meant "to interpret life consistently with ethical, scientific, and metaphysical truth." Perry's viewpoints on religion stressed the notion that religious thinking possessed legitimacy should it exist within a framework accepting of human reason and social progress.

== Biography ==
Ralph Barton Perry was born in Poultney, Vermont on July 3, 1876. He was educated at Princeton (B.A., 1896) and at Harvard (M.A., 1897; Ph.D., 1899), where, after teaching philosophy for three years at Williams and Smith colleges, he was instructor (1902–05), assistant professor (1905–13), full professor (1913–30) and Edgar Pierce Professor of Philosophy (1930–46). He was president of the American Philosophical Association's eastern division in 1920–21. He was elected to the American Academy of Arts and Sciences in 1928 and the American Philosophical Society in 1939.

A pupil of William James, whose Essays in Radical Empiricism he edited (1912), Perry became one of the leaders of the New Realism movement. Perry argued for a naturalistic theory of value and a New Realist theory of perception and knowledge. He wrote a celebrated biography of William James, which won the 1936 Pulitzer Prize for Biography or Autobiography, and proceeded to a revision of his critical approach to natural knowledge. An active member among a group of American New Realist philosophers, he elaborated around 1910 the program of new realism. While his work continued to display the influence of William James, Perry increasingly advocated a more humanistic spirituality. Perry was an advocate of a militant democracy: in his words "total but not totalitarian". Puritanism and Democracy (1944) is a famous wartime attempt to reconcile two fundamental concepts in the origins of modern America. Between 1946 and 1948, he delivered in Glasgow his Gifford Lectures, titled Realms of Value.

He married Rachel Berenson on August 15, 1905, and they lived in Cambridge, Massachusetts. Their son was Edward Barton Perry, born at their home 5 Avon Street in Cambridge, on September 27, 1906. In 1932, Edward married Harriet Armington Seelye (born Worcester, Massachusetts, May 28, 1909), daughter of physician and surgeon Dr. Walker Clarke Seelye of Worcester and Annie Ide Barrows Seelye, formerly of Providence, Rhode Island.

In 1919, he gave the commencement address for the first graduating class of Connecticut College, which had opened its doors in 1915.

Perry died at his home in Cambridge on January 22, 1957, and was buried at Mount Auburn Cemetery.

== Selected publications ==
- The Approach to Philosophy (1905), New York, Chicago and Boston: Charles Scribner's Sons
- The Moral Economy (1909), New York: Charles Scribner's Son
- Present Philosophical Tendencies: A Critical Survey of Naturalism, Idealism, Pragmatism, and Realism, together with a Synopsis of the Philosophy of William James (1912), New York:Longmans, Green & Co.
- Holt, EB; Marvin, WT; Montague, WP; Perry, RB; Pitkin, WB; Spaulding, EG, The New Realism: Cooperative Studies in Philosophy (1912), New York: The Macmillan Company
- The Free Man and the Soldier (1916), New York: Charles Scribner's Sons
- The Present Conflict of Ideals: A Study of the Philosophical Background of the World War (1918), New York: Longmans, Green & Co.
- Annotated Bibliography of the Writings of William James (1920), Longmans, Green & Co.
- The Plattsburg movement: A Chapter of America's Participation in the World War (1921), New York: E.P. Dutton & company
- A Modernist View of National Ideals (1926) Berkeley: University of California Press, Howison Lectures in Philosophy, 1925
- General Theory of Value (1926)
- Philosophy of the Recent Past: An Outline of European and American Philosophy Since 1860 (1926), New York: Charles Scribner's Sons
- The Hope for Immortality (1935)
- The Thought and Character of William James, 2 vols. (1935)
- Plea for an Age Movement (1942) New York: The Vanguard Press [Talk at 1941 Princeton and Harvard Reunions]
- Puritanism and Democracy (1944)
- Characteristically American: Five Lectures Delivered on the William W. Cook Foundation at the University of Michigan, November–December 1948 (1949), New York: Alfred A. Knopf, 1949
- Realms of Value (1954), Harvard University Press [Based on Gifford Lectures]
- The Humanity of Man (1956), New York: George Braziller
- "A Definition of morality". In P. W. Taylor (Ed.), Problems of moral philosophy: an introduction to ethics (pp. 13–24). Belmont, CA: Dickenson, 1967

== See also ==
- American philosophy
