= William Montagu =

William Montagu may refer to:

- William Montagu, 2nd Baron Montagu (c. 1285–1319), English peer, soldier and courtier
- William Montagu, 1st Earl of Salisbury (1301–1344), English nobleman
- William de Montagu, 2nd Earl of Salisbury (1328–1397)
- William Montagu, 2nd Duke of Manchester (1700–1739)
- William Montagu, 5th Duke of Manchester (1771–1843), British peer, soldier, colonial administrator and politician
- William Montagu, 7th Duke of Manchester (1823–1890), British peer and Member of Parliament
- William Montagu, 9th Duke of Manchester (1877–1947), British peer and politician
- William Montagu (younger) (1652–1691), English MP for Midhurst and Stockbridge, imprisoned for debt
- William Montagu (judge) (1618–1706), British judge
- William Montagu (MP) (c. 1720–1757), British politician for Huntingdonshire and Bossiney
- William Augustus Montagu (c. 1785–1852), British military officer
- William Augustus Montagu (MP) (1752–1776), British politician
- William Montagu Manning (1811–1895), Australian politician

== See also ==
- William Pepperell Montague (1873–1953), philosopher
- William Montacute (disambiguation)
- Montagu Williams (1835–1892), English teacher, soldier, playwright, barrister and magistrate
