= Jens Halfwassen =

German philosopher (1958–2020)

- Born: November 16, 1958
- Died: February 14, 2020 (aged 61)

Academic background
- Education: University of Cologne (Dr. phil., habil.)
- Theses: Der Aufstieg zum Einen : Untersuchungen zu Platon und Plotin (1989); Hegel und der spätantike Neuplatonismus : Untersuchungen zur Metaphysik des Einen und des Nous in Hegels spekulativer und geschichtlicher Deutung (1995)

Academic work
- Era: Contemporary philosophy
- Region: Western philosophy
- Institutions: Heidelberg University
- Notable students: Markus Gabriel

Jens Halfwassen (November 16, 1958 Bergisch Gladbach – February 14, 2020 Heidelberg) was a German philosopher. He taught as a professor of philosophy at the University of Heidelberg. With numerous publications on Plato and Neoplatonism as well as metaphysics, he became known beyond specialist circles.

== Life and works ==
Like his siblings Insa and Peer, Jens Halfwassen was born in Bergisch Gladbach to Helga Halfwassen, née Becker, and Heinz Halfwassen (born 1929), a businessman, board member of Zanders Feinpapiere AG, councillor and managing director of the Gartensiedlung Gronauerwald. He attended the Nicolaus-Cusanus-Gymnasium there from 1969 to 1978. In April 1975, Halfwassen appeared as a 16-year-old contestant in the quiz programme Der große Preis with Wim Thoelke on the subject of ‘Louis XIV’. From 1978 to 1985, he studied philosophy, history, antiquity and education at the University of Cologne, a period that shaped his entire academic education. Halfwassen received a doctoral scholarship from the German National Academic Foundation. In 1989, he was honoured with the dissertation Der Aufstieg zum Einen. Untersuchungen zu Platon und Plotin summa cum laude. From 1990 Halfwassen was a research assistant to Klaus Düsing. In 1995, he completed his habilitation with ‘Hegel und der spätantike Neuplatonismus. Investigations into the Metaphysics of the One and the Nous in Hegel's Speculative and Historical Interpretation’. He was a senior assistant and private lecturer at the University of Cologne until 1997.

Halfwassen was Heisenberg Professor of the German Research Foundation and Professor of Philosophy at LMU Munich from 1997 to 1999. During this time, he spent a year as a research fellow at the University of Tübingen. In 1999, he was appointed to a chair in philosophy at Heidelberg University. Since then, he has been Director of the Philosophy Department there. Together with Matthias Baltes and others, he founded the Academia Platonica Septima Monasteriensis in 1999. Two years later, he established the Hans-Georg Gadamer Endowed Professorship for Humanities at Heidelberg University, which he continuously supervised and organised. In 1999, he became a member of the Hegel Commission of the North Rhine-Westphalian Academy of Sciences and Humanities, a member of the advisory board of the Gesellschaft für antike Philosophie (Society for Ancient Philosophy) and a member of the advisory board of the Internationalen Schelling-Gesellschaft (International Schelling Society). From 2001 to 2007, Halfwassen was a member of the Senate Committee for Research Affairs at Heidelberg University. Since 2007, he has been a member of the Board of Trustees of the Karl Jaspers Foundation in Basel. In the same year, he was elected Senior Fellow at the Collegium Budapest. He was a Fellow there from October 2009 to 2010. In 2012, he became head of the Karl Jaspers Centre at the Heidelberg Academy of Sciences and Humanities, of which he also became a full member in 2012. Since March 2014, he has been a Fellow of the Marsilius-Kolleg at Heidelberg University and has been working on the philosophical redefinition of the relationship between matter, determinacy and freedom. He was awarded the Rudolf Meimberg Prize of the Academy of Sciences and Literature (2003) and an honorary doctorate in philosophy from the State University of Athens (2014).

Halfwassen was co-editor of the series Quellen und Studien zur Philosophie, De Gruyter publishing, and of the journal Philosophische Rundschau, Mohr Siebeck publication. He has also worked as a reviewer for the German Research Foundation, the Alexander von Humboldt Foundation, the Fritz Thyssen Foundation, the Union of German Academies of Sciences and Humanities, the Volkswagen Foundation, the DAAD and the German National Academic Foundation, of which he has been a liaison lecturer since 2002. Among other things, he recently worked on the commentary for a bilingual edition of the testimonies to Plato's ‘Unwritten Doctrines’.

== Selected publications ==
- Der Aufstieg zum Einen. Untersuchungen zu Platon und Plotin (= Beiträge zur Altertumskunde, Band 9). B. G. Teubner Verlag, Stuttgart 1992, 422 Seiten. 2., um einen Forschungsbericht erweiterte Auflage, K. G. Saur Verlag, München und Leipzig 2006, 440 Seiten
- Speusipp und die Unendlichkeit des Einen. Ein neues Speusipp–Testimonium bei Proklos und seine Bedeutung. In: Archiv für Geschichte der Philosophie 74, 1992, S. 43–73.
- Geist und Selbstbewußtsein. Studien zu Plotin und Numenios (= Abhandlung der Akademie der Wissenschaften und der Literatur Mainz, Geistes- und Sozialwissenschaftliche Klasse, Jahrgang 1994, Nr. 10). F. Steiner Verlag, Stuttgart 1994, 71 Seiten.
- Monismus und Dualismus in Platons Prinzipienlehre. In: Bochumer Philosophisches Jahrbuch für Antike und Mittelalter 2, 1997, S. 1–21 (auch auf Englisch und Polnisch erschienen).
- Hegel und der spätantike Neuplatonismus. Untersuchungen zur Metaphysik des Einen und des Nous in Hegels spekulativer und geschichtlicher Deutung (= Hegel-Studien. Beiheft Band 40). Bouvier Verlag, Bonn 1999, 512 Seiten. 2. Auflage Hamburg: Felix Meiner Verlag 2005.
- Der Demiurg: Seine Stellung in der Philosophie Platons und seine Deutung im antiken Platonismus. In: Platons 'Timaios'. Beiträge zu seiner Rezeptionsgeschichte. Hrsg. von Ada B. Neschke-Hentschke (Bibliothèque philosophique de Louvain). Peters, Löwen und Leiden 2000, S. 39–61.
- Sein als uneingeschränkte Fülle. Zur Vorgeschichte des ontologischen Gottesbeweises im antiken Platonismus. In: Zeitschrift für philosophische Forschung 56, 2002, S. 497–516.
- Plotin und der Neuplatonismus. Beck’sche Reihe DENKER, C. H. Beck Verlag, München 2004 (Übersetzung ins Englische abgeschlossen).
- Die Unverwüstlichkeit der Metaphysik. In: Philosophische Rundschau 57, 2010, S. 97–124 (Sonderheft: Die Zukunft der Philosophie).
- Jenseits von Sein und Nichtsein: Wie kann man für Transzendenz argumentieren? In: Gottesbeweise als Herausforderung für die moderne Vernunft. Hrsg. von Thomas Buchheim, Friedrich Hermanni, Axel Hutter und Christoph Schwöbel (Collegium Metaphysicum Band 4), Mohr Siebeck, Tübingen 2012, S. 85–98.
- Auf den Spuren des Einen. Studien zur Metaphysik und ihrer Geschichte. Mohr Siebeck, Tübingen 2015, ISBN 978-3-16-154162-9.
- Seele und Materie im Neuplatonismus. Soul and Matter in Neoplatonism. Hrsg. Jens Halfwassen, Tobias Dangel und Carl O’Brien, Universitätsverlag Winter, Heidelberg, 2016.
- Neuplatonismus und Christentum. In: Intellektualität und Gnade? Das Aufeinandertreffen von Platonismus und Christentum. Hrsg. Michael Wladika, Königshausen & Neumann, Würzburg 2016, S. 84–99.
- Plotinus, Neoplatonism and the Transcendence of the One. Ed. and trans. Carl O’Brien. Franciscan University Press & Catholic University of America Press 2021. ISBN 978-1-7339889-9-5.

== Literature ==
- Otfried Höffe: Jens Halfwassen (16. 11. 1958–14. 2. 2020). In: Jahrbuch der Heidelberger Akademie der Wissenschaften für 2020. Heidelberg 2021, S. 121–125 (online).
- Thomas A. Szlezák: Jens Halfwassen † In: Gnomon. 93, 2021, S. 92–95.
- o'Brien, Carl (2020). "Jens Halfwassen, 1958-2020". The International Journal of the Platonic Tradition. 14 (2): 117–119. doi:10.1163/18725473-12341482.
- Carl O’Brien: Jens Halfwassen and the German Intellectual Tradition. In: Plotinus, Neoplatonism and the Transcendence of the One, Franciscan University Press & Catholic University of America Press 2021, xv-xxvii.
