= Documentality =

Philosophical thesis

Documentality is the theory of documents that underlies the ontology of social reality put forward by the Italian philosopher Maurizio Ferraris (see Ferraris 2007, 2008, 2009a and 2009b). The theory gives to documents a central position within the sphere of social objects, conceived as distinct from physical and ideal objects. Ferraris argues that social objects are "social acts that have been inscribed on some kind of support", be it a paper document, a magnetic support, or even memory in people's heads (e.g. in the case of the promises we make every day). Thus the constitutive rule of social objects is that Object = Inscribed Act. Therefore, documents as inscriptions possessing social relevance and value embody the essential and prototypical features of any social object, and it is on this basis that it is possible to develop an ontology capable of classifying documents and their selective storage, beginning with the grand divide between strong documents (inscriptions of acts), which make up social objects in the full sense, and weak documents (recordings of facts), which are secondary derivatives and of lesser importance. This theory is inspired, on the one hand, by the reflection on the centrality of writing developed by Jacques Derrida (1967, 1972) and, on the other hand, by the theory of social acts devised by Adolf Reinach (1913) and the theory of linguistic acts by John L. Austin (1962).

== Searle: X counts as Y in C ==
In the contemporary debate, one of the main theories of social objects has been proposed by the American philosopher John R. Searle, in particular in his book The Construction of Social Reality (1995). Searle's ontology recognizes the sphere of social objects, defining them as higher order objects with respect to physical objects, in accordance with the rule

X counts as Y in C

meaning that the physical object X, for instance a colored piece of paper, counts as Y, a 10 euro banknote, in context C, the Europe of the year 2010. According to Searle, from the iteration of this simple rule the whole complexity of social reality is derived.

Powerful it may be, the theory runs – according to Ferraris – into problems. Firstly, it is not at all obvious how, from the physical object, we manage to get to the social object. If any physical object really can constitute the origin of a social object, then it is not clear what would prevent every physical object to turn into a social object. But clearly it is not the case that, for instance, if you decide to draw a banknote, you thereby produce a banknote. The standard theory relies on key notion of "collective intentionality" to explain the transfiguration of X in Y. However, such a notion – as Ferraris argues – is not at all as clear as it purports to be.

Secondly, how does the reversibility from the social to the physical sphere work? It is fairly intuitive to assert that a banknote is also a piece of paper, or that a President is also a person. As much as it is true that when Searle is alone in a hotel room there is only one physical object, but many social objects (a husband, an employee of the state of California, an American citizen, a driving license holder etc.). In this case, the passage back from Y (the social) to X (the physical) goes smoothly. However, things change in different, although not very peculiar, situations. How should we deal with vague or vast entities, such as a State, a battle, a university? And how about negative entities, such as debts?

== The roots of documentality ==
Three philosophical theses – inspired, respectively, by the work of the German phenomenologist Adolf Reinach, the Peruvian economist Hernando de Soto, and the French philosopher Jacques Derrida – shape the theory of Documentality.

=== The speech acts thesis ===
According to the Speech Act Thesis – stemming more from the theory of social acts devised in 1913 by the German phenomenologist Adolf Reinach than from the writings of Austin and Searle – through the performance of speech acts (acts of promising, marrying, accusing, baptizing) we change the world by bringing into being claims, obligations, rights, relations of authority, debts, permissions, names, and a variety of other sorts of entities, thus making up the ontology of the social world. Given that speech acts are evanescent, the physical basis for the temporally extended existence of its products are – in small societies and in simple social interactions – memory traces and other psychological features of the people involved in these acts; and – in large societies and in more complex social interactions – documents. Documents are the physical entities, which create and sustain the sorts of enduring and re-usable deontic powers that extend human memory, and thereby create and sustain the new and more complex forms of social order, which are characteristic of modern civilization.

=== The "de Soto thesis" ===
According to a thesis rooted in the works of de Soto (2000) (see also Smith 2003, 2008), economic development can be boosted by a documental development. Through the performance of document acts (acts of filling in, registering, conveying, validating, attaching), we change the world by bringing into being ownership relations, legal accountability, business organizations, and a variety of other institutional orders of modern societies. As stock and share certificates create capital, so statutes of incorporation create companies. As identity documents create identities (the sorts of things which can be the objects of an identity theft), so diplomas create academic ranks. Where for de Soto, it is commercial paper documents which create what he calls the "invisible infrastructure of asset management [...] upon which the astonishing fecundity of Western capitalism rests" Ferraris goes further and asserts that documents, both in paper and in electronic form, create the invisible infrastructure of contemporary social reality.

=== The "Derrida thesis" ===
Derrida (1967) elaborated a philosophy of writing that finds its most correct application in the social sphere. Concerning speech acts, Derrida (1972) observes that they are mostly inscribed acts, since without records of some sort the performatives would not produce social objects such as conferences, marriages, graduation ceremonies, or constitutions. The point is simple, if we imagine a graduation or a wedding ceremony in which there are no registers and testimonies, it is difficult to maintain that a husband, a wife, or a graduate has been produced. This amounts to saying that social objects turn out to be (as much as the ideal ones) closely linked to the forms of their inscription and recording. However, Derrida was wrong – according to Ferraris (2005; 2009) – in claiming that "nothing exists outside the text". Actually physical and ideal objects exist independently from every recording, as independently from there being humanity. This is not the case for social objects, which depend closely on records and the existence of humanity. It is in this sense that, by weakening Derrida's thesis, Ferraris proposed to develop a social ontology starting from the intuition that nothing social exists outside the text. Keeping this in mind, Ferraris advances an innovative approach to social ontology called Documentality.

== Context and history ==
The most influential ontology of social reality, formulated by the American philosopher John Searle (1995), is based on collective intentionality, which allegedly ensures that certain physical objects (e.g. a piece of paper) are transformed into social objects (e.g. a banknote). As noted by Barry Smith (2003), this perspective has difficulty in accounting for both negative entities – such as debts, which apparently do not have a physical counterpart – and the new, seemingly intangible, social objects generated by the Web. The theory of documentality proposed by Maurizio Ferraris (2005) aims to solve these problems by arguing that social objects are always recordings of social acts. This accounts for both negative entities and the virtual entities of the web, which consist precisely of recordings just like any other social object. For the theory of documentality, the constitutive rule of social reality is "Object = Inscribed Act", where "inscribed" is equal to "recorded". That is: a social object is the result of a social act (such as to involve at least two people), which is characterized by its being recorded on some support, including the minds of the people involved in the act (in the case of informal social acts such as promises) . Articulated by Ferraris (2009) in a complete ontological theory and by Smith ( 2012) in a theory of document acts, documentality has three main reasons of interest. First, it has been able to account for the substantial growth of documents and recording devices in the Web world, which is very well explained by the proposed constitutive law of social reality. Secondly, it has been able to explain why social reality, while requiring the presence of subjects for the enactment of acts, may develop independently from them and even without their knowledge (an economic recession can be taking place even if no human subject is aware of it). Third, instead of making social reality depend on the action of collective intentionality – with an increasing social constructivism (Searle 2010) – documentality is capable of substantiating a "new realism" (Ferraris, 2012) that helps continental philosophy come out of the impasses of postmodernism and reconnect with analytic philosophy. [Source of this description of Documentality: L. Caffo, "From Documentality to New Realism", in The Monist, 97:2 April 2014].

== Ferraris: object = inscribed act ==
According to the ontologist Barry Smith (forthcoming), with documentality, Ferraris advances an innovative approach to social ontology that implies three steps.

=== First step: the recognition of the sphere of social objects ===
The first step is the recognition – on the ground of the theories developed by Smith himself, (see in particular Smith 1999) – of the sphere of social objects, meaning, entities such as money, artworks, marriages, divorces and joint custody, years in prison and mortgages, the cost of oil and the tax codes, the Nuremberg Trial and the Swedish Academy of Sciences, and still, economic crises, research projects, lectures and university degrees etc. These objects fill up our world more than stones, trees and coconuts do, and they are more important for us, given that a good part of our happiness or unhappiness depends on them.

=== Second step: the identification of the law of constitution of social objects ===
The second step is the identification of the law that brings social objects into being, namely that

Object = Inscribed Act

What this means is that a social object is the result of a social act (one that involves at least two persons or a person and a deputed machine), which is characterized by the fact of being registered on a piece of paper, a computer file or some other digital support, or even, simply, in the heads of persons.

As Smith recognizes, if taken literally, the OBJECT=Inscribed Act formulation does not make sense. For instance, if taken literally, this formulation implies that the US Constitution "is made of tiny oxidizing heaps of ink marks on parchment, and matters are helped only slightly if we add together all the printed and digital copies of the US Constitution and assert that the US Constitution is the mereological sum of all these multiple inscriptions."

=== Third step: the individuation of the sphere of documentality ===
On the basis of the first two steps it is possible to develop an ontology capable of classifying documents and their selective storage, beginning with the grand divide between what Ferraris calls "strong documents" (inscriptions of acts), which make up social objects in the full sense, and "weak documents" (recordings of facts), which are secondary derivatives and of lesser importance. The third step thus leads to the individuation of the sphere of Documentality, understood as the search for and the definition of the properties that constitute the necessary and sufficient conditions for the being of a social object.

== Documentality in eleven theses ==
The theory of Documentality has been summarized by his author (Ferraris 2009a) in eleven fundamental theses:

1. Ontology catalogues the world of life.
The philosophy that guides this project is a descriptive metaphysics of a realist type, which aims to account for the social world and everyday experience, which is to say, the world that stands outside the range of the natural sciences. Its model is the catalogue. The sort of understanding proposed requires in the first instance the identification, classification and distinction of what there is in this world, how it is ordered, and how it is to be distinguished from the other things that there are.

2. There are three types of objects: natural (or physical), ideal, and social.
Objects come in three kinds: (1) physical objects (mountains, rivers, human bodies, and animals) that exist in space and time and are independent from the subjects who know them, even if they may have been built by them, as with artifacts (chairs, screwdrivers); (2) ideal objects (numbers, theorems, relations) that exist outside of space and time and are independent from the subjects who know them, but which, after having been discovered, can be socialized (for instance, a theorem can be published: still, it is the publication, not the theorem, that has a beginning in time); (3) social objects, that do not exist as such in space, since their physical presence is limited to the inscription (money is such because of what is written on the coin, on the banknote, on the memory of the credit card), but endure in time, and whose existence depends on the subjects who know, or at least can use, them and who, in certain cases, have constituted them. This latter circumstance displays how social objects, for which construction is necessary, depend on social acts, whose inscription constitutes the object.

3. Ontology is distinct from epistemology.
As a point of methodology, it is necessary to outline a distinction between ontology and epistemology. The former concerns what there is independently of how we know it and of whether we know it or not. The latter is knowledge of what there is, or rather, what we are justified in believing in a given context. These two dimensions have often been confused, as we can see from the way we often make depend the being of objects on our knowledge of them.

4. Social objects depend on subjects, but are not subjective.
The external world, understood in the first instance as the world of natural objects, is independent of conceptual schemes and perceptual apparatuses. In the same way, there is no continuous and necessary link that leads from perception to experience and from there to science, nor, on the other hand, knowledge is the main activity within our experience. In the world of social objects, by contrast, belief determines being, given that these objects depend on subjects. This does not mean that things like promises and money have a purely subjective dimension. Rather, it means that, unless there were subjects capable of recognizing social objects, such social objects would not exist.

5. The constitutive rule of social objects is "Object = Inscribed Act".
It thus becomes possible to develop an ontology and an epistemology of social objects. The epistemology renews the tradition of the sciences of the spirit, defining itself as a "science of the letter", given the importance that inscriptions are endowed within the construction of social reality. Ontology is a theory of social objects, namely those that obey the constitutive rule "Object = Inscribed Act". That is to say, social objects are the result of social acts (and involve at least two persons) characterized by the fact of being inscribed: on paper, in a computer file or even simply in the heads of persons.

6. There is nothing social outside the text.
The importance attributed to inscription is the characteristic feature of the theory of Documentality. The underlying idea is that the act is performed so as to produce an object; it is necessary that it be registered. A marriage or a promise that weren't inscribed, would not be an object, whereas a mountain can easily exist without being registered. In this sense, we do not hold that "there is nothing outside the text" (given that natural and ideal objects exist without inscriptions), but only that "there is nothing social outside the text".

7. Society is not based on communication but on registration.
Because nothing social exists outside the text, papers, archives and documents constitute the fundamental elements of the social world. Society is not based on communication but on registration, which is the condition for the creation of social objects. Human beings grow as human beings and socialize through registration. Naked life is nothing but a remote starting point and culture begins very early making for a clothed life, which is manifested in registrations and imitations: languages, behaviors and rites. This explains why writing is so important and, even more, "archinscription", which is the realm of registration, that precedes and includes writing in its proper or current meaning.

8. The mind is a surface that collects inscriptions.
As regards a theory of mind, social ontology is based on icnology, which is to say, a theory of traces (it is important to distinguish icnology as the science of traces from ichnology as a branch of geology). The representation of the mind as a tabula or a writing surface is not a mere metaphor, but captures the fact that perceptions and thoughts come to us as inscriptions in our mind. But the mind is not just an inscribed surface, it is also capable of grasping inscriptions, namely the traces that there are in the world, on the surface that is before us in experience. We can make out an ascending hierarchy that takes in traces (any incision on a background), registrations (traces in the mind as a tabula) and inscriptions in the technical sense (traces available to at least two persons).

9. Documents in the strong sense are inscriptions of acts.
Considered as a theory of society, the ontology of social objects configures Documentality as a theory of documents as the highest form of social objects. The analysis of documents can be articulated into the analysis of documents in the strong sense, as inscriptions of acts, and that of documents in the weak sense, as registrations of facts. Documents can have practical purposes or they can be mainly directed to the evocation of sentiments. In the latter case, we have artworks, understood as those entities that pretend to be persons.

10. The letter is the foundation of the spirit.
As a theory of culture, the ontology of social objects becomes a phenomenology of the letter: no product of the spirit could exist without letter, registration and document; and, more radically, spirit itself finds the condition of its possibility in the letter and in the inscriptions that constitute us as social beings.

11. The individuality shows itself in the signature.
As a theory of the subject, the ontology of social objects is divided into three parts: a theory of idiom, of style, and of signature. In particular, the signature is the principle of individuation insofar as it is a way to publicly represent the presence and the identity of the subject.

== Documentality applied to other disciplines ==
Documentality theory has been used in geopolitics and state theory as part of theory of understanding how nonphysical states can be established. States are precisely the kinds of entities documentality can help understand, because, it has been argued that states do not fit within the traditional Platonist duality of the concrete and the abstract, instead, belonging to a third category, the quasi-abstract. Quasi-abstract objects have received attention from social ontologists of all kinds, including documentary scholars as a response to those social entities that do not fit Searle's "X counts as Y" formulation. It is argued that document acts, as understood by documentary theory can establish states and thereby bring about their existence, as well as manipulate them in various ways (such as surrendering them after a war).

== See also ==
- Applied Ontology
- Speech act
- Citationality
- Collective belief
- Deontological Ethics
- Document
- Money
- Social constructivism
- Value-form and Value criticism

== Bibliography ==
- Austin, J.L. 1962, How to do things with Words: The William James Lectures delivered at Harvard University in 1955, J.O. Urmson (ed.), Oxford, Clarendon.
- Casetta, E. 2010, Note in margine a Documentalità. Perché è necessario lasciar tracce di Maurizio Ferraris, "Biblioteca della libertà", XLV (2010), settembre-dicembre, n. 199 online: 1-12.
- de Soto, H. 2000, The Mystery of Capital: Why Capitalism Triumphs in the West and Fails Everywhere Else, New York, Basic Books.
- Derrida, J. 1967, De la grammatologie, Paris, Ed. de Minuit.
- Derrida, J. 1972, Signature, événement, contexte, in Id., Marges de la philosophie, Paris, Ed. de Minuit.
- Ferraris, M. 2005, Dove Sei? Ontologia del telefonino, Milano, Bompiani. (En: 2013, Where are you?, Fordham UP)
- Ferraris, M. 2007, Documentality or Why Nothing Social Exists Beyond the Text, in Ch. Kanzian and E. Runggaldier (eds.), Cultures. Conflict — Analysis — Dialogue, Proceedings of the 29th International Ludwig Wittgenstein-Symposium in Kirchberg, Austria, Publications of the Austrian Ludwig Wittgenstein Society, New Series, 3: 385-401.
- Ferraris, M. 2008, Science of Recording, in H. Hrachovec and A. Pichler (eds.), Philosophy of the Information Society, Proceedings of the 30th International Ludwig Wittgenstein-Symposium in Kirchberg 2007, Frankfurt/a.M., Ontos Verlag: 110-123.
- Ferraris, M. 2009a, Documentalità. Perché è necessario lasciar tracce, Roma-Bari, Laterza. (En: 2013, Documentality, Fordham UP)
- Ferraris, M. 2009b, Documentality or Europe, "The Monist", 92: 286-314.
- Mulligan, K. (ed.) 1987, Speech Act and Sachverhalt. Reinach and the Foundations of Realist Phenomenology, Dordrecht, Martinus Nijhoff.
- Reinach, A. 1913, Die apriorischen Grundlagen des bürgerlichen Rechtes, "Jahrbuch für Philosophie und phänomenologische Forschung", I/2: 685-847; eng. transl. The Apriori Foundations of the Civil Law, "Aletheia. An International Journal of Philosophy", 3 (1983): 1-142.
- Searle, J. 1995, The Construction of Social Reality, New York, Free Press.
- Smith, B. 1999, Les objects sociaux, http://www.erudit.org/revue/philoso/1999/v26/n2/004987ar.html, "Philosophiques", 26/2: 315-47; eng. version http://ontology.buffalo.edu/document_ontology/.
- Smith, B. 2003 "John Searle: From Speech Acts to Social Reality", in Barry Smith (ed.), John Searle, Cambridge: Cambridge University Press, 1–33.
- Smith, B. 2008, "Searle and De Soto: The New Ontology of the Social World", Barry Smith, David Mark and Isaac Ehrlich (eds.), The Mystery of Capital and the Construction of Social Reality, Chicago: Open Court, 35-51.
- Smith, B. 2012, "How to do Things with Documents", Rivista di Estetica, 50, 179-198; lecture given on the occasion of the award of the Paolo Bozzi Prize for Ontology, April 15, 2010, Torino (Italy).
- Smith, B. 2013 "Document Acts", in Anita Konzelmann-Ziv, Hans Bernhard Schmid (eds.), 2013. Institutions, Emotions, and Group Agents.Contributions to Social Ontology (Philosophical Studies Series), Dordrecht: Springer
- Torrengo, G. 2009, Documenti e Intenzioni. La Documentalità nel dibattito contemporaneo sull'ontologia sociale, "Rivista di Estetica", 42: 157-188.
