= William Pepperell Montague =

American philosopher (1873–1953)

William Pepperell Montague (11 November 1873 – 1 August 1953) was an American philosopher of the New Realist school. Montague stressed the difference between his philosophical peers as adherents of either "objective" and "critical realism".

Montague was born in Chelsea, Massachusetts. He earned his bachelors, masters, and doctorate from Harvard University. He was professor of philosophy at UC Berkeley between 1899 and 1903, and at Columbia University from 1903 to 1947. He was president of the American Philosophical Association's eastern division in the years 1923–1924. He died in New York City.

Montague was an advocate of panpsychism and proposed his own variant known as hylopsychism which developed the connection between energy and mind, contending that the physical manifestation of mind occurs as potential energy.

== Works ==
- "PROFESSOR ROYCE'S REFUTATION OF REALISM", Philosophical Review 11 (1902): 43–55.
- Holt, Edwin B; Marvin, Walter T; Montague, William P; Perry, Ralph B; Pitkin, Walter B; Spaulding, Edward G. The New Realism: Cooperative Studies in Philosophy (1912)
- The Ways of Knowing or the Methods of Philosophy (1925)
- Belief Unbound, a Promethean Religion for the Modern World (1930)
- WP Montague and GP Adams, eds. Contemporary American Philosophy: Personal Statements (1930). Two Volumes. Vol. II
- The Chances of Surviving Death (1934)
- The Ways of Things: A Philosophy of Knowledge, Nature and Value (1940)
- Great Visions of Philosophy (1950)

== See also ==
- American philosophy
- Kratocracy
