= Episteme maculatrix =

Scientific classification
- Kingdom: Animalia
- Phylum: Arthropoda
- Class: Insecta
- Order: Lepidoptera
- Superfamily: Noctuoidea
- Family: Noctuidae
- Genus: Episteme
- Species: E. maculatrix

Binomial name
- Episteme maculatrix Westwood, 1841

Species of moth

Episteme maculatrix is a species of moth of the family Noctuidae. It was described by John O. Westwood in 1841.
