= Michael Wladika =

Austrian philosopher (born 1967)

- Born: April 22, 1967 (age 59)

Academic background
- Education: University of Vienna (Dr. phil., habil.)
- Theses: Selbstgewißheit und Gotteserkenntnis : die Philosophie Descartes ̀im Lichte Hegels ; Grundzüge des vom gegenwärtigen Zeitalter vergessenen Begriffs seiner selbst (1995); Formen neuzeitlichen Denkens : systematische Studien zu Descartes (2004)

Academic work
- Era: Contemporary philosophy
- Region: Western philosophy
- School or tradition: Hegelianism
- Institutions: International Theological Institute

Michael Wladika (born April 22, 1967, in Vienna) is an Austrian Roman Catholic philosopher and university professor and dean of the International Theological Institute (ITI) in Trumau.

== Life ==
Michael Wladika was born in 1967 Vienna and attended Volksschule in Dornbirn from 1973 to 1977 and Bundesgymnasium Dornbirn from 1977 to 1985, where he earned his Matura. He then studied philosophy and English at the University of Vienna, where he was awarded a master's degree in philosophy in 1991. In 1995 he earned his doctorate in philosophy with a Dissertation on Selbstgewissheit und Gotteserkenntnis. He subsequently worked as a research assistant in philosophy at the universities of Heidelberg and Vienna. In July 2004, he completed his habilitation in philosophy at the University of Vienna under Jens Halfwassen. From 2006 to 2009, he was a private lecturer in the Department of Philosophy at the Faculty of Theology at Heidelberg University. Since September 2009, he has been a professor of philosophy at the International Theological Institute ITI in Trumau. In 2020, he was appointed full professor and also took over the chair of Christian philosophy. In addition, he is a university lecturer at the Institute of Philosophy at the University of Vienna and a visiting professor of philosophy at the Benedict XVI Philosophical-Theological University in Heiligenkreuz. Since August 2023, he has also served as dean and vice-rector of the International Theological Institute ITI in Trumau.

== Research focus ==
Wladika is considered an expert on Plato's philosophy and also deals with the philosophy of Descartes and German idealism. He has organized various conferences covering both philosophical and theological topics.

== Publications ==
- Kant in Hegels Wissenschaft der Logik. Berlin 1995, ISBN 978-3-631-48042-7
- mit Günter Danhel (Hg.): Kirchliche Verlobung. Reflexionen und Impulse. Heiligenkreuz 2012, ISBN 978-3-902694-44-7
- Von Platon bis Rilke. Aufsätze zur Geschichte der Philosophie. Würzburg 2016, ISBN 978-3-8260-5992-6
- Von Aristoteles bis St. Johannes Paul II. Aufsätze zu philosophiegeschichtlichen und systematischen Entwicklungen. Würzburg 2025, ISBN 978-3-8260-9097-4
