= William Montacute =

William Montacute or William de Montacute may refer to:

- William de Montacute, 2nd Baron Montacute (c. 1285–1319)
- William Montacute, 1st Earl of Salisbury (1301–1344)
- William Montacute, 2nd Earl of Salisbury (1328–1397)

== See also ==
- William Montagu (disambiguation)
