= Egocentric predicament =

Egocentric predicament, a term coined by Ralph Barton Perry in a 1910 article, is the problem of not being able to view reality outside of our own perceptions.

== Overview ==
All worldly knowledge takes the form of mental representations that our mind examines in different ways. Direct contact with reality cannot be made outside of our own minds; therefore, we cannot be sure reality even exists. This means that we are each limited to our own perceptual world and views. Solipsism is an extension of this which assumes that only one's own mind is sure to exist.

Since 1710, when George Berkeley broached in his fashion the problem of the egocentric predicament, denying the existence of material substance except as ideas in the minds of perceivers, and thus asserting a problematical relation with reality, hence has this thesis proved a stumbling block.

After we came out of the church, we stood talking for some time together of Bishop Berkeley's ingenious sophistry to prove the non-existence of matter, and that every thing in the universe is merely ideal. I observed, that though we are satisfied his doctrine is not true, it is impossible to refute it. I never shall forget the alacrity with which Johnson answered, striking his foot with mighty force against a large stone, till he rebounded from it, 'I refute it thus.'

— Boswell's Life of Samuel Johnson

Samuel Johnson is well known for his "refutation" of Bishop Berkeley's immaterialism, his claim that matter did not actually exist but only seemed to exist: during a conversation with Boswell, Johnson powerfully stomped a nearby stone and proclaimed of Berkeley's theory, "I refute it thus!"

Both Perry's concept and the term he used influenced American philosopher, Everett W. Hall to create the solecism "the categorio-centric predicament" to express the impossibility of seeing the world outside the "categories" imposed by one's native language and conceptual scheme.

== See also ==
- Cartesian doubt
- Idealism
- New realism
- Phaneron
- Philosophical skepticism
- Relativism

== Notes ==
=== Works cited ===
- Bate, Walter Jackson (1977). Samuel Johnson. New York: Harcourt Brace Jovanovich. ISBN 978-0-15-179260-3.
- Boswell, James (1986). Hibbert, Christopher (ed.). The Life of Samuel Johnson. New York: Penguin Classics. ISBN 978-0-14-043116-2.
