= Episteme nigripennis =

Scientific classification
- Domain: Eukaryota
- Kingdom: Animalia
- Phylum: Arthropoda
- Class: Insecta
- Order: Lepidoptera
- Superfamily: Noctuoidea
- Family: Noctuidae
- Genus: Episteme
- Species: E. nigripennis

Binomial name
- Episteme nigripennis (Butler, 1875)

Synonyms
- Eusemia nigripennis Butler, 1875

Species of moth

Episteme nigripennis is a moth of the family Noctuidae first described by Arthur Gardiner Butler in 1875. It is found in Sri Lanka.
