= Jesse Shera =

American librarian (1903–1982)

- Born: 8 December 1903
- Died: 1982
- Occupations: Information scientist, library scientist
- Awards: ALA Medal of Excellence (1968); Joseph W. Lippincott Award (1973); American Library Association Honorary Membership (1976)

Jesse Hauk Shera (December 8, 1903 – March 8, 1982) was an American librarian and information scientist who pioneered the use of information technology in libraries and played a role in the expansion of its use in other areas throughout the 1950s, 60s, and 70s.

== Early life and education ==
He was born in Oxford, Ohio on December 8, 1903, the only child of parents Charles, and Jessie Shera. His hometown of Oxford was a farming community and the home of Miami University. Shera went to William McGuffey High School, and graduated in 1921. While attending high school he played the drums in the school band, was a member of the debate team, a cheerleader, and he was the senior class president. He lived in Oxford until after he obtained his undergraduate degree from Miami University. In 1925 Miami University awarded Shera with a B.A. in English with honors. Shera later went on to earn a master's degree in English literature from Yale University in 1927 and a Doctorate from the University of Chicago Graduate Library School in 1944, advised by Louis Round Wilson with Pierce Butler on his committee.

Shera suffered from strabismus throughout his life.

== Career ==
In 1928, Shera returned to Miami University and took a temporary job in the library as an assistant cataloguer and later in the year took a job as a research associate and bibliographer with the Scripps Foundation for Research in Population Problems. He remained a part of this project through 1938. Shera hoped to become a college English teacher but never succeeded due to the depression and a lack of available teaching positions in colleges and universities. "In what he has called 'an act of desperation on my part which the library profession has lived to regret,' he decided to make librarianship his career."

In the thirties, Shera was trying to convince the ALA Bulletin to be a more serious journal, and for librarians to be more careful and precise in how they answered patron questions. In short, he was concerned with their level of professionalism. At that particular time, there was no "professional creed", and this upset him, also.

He studied and wrote on the history and philosophy of libraries often, and considered the work of libraries to be one of humanistic endeavor.

As early as 1935, he was suggesting that college libraries should develop collective purchasing and interlibrary loan systems. In addition, he suggested using microforms for the same purposes that services like LexisNexis would eventually be created to perform cooperative cataloging, and reference.

From the very beginning of his career, Shera seemed to be entirely comfortable with whatever type of controversy came to hand. On librarian "neutrality", Shera warned in a 1935 address to the college and University Section of the American Library Association

" … Today we can ill afford to stand mutely behind our circulation desks, calmly handing out reserved books at the beck and call of an endless stream of students, blandly reaffirming our convictions of our own "academic detachment." We may be rudely awakened some morning with the realization that we are the hapless and unwilling guardians of the propaganda of a fascist regime.

In 1940, Shera accepted an appointment with the Library of Congress as chief of the census library project. The next year he transferred to the Office of Strategic Services, where he was deputy chief of the central information division of the research and analysis branch. In 1944 the same year Shera obtained his Doctorate in library science, he was named the associate director of libraries for the University of Chicago. Throughout his time in this position Shera was the head of the preparations division, and then of readers' services. He became a member of the University of Chicago Graduate Library School (GLS) faculty as an assistant professor in 1947. Four years later he was promoted to associate professor.

In 1949 Shera's first book Foundations for the Public Library; The Origins of the Public Library Movement in New England, 1629–1855, was published by the University of Chicago Press. This book is generally accepted as a classic discussion of the social factors contributing to the emergence of tax-supported public libraries.

From 1950 to 1952, Shera was the chairman of the American Library Association's committee on bibliography. In 1952 Shera became dean of the library school of Western Reserve University, expanding its faculty and adding a doctoral program within a few years. Under his leadership, the library school at Western Reserve became a leading contributor to the automation of libraries over the next three decades. According to an excerpt from the Saturday Review (December 1, 1956) found in the Current Biography, Shera suggests that "through the use of many machines we are at the beginning of a new era: an age which may bring quite unheard of ways for the more effective communication of knowledge".

Also in 1952, Shera took over as head of the American Documentation Institute (ADI) (which continues as the Association for Information Science & Technology). Prior to 1952, the ADI had been focused on refining the use of microfilm for the preservation and organization of documents; Shera turned its attention to applications of information technology. In 1955 Shera teamed with James W. Perry and Allen Kent to found the Center for Documentation and Communication Research (CDCR), which advised industry, government and higher education on information systems. This center was the first of its kind to be associated with any library school, and became a resource for the research into new areas of education for library schools.

In the 1960s, Shera designed a proposal for his project of "Social Epistemology", building on the work of Douglas Waples of the Graduate Library School at Chicago. Waples dealt with social effects of reading, and asked the basic questions of the new discipline that Shera named social epistemology. This new discipline is a study of the ways in which society can access and perceive its environment or information. It can also provide a framework for the production, flow, integration, and consumption of information throughout society. One of the most practical applications of social epistemology is in the library profession. A librarian aims to be an efficient mediator between man and his access to recorded knowledge. Tools to achieve this goal are classification schemes, subject headings, indexes, and other devices for the subject analysis of bibliographic units.

In 1963–1964 Shera was the president of the Ohio Library Association. From 1964 to 1965 Shera served as president of the Association of American Library Schools (currently the Association for Library and Information Science Education). He was a member of the Information Science and Automation Division of ALA (currently the Library and Information Technology Association), where he served as president from 1971 to 1972.

He wrote and spoke about every type of librarianship from public to special and the history thereof. Of special interest to him was the effect that modern culture has had in the shaping of the modern library and the effect that libraries have had on their host societies in turn.

Shera wrote numerous books and articles and served as the editor of a number of library and information science related journals. Between 1947 and 1952 Shera was an associate editor for Library Quarterly, and from 1952 to 1955 he served as an advisory editor. Shera was also an editor for American Documentation from 1953 to 1959. He was an advisory editor of the Journal of Cataloging and Classification from 1947 to 1957. He also served as editor of the Western Reserve University Press from 1954 to 1957.

Despite his work in advancing information science and the use of information technology in library contexts, throughout his career he was a consistent believer in the importance of sociological and humanistic aspects to librarianship and information organization. Late in his career he came to believe that the "human side" of librarianship and information work in general faced a danger of being overshadowed by attention to technical matters as the information explosion of the 1980s began to take shape.

Over the course of his life, Shera touched every aspect of Library science. He championed technology and stated "that the computer would revolutionize libraries" but urged careful use of it, rather than subservience to it. Shera saw the potential for technology in library science. "He tried to build information retrieval systems yet at the same time was a sober and sharp critic of the faddists, commercial hucksters, and techie boosters who would and often did take us down expensive and obscure roads on our way to the future." At times, his articles almost seem to push entirely in one direction or the other, but taken as a whole he was fairly evenhanded. Proponents on both sides of the technology debate claimed him as their own, but he didn't seem to have any affinity for either extreme camp until at least the mid-seventies. Shera wrote of the progress made over the last century in 1976, in an article he wrote for the Library Journal entitled "Failure and Success: Assessing a Century". This article can be summarized in saying that the new technology is leading librarians to analyze more thoroughly, and makes them ask if that is something that should be done. Shera states that it can be beneficial to librarianship so long as machines and the demands of machines are not allowed to determine the character of and the limitations upon our professional services. This technology is a great opportunity, but it is important to keep Shera's advice in mind to not allow it to define the profession. This theme is repeated over and over across several years: "Embrace the technology but do not become its servant".

He was elected as a Fellow of the American Association for the Advancement of Science shortly before his death on March 8, 1982, aged 78.

Many of his books are actually compilations of essays or presentations, but there are a fair number of text books scattered through his life's work.

JESSE, the primary email discussion list used by library and information science educators, is named in honor of Jesse Shera.

The American Library Association offers two awards in Shera's name: the Jesse H. Shera Award for Distinguished Published Research, and the Jesse H. Shera Award for the Support of Dissertation Research. The first of these awards is given for research articles published in English during the calendar year, nominated by any member of Library Research Round Table (LRRT), by the editors of research journals in the field of library and information studies, or by self-nomination. The second award is given to provide recognition and monetary support for dissertation research and is nominated by Professor of Library and Information Science, or self nomination.

== Awards ==
- Melvil Dewey Medal (1968).American Library Association.
- Award of Merit Association for Information Science and Technology (ASIS&T) (1973).
- Joseph W. Lippincott Award.(1973). American Library Association.
- American Library Association Honorary Membership, 1976.
- Fellow of the American Association for the Advancement of Science (1982).

== Books by Jesse Shera ==
- Introduction to library science: basic elements of library service. Littleton, Colo.: Libraries Unlimited, 1976 ISBN 0-87287-173-8
- Knowing books and men; knowing computers too. Littleton, Colo., Libraries Unlimited, 1973 ISBN 0-87287-073-1
- The foundations of education for librarianship. New York, Becker and Hayes 1972 ISBN 0-471-78520-2
- "The complete librarian"; and other essays. Cleveland, Press of Western Reserve University, 1971, 1979 ISBN 0-8295-0193-2
- Sociological foundations of librarianship. New York, Asia Pub. House 1970 ISBN 0-210-22283-2
- Documentation and the organization of knowledge. Hamden, Conn., Archon Books, 1966
- Libraries and the organization of knowledge. London, C. Lockwood 1965
- An epistemological foundation for library science. Cleveland, Press of Western Reserve University, 1965
- Information resources: a challenge to American science and industry. Cleveland, Press of Western Reserve Univ. 1958
- The classified catalog: basic principles and practices. Chicago, American Library Association, 1956
- Documentation in action / Jesse H. Shera, Allen Kent, James W. Perry [editors]. New York : Reinhold Publishing Corp., 1956.
- Historians, books and libraries: a survey of historical scholarship in relation to library resources, organization and services. Cleveland, Press of Western Reserve University, 1953
- Bibliographic organization. Chicago, University of Chicago Press, 1951
- Foundations of the public library: the origins of the public library movement in New England, 1629–1855. Chicago : University of Chicago Press, 1952, 1949
- An eddy in the western flow of America culture. Ohio state archæological and historical quarterly. --Columbus, O., 1935.
- The age factor in employment, a classified bibliography, by J.H. Shera ... Bulletin of bibliography and dramatic index. --Boston : Boston Book Co., 1931–32.
