= Social Epistemology (journal) =

- Discipline: Science, Technology and Society, Philosophy, Interdisciplinary Social Science
- Language: English
- Edited by: Eric Kerr

Publication details
- History: 1987–present
- Publisher: Taylor & Francis
- Frequency: Bimonthly
- Impact factor: 2.0 (2024)

Standard abbreviations
- ISO 4: Soc. Epistemol.

Indexing
- ISSN: 0269-1728 (print); 1464-5297 (web)
- OCLC no.: 87643561

Links
- Journal homepage; Online access; Online archive

Social Epistemology: A Journal of Knowledge, Culture and Policy is a ranked, bimonthly peer-reviewed academic journal. It was established in 1987 and is published by Taylor & Francis. It provides a forum for philosophical and social scientific enquiry that incorporates the work of scholars from a variety of disciplines who share a concern with the production, assessment and validation of knowledge.

The journal covers both empirical research into the origination and transmission of knowledge and normative considerations which arise as such research is implemented, serving as a guide for directing contemporary knowledge enterprises. It operates in tandem with the Social Epistemology Review and Reply Collective, an open-access forum for intellectual inquiry which publishes critical replies to journal articles, book reviews, and article reviews, and hosts debates exploring knowledge as a social phenomenon.

== Editors-in-chief ==
- (1987–1997) Steve Fuller (University of Warwick) – Founding Editor-in-chief
- (1997–2009) Joan Leach (University of Queensland)
- (2009–2018) James H. Collier (Virginia Tech)
- (2018–2023) Georg Theiner (Villanova University)
- (since 2024) Eric Kerr (National University of Singapore)
