= Markus Gabriel =

German philosopher (born 1980)

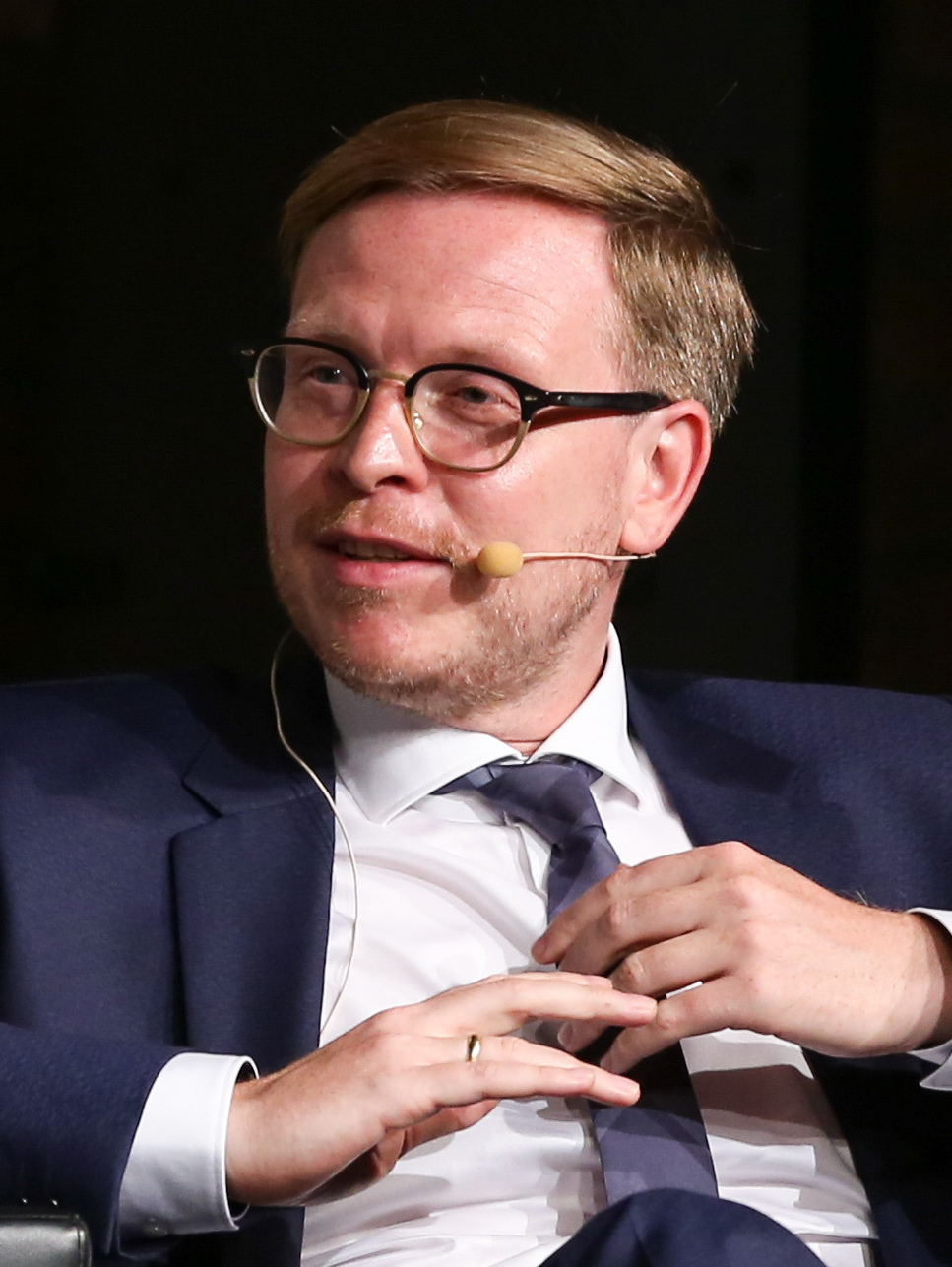
- Gabriel in 2020
- Born: 6 April 1980 (age 46); Remagen, Rhineland-Palatinate, West Germany

Education
- Education: Heidelberg University
- Thesis: German Idealism and Friedrich Wilhelm Joseph von Schelling (2005)
- Doctoral advisors: Jens Halfwassen, Rüdiger Bubner

Philosophical work
- Era: 21st-century philosophy
- Region: Western philosophy
- Institutions: University of Bonn; UC Berkeley; New School for Social Research; Edge.org; Philo Monaco
- Website: markus-gabriel.com

Markus Gabriel (German: [ˈɡaːbʁiˌeːl]; born 6 April 1980) is a German philosopher and author at the University of Bonn. In addition to his more specialized work, he has also written popular books about philosophical issues.

== Career ==
Gabriel was educated in philosophy, Philology, and German studies. After completing his doctorate and habilitation at Heidelberg University, he held a faculty position at New School for Social Research. He then joined the faculty at the University of Bonn, where he holds the chair for Epistemology, Modern and Contemporary Philosophy, and is Director of the International Centre for Philosophy. Gabriel has also been a visiting professor at University of California, Berkeley. From 2022 to 2024, he worked (together with Anna Katsman) as academic director at The New Institute in Hamburg.

== Work ==
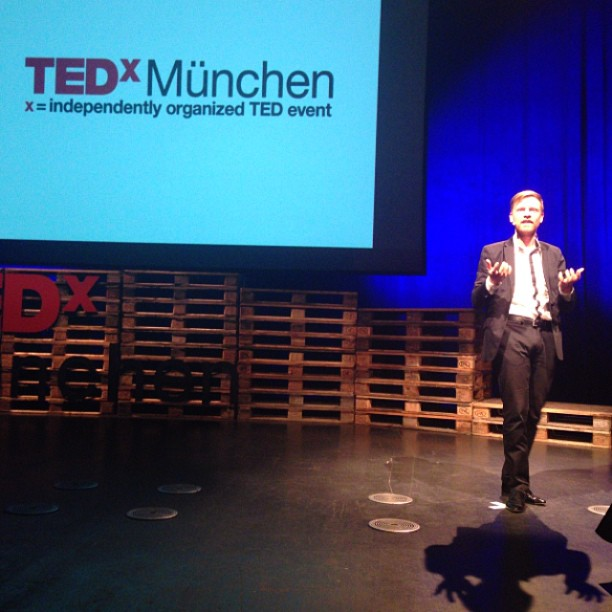
Gabriel in 2013

Gabriel argues against Physicalism, Moral nihilism, and Neurocentrism.

=== Physicalism ===
In 2013, Gabriel wrote Transcendental Ontology: Essays in German Idealism. In the Notre Dame Philosophical Reviews Sebastian Gardner wrote that the work is "Gabriel's most comprehensive presentation to date, in English, of his reading of German Idealism" and notes that "due to its compression of a wealth of ideas into such a short space, the book demands quite a lot from its readers."

In a 2018 interview, Gabriel complained that "most contemporary metaphysicians are [sloppy] when it comes to characterizing their subject matter," using words like "the world" and "reality" "often...interchangeably and without further clarifications. In my view, those totality of words do not refer to anything which is capable of having the property of existence." He goes on to explain:

I try to revive the tradition of metaontology and metametaphysics that departs from Kant. As has been noticed, Heidegger introduced the term metaontology and he also clearly states that Kant’s philosophy is a “metaphysics about metaphysics.” I call metametaphysical nihilism the view that there is no such thing as the world such that questions regarding its ultimate nature, essence, structure, composition, categorical outlines etc. are devoid of the intended conceptual content. The idea that there is a big thing comprising absolutely everything is an illusion, albeit neither a natural one nor an inevitable feature of reason as such. Of course, there is an influential Neo-Carnapian strand in the contemporary debate which comes to similar conclusions. I agree with a lot of what is going on in this area of research and I try to combine it with the metaontological/metametaphysical tradition of Kantian and Post-Kantian philosophy.

== Opinion about COVID-19 ==
In an April 2020 interview he called European measures against COVID-19 unjustified and a step towards cyber dictatorship, saying the use of health apps was a Chinese or North Korean strategy. He said the coronavirus crisis called into question the idea that only scientific and technical progress could lead to human and moral progress. He said there was a paradox of virocracy, to save lives one replaced democracy by virocracy.

== Publications ==
=== Monographs ===
- Gabriel, Markus (2006). Der Mensch im Mythos: Untersuchungen über Ontotheologie, Anthropologie und Selbstbewußtseinsgeschichte in Schellings "Philosophie der Mythologie" [Man in Myth: Studies on Ontotheology, Anthropology, and the History of Self-Consciousness in Schelling's "Philosophy of Mythology".] (in German) (Quellen und Studien zur Philosophie ed.). Berlin/New York City: Walter de Gruyter. p. 513. ISBN 978-3110190366.
- Gabriel, Markus (2008). Antike und moderne Skepsis zur Einführung [Ancient and modern skepticism for introduction] (in German). Hamburg: Junius. p. 183. ISBN 978-3-88506-649-1.
- Gabriel, Markus; Žižek, Slavoj (2009). Mythology, Madness, and Laughter: Subjectivity in German Idealism. New York/London: Continuum. p. 202. ISBN 978-1-4411-9105-2.
- Gabriel, Markus (2014). An den Grenzen der Erkenntnistheorie. Die notwendige Endlichkeit des objektiven Wissens als Lektion des Skeptizismus [At the Limits of Epistemology. The necessary finiteness of objective knowledge as a lesson of skepticism.] (in German) (Quellen und Studien zur Philosophie ed.). Freiburg i.Br./München: Verlag Karl Alber. p. 454. ISBN 978-3495486580.
- Gabriel, Markus (2016). Sinn und Existenz - Eine realistische Ontologie [Meaning and Existence - A Realistic Ontology] (in German). Berlin: Suhrkamp Verlag. p. 507. ISBN 978-3-518-29716-2.
- Gabriel, Markus (2017). Buchheim, Thomas (ed.). Neutraler Realismus (in German) (Jahrbuch-Kontroversen 2 ed.). Verlag Karl Alber.
- Gabriel, Markus (2017). Gaitsch, Peter; Lehmann, Sandra; Schmidt, Philipp (eds.). Eine Diskussion mit Markus Gabriel. Phänomenologische Positionen zum Neuen Realismus [A discussion with Markus Gabriel. Phenomenological Positions on New Realism.] (in German). Wien/Berlin: Turia + Kant. p. 260. ISBN 978-3-85132-858-5.
- Gabriel, Markus (2017). Eckoldt, Matthias (ed.). Der Geist untersteht nicht den Naturgesetzen, sondern seinen eigenen Gesetzen [The spirit is not subject to the laws of nature, but to its own laws.] (in German) (Kann sich das Bewusstsein bewusst sein? ed.). Heidelberg: Carl-Auer Verlag GmbH. p. 247. ISBN 978-3-8497-0202-1.
- Gabriel, Markus; Krüger, Malte (2018). Was ist Wirklichkeit? Neuer Realismus und Hermeneutische Theologie [What is Reality? New Realism and Hermeneutic Theology.] (in German). Tübingen: Mohr Siebeck. p. 124. ISBN 978-3-16-156598-4.
- Gabriel, Markus; Olay, Csaba (2018). Ostritsch, Sebastian (ed.). Welt und Unendlichkeit. Ein deutsch-ungarischer Dialog in memoriam László Tengelyi [World and Infinity. A German-Hungarian Dialogue in Memoriam of László Tengelyi] (in German). Freiburg: Verlag Karl Alber. p. 2014. ISBN 978-3-495-48853-9.
- Gabriel, Markus (2018). Der Sinn des Denkens [The sense of thinking] (in German). Berlin: Ullstein Buchverlage GmbH. p. 366. ISBN 978-3-550-08193-4.
- (en) Neo-Existentialism, Polity, 2018, ISBN 978-15095-3247-6 / ISBN 978-15095-3248-3 (pb)
- (en) The Meaning of Thought, Polity, 2020, ISBN 978-1509538362
- Gabriel, Markus; Eckoldt, Matthias (2019). Die ewige Wahrheit und der Neue Realismus : Gespräche über (fast) alles, was der Fall ist [The eternal truth and the New Realism : conversations about (almost) everything that is the case.] (in German). Heidelberg: Carl-Auer Verlag GmbH. p. 262. ISBN 978-3-8497-0312-7.
- (en) The Power of Art. Polity. 2020. ISBN 978-1509540976.
- Gabriel, Markus (2020). Neo-Existentialismus [Neo-Existentialism] (in German). Freiburg/München: Verlag Karl Alber. p. 171. ISBN 978-3-495-49047-1.
- Gabriel, Markus (2020). Fiktionen [Fictions] (in German). Berlin: Suhrkamp Verlag. p. 636. ISBN 978-3-518-58748-5.
- Gabriel, Markus (2020). Moralischer Fortschritt in dunklen Zeiten : universale Werte für das 21. Jahrhundert [Moral progress in dark times : universal values for the 21st century.] (in German). Berlin: Ullstein Buchverlage GmbH. p. 368. ISBN 978-3-550-08194-1.
- Gabriel, Markus (2020). Redliches Denken: Grundlagen der Ethik aus philosophischer Sicht : ein Essay [Thinking honestly : foundations of ethics from a philosophical point of view : an essay.] (in German). Würzburg: West-Östliche Weisheit Willigis Jäger Stiftung. p. 44. ISBN 978-3-9819150-5-1.
- Gabriel, Markus; Scobel, Gert (2021). Zwischen Gut und Böse: Philosophie der radikalen Mitte [Between Good and Evil: Philosophy of the Radical Center] (in German). Hamburg: Edition Körber. p. 320. ISBN 978-3-89684-287-9.
- (en) With Graham Priest: Everything and Nothing, Polity, 2022, ISBN 978-1-5095-3747-1
- Gabriel, Markus (2024). Sense, Nonsense, and Subjectivity. Cambridge, MA: Harvard University Press. p. 296. ISBN 978-0-6742-6028-3.

=== Popular science ===
- Warum es die Welt nicht gibt, Ullstein Buchverlage GmbH, 2013, ISBN 978-3-548-37568-7
- Ich ist nicht Gehirn: Philosophie des Geistes für das 21. Jahrhundert, Ullstein, 2015, ISBN 978-3-548-37680-6

=== Editions (publisher, co-editor or co-worker) ===
- Halfwassen, Jens; Gabriel, Markus; Zimmermann, Stephan, eds. (2011). Philosophie und Religion [Philosophy and religion] (in German). Conference paper, 2008. Heidelberg: Winter. p. 329. ISBN 978-3-8253-5863-1.
- Gabriel, Markus, ed. (2011). Skeptizismus und Metaphysik [Skepticism and Metaphysics] (in German). Berlin: Akad.-Verl. p. 356. ISBN 978-3-05-005171-0.
- Gabriel, Markus; Heyne, Stefan (2014). Porstmann, Gisbert (ed.). Stefan Heyne - Naked light : die Belichtung des Unendlichen [Stefan Heyne - Naked light : the exposure of the infinite] (in German). on the occasion of the exhibition Stefan Heyne - Naked Light. The Exposure of the Infinite, Städtische Galerie Dresden - Kunstsammlung, June 14 to September 14, 2014. Ostfildern: Hatje Cantz. p. 128. ISBN 978-3-7757-3841-5.
- Gabriel, Markus, ed. (2014). Der Neue Realismus [The New Realism] (in German). Conference paper, 2013. Berlin: Suhrkamp. p. 422. ISBN 978-3-518-29699-8.
- Gabriel, Markus; Egging, Björn; Wurm, Erwin (2015). Beil, Ralf (ed.). Erwin Wurm - Fichte [Erwin Wurm - spruce] (in German). Baden-Baden: Kunstmuseum Wolfsburg. p. 109. ISBN 978-3-945364-04-8.
- Gabriel, Markus; Hogrebe, Wolfram; Speer, Andreas, eds. (2015). Das neue Bedürfnis nach Metaphysik [The new desire for metaphysics] (in German). Berlin, Boston: Walter de Gruyter. p. 292. ISBN 978-3-11-044129-1.
- Freytag, Philip (2019). Gabriel, Markus (ed.). Die Rahmung des Hintergrunds : eine Untersuchung über die Voraussetzungen von Sprachtheorien am Leitfaden der Debatten Derrida – Searle und Derrida – Habermas [Framing the background : an investigation into the presuppositions of theories of language guided by the Derrida – Searle and Derrida – Habermas debates.] (in German). Frankfurt am Main: Vittorio Klostermann. p. 542. ISBN 978-3-465-04358-4.
