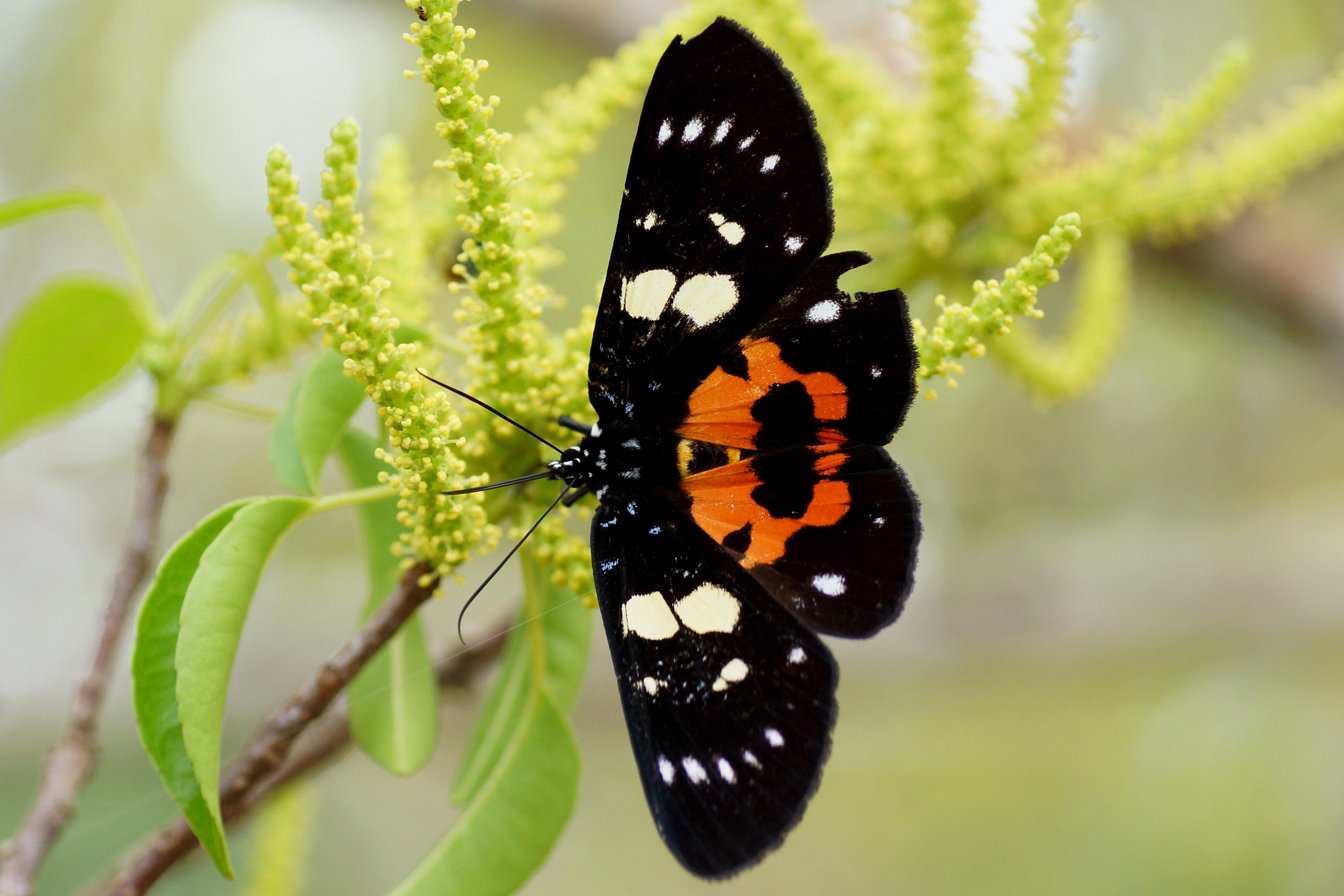
- Episteme adulatrix

Scientific classification
- Kingdom: Animalia
- Phylum: Arthropoda
- Clade: Pancrustacea
- Class: Insecta
- Order: Lepidoptera
- Superfamily: Noctuoidea
- Family: Noctuidae
- Subfamily: Agaristinae
- Genus: Episteme; Hübner, [1820]

Synonyms
- Eusemia Dalman, 1825

= Episteme (moth) =

Genus of moths

Episteme is a genus of moths of the family Noctuidae. The genus was erected by Jacob Hübner in 1820. Species are widespread.

== Description ==
Palpi upturned, where the terminal joint long and naked. Antennae simple and dilated. Forewings with vein 5 from near angle of cell, vein 6 from upper angle, and veins 7 to 10 stalked. Hindwings with vein 5 from the center of discocellulars.

== Species ==
- Episteme adulatrix Kollar, [1844]
- Episteme arctopsa Chou & Chen, 1962
- Episteme beatrix Jordan, 1909
- Episteme bisma Moore, [1858]
- Episteme connexa Walker, 1856
- Episteme conspicua Rothschild, 1896
- Episteme hebe Jordan, 1912
- Episteme latimargo Hampson, 1891
- Episteme lectrix Linnaeus, 1764
- Episteme macrosema Jordan, 1912
- Episteme maculatrix Duncan & Westwood, 1841
- Episteme mundina Jordan, 1912
- Episteme negrita Hampson, 1894
- Episteme nigripennis Butler, 1875
- Episteme nipalensis Butler, 1875
- Episteme sumatrana Rothschild, 1899
- Episteme sumbana Rothschild, 1897
- Episteme vetula Geyer, 1832
