= Edwin Holt =

American professor of philosophy and psychology (1873–1946)

- Born: Edwin Bissell Holt; August 21, 1873; Winchester, Massachusetts, U.S.
- Died: January 25, 1946 (aged 72); Rockland, Maine, U.S.
- Education: Harvard University
- Known for: New realism
- Scientific career
- Fields: Philosophy and psychology
- Institutions: Harvard University; Princeton University
- Thesis: The motor element in vision (1901)
- Doctoral advisor: Hugo Münsterberg
- Other academic advisors: William James; Josiah Royce
- Doctoral students: Harold H. Schlosberg; Edward C. Tolman
- Other notable students: James J. Gibson

Edwin Bissell Holt (/hoʊlt/; August 21, 1873 – January 25, 1946) was an American professor of philosophy and psychology at Harvard from 1901–1918. From 1926–1936, he was a visiting professor of psychology at Princeton University.

== Biography ==
Holt was born in Winchester, Massachusetts. He graduated from Harvard in 1896 and received his Ph.D., also from Harvard, in 1901. His mentors at Harvard were William James, Hugo Münsterberg, and Josiah Royce.

Holt retired from teaching at Harvard in 1918. Kuklick (1977) has suggested that Holt's retirement from Harvard was due to various causes. First, Holt shared William James' concerns and criticisms of academia, and resented the fact that academic life had by his time turned into a quest for personal glory and prestige, rather than an honest quest for knowledge. Second, members of his intellectual group of friends, which included Robert Yerkes, Herbert Langfeld, and Ralph Barton Perry, left Cambridge or withdrew for familial reasons. Heft (2001) has also suggested that Holt's homosexuality might have generated some further conflicts in Cambridge in the early decades of the 20th century. Finally, Kuklick argued that Holt had assumed the care of his aging mother, which decreased his social interactions, and was likely the reason why Holt turned down an academic offer from the University of Manchester. Holt quit Harvard immediately after her death.

His doctoral dissertation was in the area of perception, under the direction of Münsterberg. Around 1910 he started with others the philosophical movement of new realism, as a response to Royce's criticisms of William James' views on realism. After attending Sigmund Freud's famous lecture in Clark University in 1909, Holt was highly impressed with psychoanalysis, which influenced his book The Freudian Wish. His most famous work was published in 1931, Animal Drive and the Learning Process: An Essay Toward Radical Empiricism, which presented his views on learning and development.

Holt's psychology was related to the behaviorism of Watson, but his views about behavior were broader and more philosophically oriented than Watson's, including, for instance, notions such as goals, purposes, and plans, clearly observable in the actions of organisms (See discussions in Charles, 2011). For Holt, then, behavior is purposive and goal-directed, a notion that influenced the theorizing of one of Holt's most famous students, Edward C. Tolman, who later emphasized many of Holt's points through his own work on purposive behavior.

After his retirement, Holt moved to Tenants Harbor, Maine, with his long-time male companion, George X. Bernier. Holt came out of retirement and taught at Princeton for a decade between 1926 and 1936, before returning to Maine. Holt died in Rockland, Maine in 1946 and is buried in Winchester, Massachusetts.

== Bibliography ==
- "The Place of Illusory Experience in a Realistic World." in The New Realism. New York: Macmillan (1912).
- The Concept of Consciousness. New York: Macmillan (1914)
- The Freudian Wish and Its Place in Ethics. New York: Holt (1915)
- Animal Drive and the Learning Process. New York: Holt (1931).
