= C. A. J. Coady =

Australian philosopher

Cecil Anthony John Coady FAHA FASSA, more commonly publishing as C. A. J. Coady and less formally known as Tony Coady (born 18 April 1936), is a prominent Australian philosopher, working particularly in epistemology but also in political and applied philosophy. Coady's best-known work relates to the epistemological problems posed by testimony, as expounded in his book Testimony: a Philosophical Study (Oxford University Press, 1990). It was influential in establishing a new branch of inquiry within the field of epistemology. He is also well known for his publications on issues related to political violence. Coady is a regular commentator in the Australian media on philosophical aspects of public affairs.

== Education ==
Coady first studied philosophy at the University of Sydney as a part-time evening student while working full-time as a journalist. After gaining his B.A in 1962, he secured a scholarship to the University of Melbourne, leaving professional journalism behind, and was awarded Master of Arts with First Class Honours in Philosophy in 1963. Also in 1963 he received the Daniel Mannix Scholarship to travel to Oxford University where he gained the B. Phil. in philosophy (second place in the year) in 1965. In 1973, he was awarded a Master of Arts by the University of Cambridge.

== Academic career ==
Coady’s first full-time academic appointment was as lecturer in philosophy at Corpus Christi College, Oxford in 1965-66. At the end of this appointment, he declined an offer of a lectureship at Birkbeck College, University of London in 1966 to take up a Lectureship in philosophy at the University of Melbourne. He was appointed reader in philosophy at Melbourne University in 1977 and Boyce Gibson Professor there from 1990 to 1998, after which he served at Melbourne as Australian Research Council Senior Research Fellow and professorial fellow. He is now professor emeritus in philosophy at the University of Melbourne and also honorary fellow in the Institute of Philosophy at the Australian Catholic University.

In 1990 he was founding director (with Charles Sampford as Deputy) of the University of Melbourne’s PhilosophyCentre for Philosophy and Public Issues (CPPI), the first Centre in Australia to be concerned with broad issues of philosophy and public affairs. (The Centre for Human Bio-ethics at Monash University established earlier had had a somewhat similar orientation but a narrower focus.) The CPPI was later incorporated into the ARC Special Research Centre for Applied Philosophy and Public Ethics (CAPPE) established in 2000 with Coady as deputy director of CAPPE and director of the University of Melbourne division. He has held visiting positions at many universities and research institutions world-wide, including colleges in Oxford and Cambridge, The University Center for Human Values at Princeton University, The Institute for Peace in Washington, D.C., and The Rockefeller Centre in Bellagio, Italy.

== Honours ==
- Elected Fellow of the Australian Academy of the Humanities (1994)
- Awarded Centenary of Federation Medal (2001)
- Elected Fellow of the Australian Academy of Social Sciences (2001)
- Uehiro Lectures in Practical Ethics, Oxford University (2005)
- Leverhulme Lectures, Oxford University (2012)
- Awarded the T. G. Tucker Medal for outstanding achievements, excellence in scholarship, and academic contribution to the University of Melbourne and its Arts Faculty in 2015.

== Selected publications ==
=== Books ===
- Testimony: A Philosophical Study, Oxford University Press, New York, (1992).
- Morality and Political Violence, Cambridge University Press, New York, (2007).
- Messy Morality: The Challenge of Politics, Oxford University Press, New York, (2009).
- The Meaning of Terrorism, Oxford University Press, New York, (2021).

=== Edited collections ===
- Why Universities Matter: A Conversation about Values, Means and Directions, Allen and Unwin, Melbourne, (2000).
- The Ethics of Human Enhancement: Understanding the Debate, (co-edited with S. Clarke, A. Giublini, S. Sanyal, and J. Savulescu), Oxford University Press, Oxford, (2016).
- Challenges for Humanitarian Intervention: Ethical Demand & Political Reality (co-edited with Ned Dobos and Sagar Sanyal), Oxford University Press, Oxford, (2018).
