= Walter Taylor Marvin =

- Born: April 28, 1872; New York City, New York, U.S.
- Died: May 26, 1944 (aged 72); Trenton, New Jersey, U.S.
- Occupation: Philosopher

Walter Taylor Marvin (April 28, 1872 – May 26, 1944) was an American philosopher at Rutgers. He was a new realist.
