= Sebastian Gardner =

British philosopher

- Born: Sebastian Angus Gardner; 19 March 1960 (age 66)
- Awards: Leverhulme Research Fellowship

Education
- Education: University of Cambridge (PhD)
- Thesis: Sartre's critique of Freud: irrationality and the philosophy of psychoanalysis (1987)

Philosophical work
- Era: 21st-century philosophy
- Region: Western philosophy
- School: German idealism
- Institutions: University College London
- Main interests: Kant, nineteenth-century German philosophy, psychoanalysis, Sartre, aesthetics
- Website: http://www.ucl.ac.uk/~uctyseg/

Sebastian Angus Gardner (born 19 March 1960) is a British philosopher and Professor of Philosophy at University College London. He is known for his expertise on Kant, German idealism, Sartre and Freud, and for his philosophical interpretations and investigations in the subject of psychoanalytic theory.

== Education and career ==
Gardner earned his B.A. in 1982 and his Ph.D. in 1987, both from the University of Cambridge. His doctoral thesis, later revised into a book publication, dealt with Sartre's critique of Freud. He taught first at Birkbeck College, London and then, from 1998, at UCL. He has written extensively on Freud and psychoanalysis, on Kant, and on post-Kantian philosophy, including Fichte, Schelling, Hegel and Nietzsche.

His 1993 book Irrationality and the Philosophy of Psychoanalysis attempted to justify a view of the psychoanalytic subject and the unconscious which nevertheless maintained fidelity to Sartre's critique of the Freudian unconscious and the censorship mechanism. Gardner argues for the failure of sub-systemic theories of the mind (such as those of cognitive psychology) to provide a framework for actively irreconcilable or self-contradicting actions, utterances, or impulses, which can be conceptualised as internal to the subject. He therefore distinguishes between the propositional structure of consciousness which is distorted by the 'pre-propositional' forms of the unconscious. In this sense the unconscious does not directly 'compete' with conscious structures, but is rather irreducible to the modes in which conscious discourse is articulated. Kleinian phantasy, as a pre-linguistic composition of part-objects and drives, is presented as a potential way of understanding such a pre-propositional unconscious.

Gardner has written multiple essays on authors including Freud, Nietzsche, Derrida, Habermas, Lacan, and has more recently published books on Kant's Critique of Pure Reason and Sartre's Being and Nothingness.

== Books ==
- Irrationality and the Philosophy of Psychoanalysis, Cambridge University Press, 1993
- Kant and the Critique of Pure Reason, Routledge, 1999
- Sartre's Being and Nothingness, Continuum, 2009

=== Edited ===
- Art and Morality, edited with Jose Luis Bermudez, Routledge, 2003
- The Transcendental Turn, edited with Matthew Grist, Oxford University Press, 2015
