= Episteme (journal) =

- Discipline: Philosophy
- Language: English
- Edited by: Jennifer Lackey

Publication details
- History: 2004–present
- Publisher: Cambridge University Press
- Frequency: Quarterly

Standard abbreviations
- ISO 4: Episteme
- NLM: Episteme (Edinb)

Indexing
- ISSN: 1742-3600 (print); 1750-0117 (web)
- OCLC no.: 613026070

Links
- Journal homepage; Online access; Online archive; Online access at Project MUSE

Episteme: A Journal of Individual and Social Epistemology is a quarterly peer-reviewed academic journal covering epistemology. It was established in 2004 and is published by Cambridge University Press. The editor-in-chief is Jennifer Lackey (Northwestern University); the founding editors were Leslie Marsh (University of British Columbia) and Chris Onof (Imperial College London).

== Abstracting and indexing ==
The journal is abstracted and indexed in the Arts and Humanities Citation Index, EBSCO databases, Modern Language Association Database, Philosopher's Index, and Scopus.
