= Edward Gleason Spaulding =

Edward Gleason Spaulding (6 August 1873 – 31 January 1940) was an American philosopher, born in Burlington, Vermont. He was a professor of philosophy at Princeton University. He is a proponent of New Realism and co-wrote The New Realism (1912). He died in Princeton, New Jersey.

== Works ==
- The New Rationalism. The development of a constructive realism upon the basis of modern logic and science, and through criticism of opposed systems. New York: Henry Holt, 1918.
- A World of Chance. New York: Macmillan, 1936.
