= Alfred Henry Lloyd =

American philosopher (1864–1927)

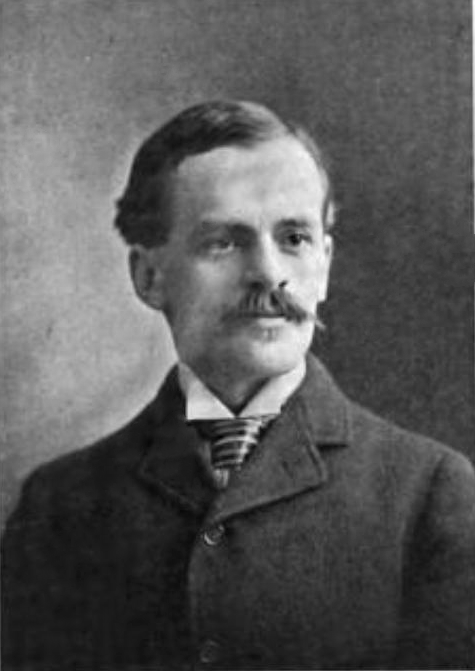

Interim President of the University of Michigan
- In office 1925–1925
- Preceded by: Marion LeRoy Burton
- Succeeded by: Clarence Cook Little

Personal details
- Born: January 6, 1864 Montclair, New Jersey
- Died: May 11, 1927 (aged 63) Ann Arbor, Michigan

Alfred Henry Lloyd (January 3, 1864 – May 11, 1927) was an American philosopher.

== Life ==
Lloyd received both his B.A. and M.A. degrees from Harvard. He studied philosophy at Göttingen University and Heidelberg University, before returning to Harvard for his Ph.D., which he received in 1893. Upon returning from Europe in 1891, Lloyd was recruited by John Dewey as an instructor in philosophy at the University of Michigan. He remained there his entire career, becoming full professor in 1906. He was named dean of the graduate school in 1915.

Lloyd was interim president of the University of Michigan from February 26 through September 1925, following the death of Marion LeRoy Burton. He died in Ann Arbor, Michigan, on May 11, 1927.

He was succeeded by Clarence Cook Little. Lloyd's daughter, Alice Crocker Lloyd, served as the dean of women.

== Works ==
Lloyd was the author of five books—Citizenship and Salvation (1897), Dynamic Idealism (1898), Philosophy of History (1899), The Will to Doubt (1907), and Leadership and Progress (1922)—and over 70 articles.

=== The Will to Doubt ===
The Will to Doubt was Lloyd's fourth book and was published as a volume in the Ethical Library Series. The book was a response to William James' 1896 collection of essays titled The Will to Believe. Professor Lloyd's simple thesis is that "doubt is essential to real belief". He wrote at the beginning of the 20th century, in what he called an age of doubt:

We would often hide it from others, not to say from ourselves, but it is there, and we all know it to be there. Though many fear doubt, and try to keep it hidden and locked away, the confession of doubt is in fact the beginning of philosophy.

Fear is a chief motivator of dogmatism, and dogmatic people are slaves to their fears. This is not genuine confidence. But doubt is not the road to atheism; in fact, doubt is part of a very difficult road to theism.

Bertrand Russell built upon these arguments in subsequent years, even directly referencing Lloyd in Free Thought and Official Propaganda.

== See also ==
- American philosophy
- List of American philosophers

Academic offices
| Preceded by Marion LeRoy Burton | President of the University of Michigan; 1925–1925 | Succeeded by Clarence Cook Little |
