= Ere =

Ere or ERE may refer to:

- Energy Regulatory Authority (Albania), organization of Albania
- Environmental and Resource Economics, a peer-reviewed academic journal
- ERE Informatique, one of the first French video game companies
- Ere language, an Austronesian language
- Ebi Ere (born 1981), American-Nigerian professional basketball player
- Ere, Tournai, a village in the Belgian province of Hainaut
- Essays in Radical Empiricism, a William James collection edited and published posthumously
- Extended regular expressions, a set of compliance in the IEEE POSIX regular expression standard
- Ere Gowda, Kannada film director
- National Radical Union (Greek: Ἐθνικὴ Ῥιζοσπαστικὴ Ἕνωσις, romanized: Ethnikī́ Rizospastikī́ Énōsis), a Greek political party
- Eastern Roman Empire, a common term for the Byzantine Empire
- "Ere" (song), 2023 song by Juan Karlos
