= Alice Lloyd =

Alice Lloyd may refer to:

- Alice Lloyd (actress) (1873-1949), British music hall/vaudeville/actress
- Alice Spencer Geddes Lloyd, American social reformer noted for her work in the Appalachia region, best known as the founder of:
- Alice Lloyd College, a liberal arts college in Pippa Passes, Kentucky, a small Appalachian community
- Alice Crocker Lloyd, dean of women at the University of Michigan (1930–1950)
