= William James =

American philosopher and psychologist (1842–1910)

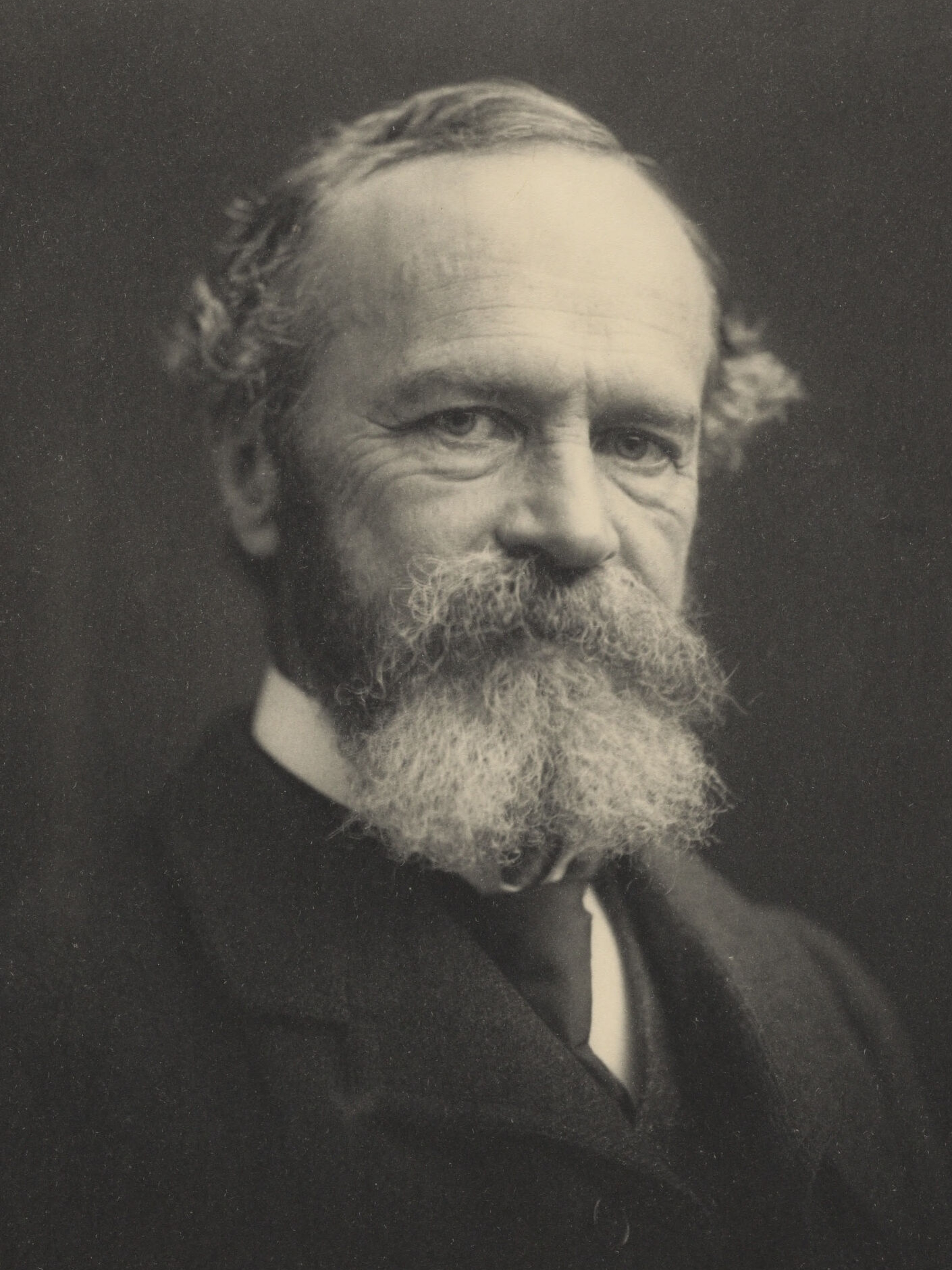
- James in 1903
- Born: January 11, 1842; New York City, U.S.
- Died: August 26, 1910 (aged 68); Chocorua, New Hampshire, U.S.
- Relatives: Henry James Sr. (father); Henry James (brother); Alice James (sister)

Education
- Education: Harvard University
- Academic advisor: Louis Agassiz

Philosophical work
- Era: 19th-/20th-century philosophy
- Region: Western philosophy
- School: Pragmatism; functional psychology; radical empiricism
- Institutions: Harvard University
- Notable students: Mary Whiton Calkins; Morris Raphael Cohen; W. E. B. Du Bois; G. Stanley Hall; Learned Hand; William Ernest Hocking; Edwin Holt; Horace Kallen; C. I. Lewis; Walter Lippmann; Alain Locke; Ralph Barton Perry; Theodore Roosevelt; George Santayana; Boris Sidis; Edgar A. Singer Jr.; Edwin Diller Starbuck; Gertrude Stein
- Main interests: Pragmatism; psychology; philosophy of religion; epistemology; semantics
- Notable ideas: Will to believe doctrine; crisis of self-surrender; pragmatic theory of truth; radical empiricism; James–Lange theory of emotion; psychologist's fallacy; brain usage theory; dilemma of determinism (the distinction between hard determinism and soft determinism); stream of consciousness; James's theory of the self; the term multiverse

William James (January 11, 1842 – August 26, 1910) was an American philosopher and psychologist. The first educator to offer a psychology course in the United States, he is considered to be one of the leading thinkers of the late 19th century, one of the most influential philosophers and is often dubbed the "father of American psychology".

Born into a wealthy family, James was the son of the Swedenborgian theologian Henry James Sr. and the brother of both the prominent novelist Henry James and the diarist Alice James. James trained as a physician and taught anatomy at Harvard, but never practiced medicine. Instead, he pursued his interests in psychology and then philosophy. James wrote widely on many topics, including epistemology, education, metaphysics, psychology, religion, and mysticism. Among his most influential books are The Principles of Psychology, a groundbreaking text in the field of psychology; Essays in Radical Empiricism, an important text in philosophy; and The Varieties of Religious Experience, an investigation of different forms of religious experience, including theories on mind-cure.

Along with Charles Sanders Peirce, James established the philosophical school known as pragmatism, and is also cited as one of the founders of functional psychology. James also developed the philosophical perspective known as radical empiricism. A Review of General Psychology analysis, published in 2002, ranked James as the 14th most eminent psychologist of the 20th century. A survey published in American Psychologist in 1991 ranked James's reputation in second place, after Wilhelm Wundt, who is widely regarded as the founder of experimental psychology. James's work has influenced philosophers and academics such as Hilary Putnam, Richard Rorty, Edmund Husserl, Bertrand Russell, John Dewey, and Ludwig Wittgenstein.

== Early life and education ==
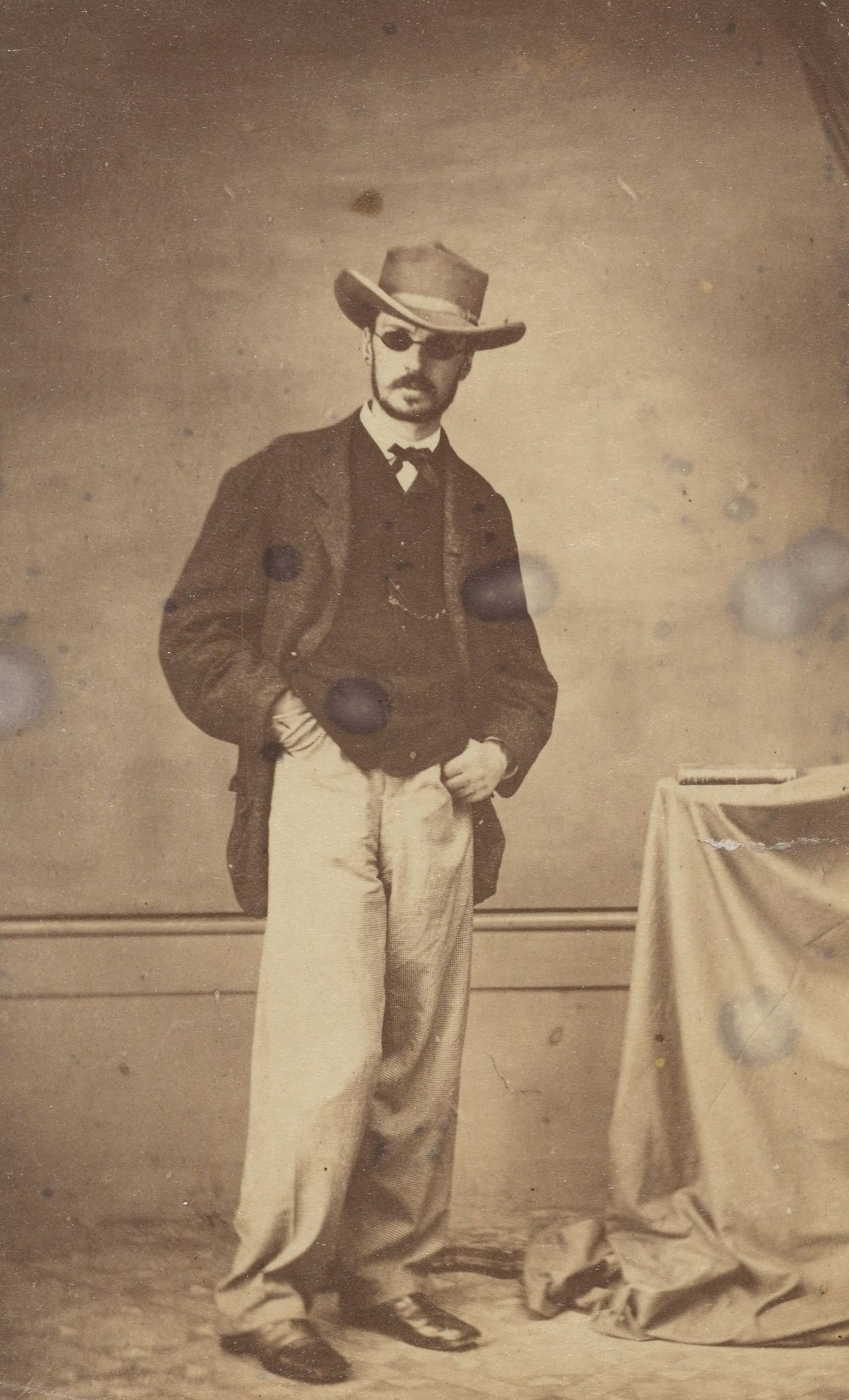
William James in Brazil, 1865

William James was born at the Astor House in New York City on January 11, 1842. He was the son of Henry James Sr., an independently wealthy Swedenborgian theologian well-acquainted with the literary and intellectual elites of his day, and Mary Robertson Walsh. He had four siblings: Henry (the novelist), Garth Wilkinson, Robertson, and Alice (diarist).

James received an eclectic and transatlantic education, where he developed fluency in both German and French. The family made two trips to Europe while James was still a child, setting a pattern that resulted in thirteen more European journeys during his life. His education encouraged cosmopolitanism.

Initially, James wished to pursue painting, which led him to pursue an apprenticeship in the studio of William Morris Hunt in Newport, Rhode Island. However, his father urged him to become a physician instead. In response, James said that he wanted to specialize in physiology. However, once he figured this was also not what he wanted to do, he announced he was going to specialize in the nervous system and psychology. In 1861, James then switched to scientific studies at the Lawrence Scientific School of Harvard College.

In his early adulthood, James suffered from a variety of physical ailments, including those of the eyes, back, stomach, and skin. He was also tone deaf. His various symptoms were diagnosed at the time as neurasthenia, and included periods of depression during which he contemplated suicide for months on end.

Howard Feinstein, in Becoming William James (1984), wrote that William and his sister Alice had a close relationship that has been argued to consist of eroticism. He wrote her sonnets, declaring love, and made several paintings of her.

James' two younger brothers, Garth Wilkinson (Wilkie) and Robertson (Bob), fought in the American Civil War. James himself was an advocate of peace, suggesting that instead of youth serving in the military, they should serve the public in a term of service "to get the childishness knocked out of them".

In 1864, James took up medical studies at Harvard Medical School. In the spring of 1865, he took a break to join naturalist Louis Agassiz on a scientific expedition up the Amazon River, but aborted his trip after eight months, as he suffered bouts of severe seasickness and mild smallpox. His studies were interrupted once again due to illness in April 1867. Aged 26, James traveled to Germany in search of a cure and remained there until November 1868. His time there proved intellectually fertile, helping him find that his true interests lay not in medicine but in philosophy and psychology. Later, in 1902 he would write: "I originally studied medicine in order to be a physiologist, but I drifted into psychology and philosophy from a sort of fatality. I never had any philosophic instruction, the first lecture on psychology I ever heard being the first I ever gave". During this period, he began to publish; reviews of his works appeared in literary periodicals such as the North American Review. What he called his "soul-sickness" would only be resolved in 1872, after an extended period of philosophical searching. In June 1869, James finally earned his MD degree, but he never practiced medicine.

== Career ==
James interacted with a wide array of writers and scholars throughout his life, including his godfather Ralph Waldo Emerson, his godson William James Sidis, Charles Sanders Peirce, Bertrand Russell, Josiah Royce, Ernst Mach, John Dewey, Macedonio Fernández, Walter Lippmann, Mark Twain, Horatio Alger, G. Stanley Hall, Henri Bergson, Carl Jung, Jane Addams, and Sigmund Freud.

=== Harvard years ===
James spent almost all of his academic career at Harvard. He was appointed instructor in Physiology for the spring 1873 term, instructor in Anatomy and Physiology in 1873, Assistant Professor of Psychology in 1876, Assistant Professor of Philosophy in 1881, full professor in 1885, Endowed Chair in Psychology in 1889, Return to Philosophy in 1897, and Emeritus Professor of Philosophy in 1907.

Whilst James had studied medicine, physiology, and biology, and taught in those subjects, he was drawn to the scientific study of the human mind at a time when psychology was constituting itself as a science. He began to introduce courses in scientific psychology at Harvard, informed by the work of figures like Hermann Helmholtz and Pierre Janet. He taught his first experimental psychology course at Harvard in the 1875–1876 academic year.

James was one of the strongest proponents of the school of functionalism in psychology and of pragmatism in philosophy. He was a founder of the American Society for Psychical Research, as well as a champion of alternative approaches to healing.

During his Harvard years, James joined in philosophical discussions and debates with Charles Peirce, Oliver Wendell Holmes, and Chauncey Wright that evolved into a lively group informally known as The Metaphysical Club in 1872. Louis Menand (2001) suggested that this Club provided a foundation for American intellectual thought for decades to come.

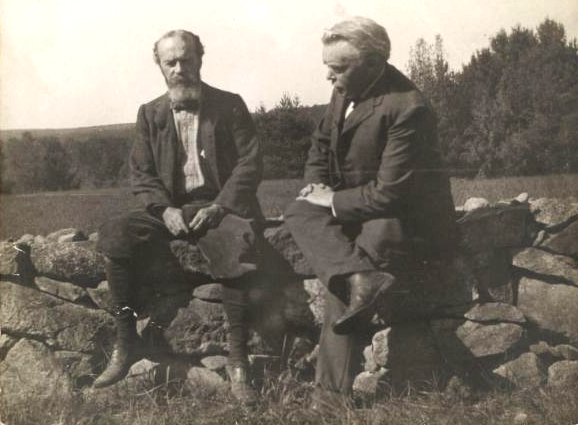
William James and Josiah Royce, near James's country home in Chocorua, New Hampshire in September 1903. James's daughter Peggy took the picture. On hearing the camera click, James cried out: "Royce, you're being photographed! Look out! I say Damn the Absolute!"

Among James's students at Harvard University were Boris Sidis, Theodore Roosevelt, George Santayana, W. E. B. Du Bois, G. Stanley Hall, Ralph Barton Perry, Gertrude Stein, Horace Kallen, Morris Raphael Cohen, Walter Lippmann, Alain Locke, C. I. Lewis, and Mary Whiton Calkins. Antiquarian bookseller Gabriel Wells tutored under him at Harvard in the late 1890s. His students enjoyed his brilliance and his manner of teaching was free of personal arrogance. They remembered him for his kindness and humble attitude.

In 1882, James joined the Theosophical Society.

In 1884 and 1885, James became president of the British Society for Psychical Research for which he wrote in Mind and in the Psychological Review.

In 1898, James joined the Anti-Imperialist League, in opposition to the United States annexation of the Philippines.

=== Writing ===
William James wrote voluminously throughout his life. A non-exhaustive bibliography of his writings, compiled by John McDermott, is 47 pages long.

He gained widespread recognition with his monumental The Principles of Psychology (1890), which totaled twelve hundred pages in two volumes and took twelve years to complete. Psychology: The Briefer Course, was an 1892 abridgement designed as a less rigorous introduction to the field. These works criticized both the English associationist school and the Hegelianism of his day as competing dogmatisms of little explanatory value, and sought to re-conceive the human mind as inherently purposive and selective.

In simple terms, his philosophy and writings can be understood as an emphasis on "fruits over roots", a reflection of his pragmatist tendency to focus on the practical consequences of ideas rather than become mired in unproductive metaphysical arguments or fruitless attempts to ground truth in abstract ways. An empiricist, James believed that we are better off evaluating the fruitfulness of ideas by testing them in the common ground of lived experience.

== Later life and death ==
Following his January 1907 retirement from Harvard, James continued to write and lecture, publishing Pragmatism, A Pluralistic Universe, and The Meaning of Truth.

James was increasingly afflicted with cardiac pain during his last years. It worsened in 1909 while he worked on a philosophy text (unfinished but posthumously published as Some Problems in Philosophy).

In the spring of 1910, James sailed to Europe to take experimental treatments for his heart ailment that proved unsuccessful, and returned home on August 18. His heart failed on August 26, 1910, at his home in Chocorua, New Hampshire. He was buried in the family plot in Cambridge Cemetery, Cambridge, Massachusetts.

== Philosophy ==
=== Epistemology ===
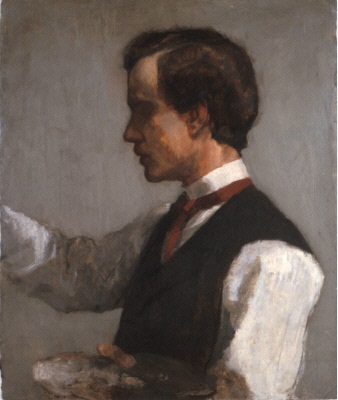
Portrait of William James by John La Farge, c. 1859

==== Pragmatism ====
Pragmatism is a philosophical approach that seeks to both define truth and resolve metaphysical issues. James created a pragmatic theory of truth, which was a synthesis of correspondence theory of truth and coherence theory of truth, with an added dimension. His book of lectures on pragmatism is arguably the most influential book of American philosophy.

James demonstrates an application of his method in the form of a simple story:

A live squirrel supposed to be clinging on one side of a tree-trunk; while over against the tree's opposite side a human being was imagined to stand. This human witness tries to get sight of the squirrel by moving rapidly round the tree, but no matter how fast he goes, the squirrel moves as fast in the opposite direction, and always keeps the tree between himself and the man, so that never a glimpse of him is caught. The resultant metaphysical problem now is this: Does the man go round the squirrel or not?

James solves the issue by making a distinction between the practical meanings of 'round'. On the one hand, 'round' can mean that the man occupies the space north, east, south, and west of the squirrel; and on the other 'round' can mean that the man occupies the space facing the squirrel's belly, back and sides. Depending on what the one means by 'going round', the answer would be clear. From this example James derives the definition of the pragmatic method: to settle metaphysical disputes, one must simply make a distinction of practical consequences between notions, then, the answer is either clear, or the "dispute is idle".

==== "Cash value" ====
In Pragmatism (1907), James introduced the metaphor "cash value" to describe the practical consequences of accepting an idea as true. He writes, "You must bring out of each word its practical cash-value, set it at work within the stream of your experience." An idea's cash value lies in the practical difference it makes in experience. James argued that a belief becomes true if it proves itself useful, reliable, and workable in lived experience. Truth is confirmed over time through its continued verification in experience. "The truth of an idea is not a stagnant property inherent in it. Truth HAPPENS to an idea. It BECOMES true, is MADE true by events. Its verity is in fact an event, a process: the process namely of its verifying itself, its veri-FICATION. Its validity is the process of its valid-ATION." In the Meaning of Truth (1909), James wrote "true ideas are those that we can assimilate, validate, corroborate, and verify. False ideas are those that we cannot."

==== Truth, fact and verifiability ====
In "What Pragmatism Means" (1906), James describes the relationship between truth and fact:

Truths emerge from facts, but they dip forward into facts again and add to them; which facts again create or reveal new truth (the word is indifferent) and so on indefinitely. The "facts" themselves meanwhile are not true. They simply are. Truth is the function of the beliefs that start and terminate among them.

In James' sixth lecture on pragmatics, he begins by defining truth as "agreement with reality". This is multilayered: truth is both verifiable to the extent that thoughts and statements correspond with actual things and to the extent to which they "hang together", or cohere (as pieces of a puzzle might fit together); these, in turn, are verified by the observed results of the application of an idea to actual practice. In other words, a statement's truthfulness is verifiable through its correspondence with reality and its observable effects of putting the idea to practice. As such, a true idea or belief is one that we can blend with our thinking so that it can be justified through experiences. James gives the example of God:

If theological ideas prove to have a value for concrete life, they will be true, for pragmatism, in the sense of being good for so much. For how much more they are true, will depend entirely on their relations to the other truths that also have to be acknowledged.

In other words: "The problem is to build it [theology] out and determine it so that it will combine satisfactorily with all the other working truths." From this, we also know that "new" truths must also correspond to already existent truths.

In regards to beliefs, Kuklick describes that, for James, "A belief was not a mental entity which somehow mysteriously corresponded to an external reality if the belief were true. Beliefs were ways of acting with reference to a precarious environment, and to say they were true was to say they were efficacious in this environment." So, for James, knowledge is justified, and productive, true belief. Belief in anything involves conceiving of how it is real, but disbelief is the result when we dismiss something because it contradicts another thing we think of as real.

James argues that this position results in an application of "radical empiricism". Unrelated to the everyday scientific empiricism, radical empiricism asserts that the world and experience can never be subject to an entirely objective analysis as the mind of the observer and the act of observation affect any empirical approach to truth. As such, he argued that there is no such thing as objective truth.

Whereby the agreement of truths with "reality" results in useful outcomes, "the 'reality' with which truths must agree has three dimensions":

1. "matters of fact";
2. "relations of ideas"; and
3. "the entire set of other truths to which we are committed".

James names four "postulates of rationality" as valuable but unknowable: God, immortality, freedom, and moral duty.

==== Will to believe doctrine ====
In his 1896 lecture titled "The Will to Believe", James defends the right to violate the principle of evidentialism in order to justify hypothesis venturing. This idea foresaw 20th century objections to evidentialism and sought to ground justified belief in an unwavering principle that would prove more beneficial. Through his pragmatism, James justifies religious beliefs by using the results of his hypothetical venturing as evidence to support the hypothesis's truth. Therefore, this doctrine allows one to assume belief in a god and prove its existence by what the belief brings to one's life.

This position was criticized by advocates of skepticism rationality, like Bertrand Russell in Free Thought and Official Propaganda and Alfred Henry Lloyd with The Will to Doubt. Both argued that one must always adhere to fallibilism, recognising of all human knowledge that "None of our beliefs are quite true; all have at least a penumbra of vagueness and error", and that the only means of progressing ever-closer to the truth is to never assume certainty, but always examine all sides and try to reach a conclusion objectively.

==== Discussion and legacy ====
Richard Rorty made the contested claim that James did not mean to give a theory of truth with this statement and that we should not regard it as such. However, other pragmatism scholars such as Susan Haack and Howard Mounce do not share Rorty's instrumentalist interpretation of James.

In The Meaning of Truth (1909), in response to critics of pragmatism, James seems to speak of truth in relativistic terms: "The critic's trouble...seems to come from his taking the word 'true' irrelatively, whereas the pragmatist always means 'true for him who experiences the workings.'" However, James rejected his critics who accused him of relativism, skepticism, or agnosticism, and of believing only in relative truths, and supported an epistemological realism position. (Note: See his Defense of a Pragmatic Notion of Truth, written to counter criticisms of his Pragmatism's Conception of Truth (1907) lecture.)

A criticism of pragmatism is that the best justification for a claim is whether it works. On the other hand, a claim that does not have outcomes cannot be justified, or unjustified, because it will not make a difference. As James states: "There can be no difference that doesn't make a difference."

James stated that pragmatism's goal is ultimately "to try to interpret each notion by tracing its respective practical consequences", but he did not clarify what he means by "practical consequences". Whether James means the greatest number of positive consequences (in light of utilitarianism), a consequence that considers other perspectives (such as his compromise of the tender and tough ways of thinking), or a completely different take altogether, it is unclear what consequences truly fit the pragmatic standard. The closest James comes to explaining this idea is by telling his audience to weigh the difference it would "practically make to anyone" if one opinion over the other were true, and although he attempts to clarify this, he never specifies the method by which one would weigh the difference between one opinion over the other. Thus, the flaw in his argument appears in that it is difficult to fathom how he would determine these practical consequences, which he continually refers to throughout his work, to be measured or interpreted. He has said that an opinion is correct that works for us humans in practice.

However, Peirce made more of an effort to define these consequences. For him, "the consequences we are concerned with are general and intelligible." He further explains this in his 1878 paper "How to Make Ideas Clear," by introducing a maxim that allows one to interpret consequences as grades of clarity and conception. Describing how everything is derived from perception, Peirce uses the example of the doctrine of transubstantiation to show exactly how he defines practical consequences. Protestants interpret the bread and wine of the Eucharist is flesh and blood in only a subjective sense, while Catholics would label them as actual, and divinely mystical properties of flesh via the "body, blood, soul, and divinity", even with the physical properties remaining as bread and wine in appearance. But to everyone, there can be no knowledge of the wine and bread of the Eucharist unless it is established that either wine and bread possesses certain properties or that anything that is interpreted as the blood and body of Christ is the blood and body of Christ. With this Peirce declares that "our action has exclusive reference to what affects the senses", and that we can mean nothing by transubstantiation than "what has certain effects, direct or indirect, upon our senses". In this sense, James's pragmatic influencer Peirce establishes that what counts as a practical consequence or effect is what can affect one's senses and what is comprehensible and fathomable in the natural world.

James's emphasis on diversity as the default human condition—over and against duality, especially Hegelian dialectical duality—has maintained a strong influence in American culture. James's description of the mind-world connection, which he described in terms of a "stream of consciousness", had a direct and significant impact on avant-garde and modernist literature and art, notably in the case of James Joyce.

=== Free will ===
James was prompted to believe his will was free by reading Charles Renouvier, whose work convinced James to convert from monism to pluralism. In his diary entry of April 30, 1870, James wrote:

I think that yesterday was a crisis in my life. I finished the first part of Renouvier's second Essais and see no reason why his definition of free will—"the sustaining of a thought because I choose to when I might have other thoughts"—need be the definition of an illusion. At any rate, I will assume for the present—until next year—that it is no illusion. My first act of free will shall be to believe in free will.

James developed a two-stage model of free will to explain how people make decisions. James distinguishes between chance, " the in-deterministic free element" we have no control over, and choice, "an arguably determinate decision that follows causally from one's character, values, and especially feelings and desires at the moment of decision".

James argues that the question of free will revolves around chance, the idea that some events are possibilities, things that could happen but are not guaranteed. 'Chance' is a neutral term (it is neither inherently positive nor "intrinsically irrational and preposterous"); the only information it gives about the events to which it applies is that they are disconnected from other things – they are "not controlled, secured, or necessitated by other things" before they happen. Chance in regards to our actions is possible because our amount of effort is subject to change. If the amount of effort we put into something is predetermined, our actions would be predetermined. Free will in relation to effort also balances "ideals and propensities—the things you see as best versus the things that are easiest to do". Without effort, "the propensity is stronger than the ideal". To act according to your ideals, you must resist the things that are easiest, and this can only be done with effort. James states that the free will question is therefore simple: "it relates solely to the amount of effort of attention or consent which we can at any time put forth".

James states that in the sequence of the model, chance comes before choice. In the moment of decision we are given the chance to make a decision and then the choice is what we do (or do not do) regarding the decision. James states that we make a choice based on different experiences. It comes from our own past experiences, the observations of others, or a "supply of ideas of the various movements that are... left in the memory by experiences of their involuntary performance is thus the first prerequisite of the voluntary life." In other words, once you've made a decision in the past, the experience is stockpiled into your memory where it can be referenced the next time a decision must be made and will be drawn from as a positive solution.

James argued that if the ability to make judgements of regret, moral approval and moral disapproval were absent, that would mean our will was predetermined. He states that "the problem is a very 'personal' one and that he cannot personally conceive of the universe as a place where murder must happen." In other words, if there were no regrets or judgments then all the bad things would not be considered bad, but merely as predetermined because there are no options of 'good' and 'bad'. Pragmatically, the idea of free will is truer, as "it better accommodates the judgments of regret and morality." Overall, James uses this line of reasoning to prove that our will is indeed free: because of our morality codes, and the conceivable alternate universes where a decision has been regarded different from what we chose.

James gave a simple example by asking his students to consider his choice for walking home from Lowell Lecture Hall after his talk:

What is meant by saying that my choice of which way to walk home after the lecture is ambiguous and matter of chance?... It means that both Divinity Avenue and Oxford Street are called but only one, and that one either one, shall be chosen.

This example lays out a two-stage decision process with chance in a present time of random alternatives, leading to a choice of one possibility that transforms an ambiguous future into a simple unalterable past. James's two-stage model separates chance (undetermined alternative possibilities) from choice (the free action of the individual, on which randomness has no effect). Subsequent thinkers using this model include Henri Poincaré, Arthur Holly Compton, and Karl Popper.

==== Hard determinism, soft determinism (compatibilism) and indeterminism ====
In 1884, James set the terms for all future discussions of determinism and compatibilism in the free will debates with his lecture to Harvard Divinity School students published as "The Dilemma of Determinism". In this talk he defined the common terms hard determinism and soft determinism (now more commonly called compatibilism):

Old-fashioned determinism was what we may call hard determinism. It did not shrink from such words as fatality, bondage of the will, necessitation, and the like. Nowadays, we have a soft determinism which abhors harsh words, and, repudiating fatality, necessity, and even predetermination, says that its real name is freedom; for freedom is only necessity understood, and bondage to the highest is identical with true freedom.

James called compatibilism a "quagmire of evasion", just as the ideas of Thomas Hobbes and David Hume—that free will was simply freedom from external coercion—were called a "wretched subterfuge" by Immanuel Kant.

Indeterminism is "the belief in freedom [which] holds that there is some degree of possibility that is not necessitated by the rest of reality." The word "some" in this definition is crucial in James's argument because it leaves room for a higher power, as it does not require that all events be random. Specifically, indeterminism does not say that no events are guaranteed or connected to previous events; instead, it says that some events are not guaranteed – some events are up to chance. In James's model of free will, choice is deterministic, determined by the person making it, and it "follows causally from one's character, values, and especially feelings and desires at the moment of decision." Chance, on the other hand, is indeterministic, and pertains to possibilities that could happen but are not guaranteed. James described chance as neither hard nor soft determinism, but "indeterminism" as the "notion of alternative possibility, this admission that any one of several things may come to pass is, after all, only a roundabout name for chance."

=== Philosophy of religion ===
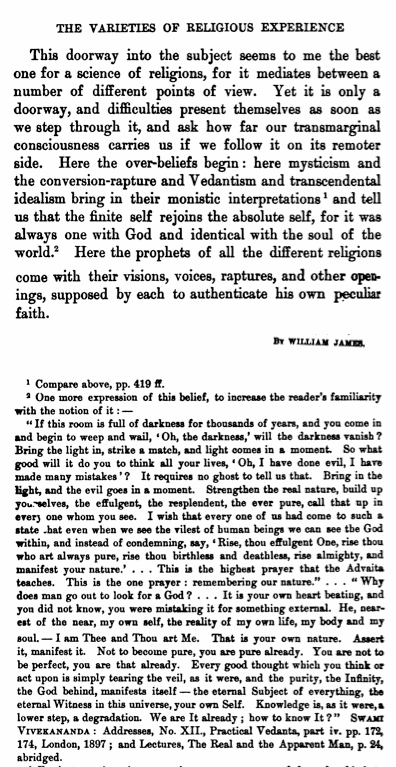
Excerpt

James also contributed to the philosophy of religion. In his Gifford Lectures at the University of Edinburgh he provided a wide-ranging account of The Varieties of Religious Experience (1902) and interpreted them according to his pragmatic leanings. Some of the important claims he makes in this regard were the following:

- Religious genius (experience) should be the primary topic in the study of religion, rather than religious institutions—since institutions are merely the social descendant of genius.
- The intense, even pathological varieties of experience (religious or otherwise) should be sought by psychologists, because they represent the closest thing to a microscope of the mind—that is, they show us in drastically enlarged form the normal processes of things.
- In order to usefully interpret the realm of common, shared experience and history, we must each make certain "over-beliefs" in things which, while they cannot be proven on the basis of experience, help us to live fuller and better lives.
- A variety of characteristics can be seen within a single individual. There are subconscious elements that compose the scattered fragments of a personality. This is the reflection of a greater dissociation which is the separation between science and religion.
- Religious Mysticism is only one half of mysticism, the other half is composed of the insane and both of these are co-located in the "great subliminal or transmarginal region".

American Philosophy: An Encyclopedia classes him as one of several figures who "took a more pantheist or pandeist approach by rejecting views of God as separate from the world."

James was an advocate of theistic finitism, which he used to explain the problem of evil.

==== Mysticism ====
James devoted much of his career to the psychological investigation of mysticism. This led him to experiment with chloral hydrate (1870), amyl nitrite (1875), nitrous oxide (1882), and peyote (1896). Inspired by a report by Benjamin Paul Blood in 1874, James experimented with inhaled nitrous oxide, upon which he experienced a "tremendously exciting sense of an intense metaphysical illumination" in which "every opposition ... vanished in a higher unity" and "the ego and its objects ... are one." Having been an ardent anti-Hegelian, James claimed that it was only when he was under the influence of nitrous oxide that he was able to understand Hegel. He concluded that while the revelations of the mystic hold true, they hold true only for the mystic; for others, they are certainly ideas to be considered, but can hold no claim to truth without personal experience of such. He was powerfully affected by the event and struggled greatly to interpret it. His journey of self discovery instigated by the experience is largely what inspired his later in-depth investigations of mysticism.

James provided a description of mystical experience in The Varieties of Religious Experience. He posits four criteria as "sufficient to mark out a group of states of consciousness" which may be called the "mystical group".

These criteria are:

- Ineffability – no adequate report of the contents of the experience can be given by words. This was the "handiest" of descriptors for James, and illustrates the necessity of direct, first-hand experience to actually understand a mystical state of consciousness.
- Noetic quality – "...mystical states seem to those who experience them to be also states of knowledge." Mystical consciousness generates a feeling of insight into truths inaccessible to ordinary reasoning. These intuitions or insights are often felt as authoritative both during and after they are experienced, but are necessarily confined by the first criterion of ineffability, and are thus inexpressible in words.
- Transiency – the mystical state is unable to be sustained for long periods of time. They are, however, recognisable upon re-experience, and can be further developed over multiple occasions.
- Passivity – a feeling of suspension of control of one's personal will, occasionally as if grasped by a superior power.

For James, the first two attributes, ineffability and the noetic quality, "will entitle any state to be called mystical, in the sense in which I use the word." The qualities of transiency and passivity are "less sharply marked, but are usually found". He uses a number of historical examples to illustrate the presence of these attributes in geographically and temporally disparate instances, concluding that the mystical experience "is on the whole pantheistic and optimistic, or at least the opposite of pessimistic. It is anti-naturalistic, and harmonizes best with twice-bornness and so-called other-worldly states of mind" (original italics).

In line with his pragmatism, James asserted that the epistemological authority of mystical consciousness for the individual who experiences it is may be rightfully justified, but that others are under no obligation to accept that authority uncritically. Importantly, however, the mere existence of mystical states necessarily indicates an incompleteness in the epistemological authority of the non-mystical. He would continue to advocate for the acceptance of mystical states as a fruitful subject of psychological research and source of knowledge. In his book The Pluralistic Universe (1909), James would expand upon his notion of "radical empiricism" in arguing for the possible association of empiricism and religion in the study of human spirituality. In viewing mysticism from a psychological perspective, he believed that the limits of our being extend far beyond what is ordinarily accessible by our sense perception, and that our finite beings are affected by unconscious forces, "But that which produces effects within another reality must be termed a reality itself, so I feel as if we had no philosophic excuse for calling the unseen or mystical world unreal."

James viewed mysticism as the structuring aspect of religion. While he grants that religious experience reveals the possibility of a union with something greater than oneself, he clarifies that mysticism and philosophy identify that something as an "all-inclusive soul of the world" that he does not deem wholly necessary for a practical and fulfilling religious life. As elsewhere in his work, James is averse to any dogmatic or absolutist doctrines, within religion and without, and thus values mysticism as a unique method of personal acquaintance with a larger reality.

===== Mediumship and telepathy =====
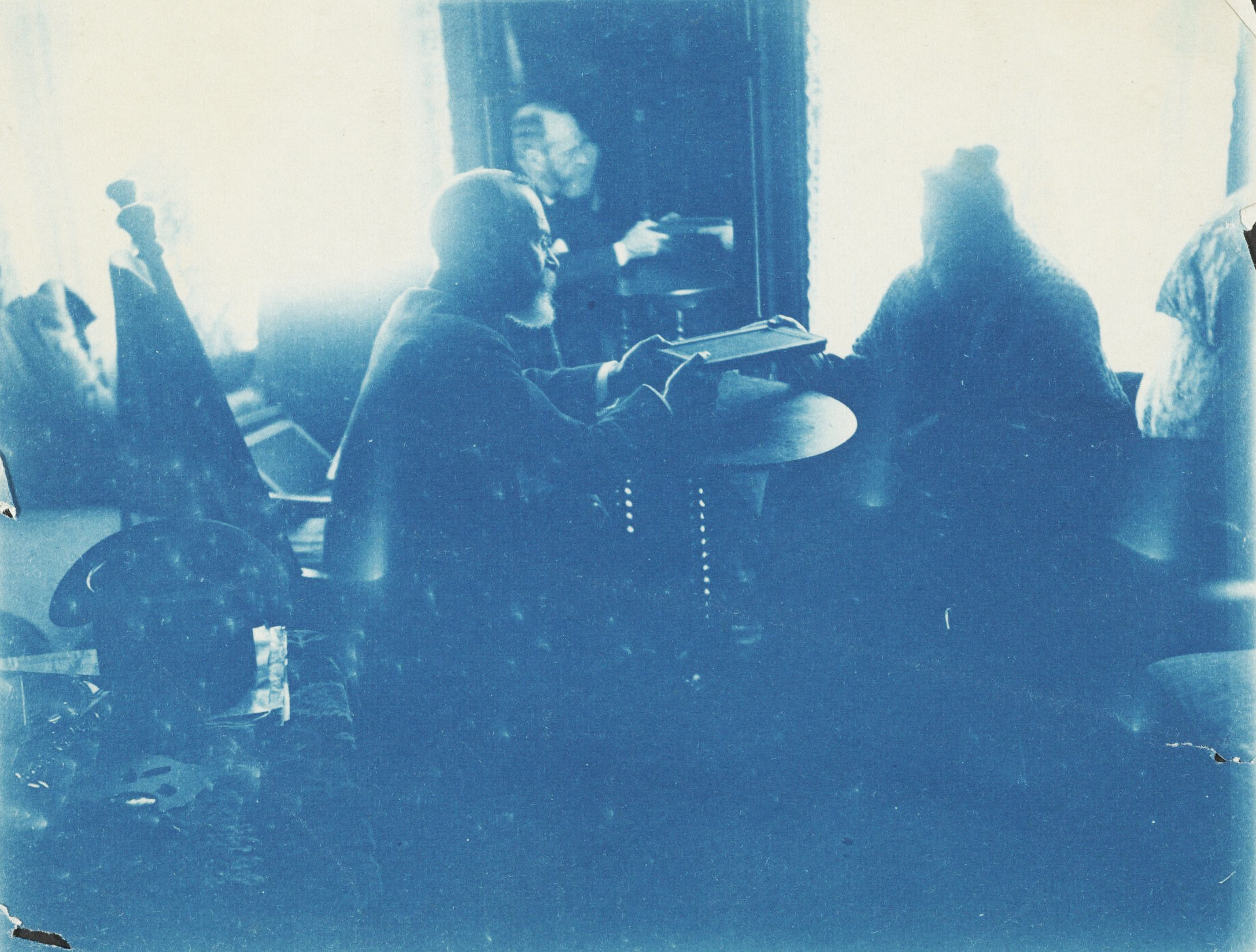
James in a séance with a spiritualist medium

James was a founding member and vice president of the American Society for Psychical Research. The lending of his name made Leonora Piper a famous medium. In 1885, the year after the death of his young son, James had his first sitting with Piper at the suggestion of his mother-in-law. He was soon convinced that Piper knew things she could only have discovered by supernatural means. He expressed his belief in Piper by saying, "If you wish to upset the law that all crows are black, it is enough if you prove that one crow is white. My white crow is Mrs. Piper." However, James did not believe that Piper was in contact with spirits. After evaluating sixty-nine reports of Piper's mediumship he considered the hypothesis of telepathy as well as Piper obtaining information about her sitters by natural means such as her memory recalling information. According to James the "spirit-control" hypothesis of her mediumship was incoherent, irrelevant and in cases demonstrably false.

James held séances with Piper and was impressed by some of the details he was given; however, according to Massimo Polidoro a maid in the household of James was friendly with a maid in Piper's house and this may have been a source of information that Piper used for private details about James. Bibliographers Frederick Burkhardt and Fredson Bowers who compiled the works of James wrote "It is thus possible that Mrs. Piper's knowledge of the James family was acquired from the gossip of servants and that the whole mystery rests on the failure of the people upstairs to realize that servants [downstairs] also have ears."

James was convinced that the "future will corroborate" the existence of telepathy. Psychologists such as James McKeen Cattell and Edward B. Titchener took issue with James's support for psychical research and considered his statements unscientific. Cattell in a letter to James wrote that the "Society for Psychical Research is doing much to injure psychology".

==== View on spiritualism and associationism ====
James studied closely the schools of thought known as associationism and spiritualism.

Associationism is the view that each experience one has leads to another, creating a chain of events. The association does not tie together two ideas, but two physical objects. This association occurs on an atomic level. Small physical changes occur in the brain which eventually form complex ideas or associations. Thoughts are formed as these complex ideas work together and lead to new experiences. Isaac Newton and David Hartley both were precursors to this school of thought, proposing such ideas as "physical vibrations in the brain, spinal cord, and nerves are the basis of all sensations, all ideas, and all motions...". James disagreed with associationism in that he believed it to be too simple. He referred to associationism as "psychology without a soul" because there is nothing from within creating ideas; they just arise by associating objects with one another.

Spiritualism, on the other hand, is the view that mental events are attributed to the soul. Whereas in associationism, ideas and behaviors are separate, in spiritualism, they are connected. Spiritualism encompasses innatism, which argues that ideas cause behavior. Ideas of past behavior influence the way a person will act in the future, and all these ideas are all tied together by the soul. Therefore, an inner soul causes one to have a thought, which leads them to perform a behavior, and memory of past behaviors determine how one will act in the future.

As a pragmatist, James took the view that one should use the parts of theories that make the most sense and can be proven. Therefore, he recommended analyzing spiritualism and associationism and using those of their parts making the most sense. Influenced by Emanuel Swedenborg, who introduced him to the idea, James believed that each person has a soul, which exists in a spiritual universe, and leads a person to perform the behaviors they do in the physical world. James stated that, although it does appear that humans use associations to move from one event to the next, this cannot be done without this soul tying everything together. For, after an association has been made, it is the person who decides which part of it to focus on, and therefore determines in which direction following associations will lead. Associationism is too simple in that it does not account for decision-making of future behaviors, and memory of what worked well and what did not. Spiritualism, however, does not demonstrate actual physical representations for how associations occur. James combined the views of spiritualism and associationism to create his own way of thinking. James discussed tender-minded thinkers as religious, optimistic, dogmatic, and monistic. Tough-minded thinkers were irreligious, pessimistic, pluralists, and skeptical. Healthy-minded individuals were seen as natural believers by having faith in God and universal order. People who focused on human miseries and suffering were noted as sick souls.

=== Philosophy of history ===
One of the long-standing schisms in the philosophy of history concerns the role of individuals in social change.

One faction sees individuals (as seen in Dickens' A Tale of Two Cities and Thomas Carlyle's The French Revolution, A History) as the motive power of history, and broader society as the page on which they write their acts. The other sees society as moving according to holistic principles or laws, and sees individuals as its more-or-less willing pawns.

In 1880, James contributed to this discussion with "Great Men, Great Thoughts, and the Environment", an essay published in the Atlantic Monthly. He took Carlyle's side, but without Carlyle's one-sided emphasis on the political/military sphere, upon heroes as the founders or overthrowers of states and empires. A philosopher, according to James, must accept geniuses as a given entity the same way as a biologist accepts as an entity Darwin's "spontaneous variations". The role of an individual will depend on the degree of its conformity with the social environment, epoch, moment, etc. James introduces a notion of receptivities of the moment. The societal mutations from generation to generation are determined (directly or indirectly) mainly by the acts or examples of individuals whose genius was so adapted to the receptivities of the moment or whose accidental position of authority was so critical that they became ferments, initiators of movements, setters of precedent or fashion, centers of corruption, or destroyers of other persons, whose gifts, had they had free play, would have led society in another direction.

=== View on social Darwinism ===
While James accepted Darwin's theories of biological evolution, he regarded social Darwinism as propagated by philosophers such as Herbert Spencer to be a sham. He was highly skeptical of applying Darwin's formula of natural selection to human societies in a way that put the Anglo-Saxons on top of the chain. James' rejection of social Darwinism was a minority opinion at Harvard in the 1870s and 1880s.

== Psychology ==
=== Instincts ===
Like Sigmund Freud, James was influenced by Charles Darwin's theory of natural selection. At the core of James's theory of psychology, as defined in The Principles of Psychology (1890), was a system of "instincts". James wrote that humans had many instincts, even more than other animals. These can be overridden by experience and by each other, as many of the instincts are actually in conflict with each other.

=== Intelligence ===
James defined intelligence as the ability to use novel methods to solve problems.

=== Theory of emotion ===
James is one of the two namesakes of the James–Lange theory of emotion, which he formulated independently of Carl Lange in the 1880s. The theory holds that emotion is the mind's perception of physiological conditions that result from some stimulus.

In 1884, James published his article "What is an Emotion?" in Mind. This article was important, not because it definitively answered the question it raised, but because of the way in which James phrased his response. He conceived of an emotion in terms of a sequence of events that starts with the occurrence of an arousing stimulus (the sympathetic nervous system or the parasympathetic nervous system); and ends with a passionate feeling, a conscious emotional experience.

In "What is an Emotion?", James gave his oft-cited example of a bear. He asked the question: do we run from a bear because we are afraid or are we afraid because we run? He answered this saying that, it is not that we see a bear, fear it, and run; we see a bear and run; consequently, we fear the bear. I.e. we run because we are afraid, was wrong, and instead argued that we are afraid because we run:

Our natural way of thinking about... emotions is that the mental perception of some fact excites the mental affection called emotion, and that this latter state of mind gives rise to the bodily expression. My theory, on the contrary, is that the bodily changes follow directly the perception of the exciting fact, and that our feeling of the same changes as they occur IS the emotion (called 'feeling' by Damasio).

For James, our mind's perception of our bodily responses, e.g. higher adrenaline level, racing heart, tight stomach, sweaty palms, tense muscles, and so on; sympathetic nervous system, is the emotion. Emotions feel different from other states of mind because they have these bodily responses that give rise to internal sensations, and different emotions feel different from one another because they are accompanied by different bodily responses and sensations. The mental aspect of emotion, the feeling, is a slave to its physiology, not vice versa: we do not tremble because we are afraid or cry because we feel sad; we are afraid because we tremble and are sad because we cry. In each case, the physiological responses return to the brain in the form of bodily sensations, and the unique pattern of sensory feedback gives each emotion its unique quality. For example, the bodily experience of seeing the bear (fear), will be quite different from other experiences, such as experiencing elation or grief - each have their own physiological signature.

==== Legacy and consequences ====
This way of thinking about emotion has great consequences for the philosophy of aesthetics as well as to the philosophy and practice of education. Here is a passage from his work, The Principles of Psychology, that spells out those consequences:

[W]e must immediately insist that aesthetic emotion, pure and simple, the pleasure given us by certain lines and masses, and combinations of colours and sounds, is an absolutely sensational experience, an optical or auricular feeling that is primary, and not due to the repercussion backwards of other sensations elsewhere consecutively aroused. To this simple primary and immediate pleasure in certain pure sensations and harmonious combinations of them, there may, it is true, be added secondary pleasures; and in the practical enjoyment of works of art by the masses of mankind these secondary pleasures play a great part. The more classic one's taste is, however, the less relatively important are the secondary pleasures felt to be, in comparison with those of the primary sensation as it comes in. Classicism and romanticism have their battles over this point.

A major goal of emotion research today is still to elucidate James' stimulus-to-feeling sequence—to figure out what processes come between the stimulus and the feeling.

James' theory of emotion was also independently developed in Italy by the anthropologist Giuseppe Sergi.

=== Theory of the self ===
James' theory of the self divided a person's mental picture of self into two categories: the "Me" and the "I". The "Me" can be thought of as a separate object or individual a person refers to when describing their personal experiences; while the "I" is the self that knows who they are and what they have done in their life. Both concepts are depicted in the statement; "I know it was me who ate the cookie." The "Me" is part of self the "empirical me" and the "I" part "the pure Ego". James called the "I" the thinking self, which cannot be further divided. He linked this part of the self to the soul of a person, or what is now thought of as the mind. James further divided the "Me" part of self into: a material, a social, and a spiritual self, as below.

Educational theorists have been inspired in various ways by James's theory of self, and have developed various applications to curricular and pedagogical theory and practice.

==== Material self ====
The material self consists of things that belong to a person or entities that a person belongs to. For James, the core of the material self is the body. Second to the body, are a person's clothes. James believed a person's clothes were one way a person expresses who they feel they are; or clothes are a way to show status and are therefore facets of forming and maintaining one's self-image. Money and family are also critical parts of the material self. James felt that if one lost a family member, a part of who they are was also lost. Money figured in one's material self in a similar way; if a person had significant money then lost it, who they were as a person changed as well.

==== Social self ====
Our social selves are who we are in a given social situation. James argued that people change how they act depending on the social situation that they are in. For example, a person may act in a different way at work when compared to how that same person may act when they are out with a group of friends. Thus, people have as many social selves as they do social situations they participate in. James also believed that in a given social group, an individual's social self may be divided even further. An example of this would be, in the social context of an individual's work environment, the difference in behavior when that individual is interacting with their boss versus their behavior when interacting with a co-worker.

==== Spiritual self ====
For James, the spiritual self was who we are at our core; it is more concrete or permanent than the other two selves. It is our subjective and most intimate self. Aspects of a spiritual self include things like personality, core values, and conscience that do not typically change throughout an individual's lifetime. The spiritual self involves introspection, or looking inward to deeper spiritual, moral, or intellectual questions without the influence of objective thoughts. For James, achieving a high level of understanding of who we are at our core, or understanding our spiritual selves, is more rewarding than satisfying the needs of the social and material selves.

==== Pure ego ====
The pure ego is what James refers to as the "I" self, similar to what we think of as the soul, or the mind. It is what provides the thread of continuity between our past, present, and future selves. The pure ego's perception of consistent individual identity arises from a continuous stream of consciousness. James argued that it is not a substance and therefore cannot be examined by science.

== Personal life ==
James was engaged to Alice Howe Gibbens on May 10, 1878, and they were married on July 10. They had 5 children: Henry (May 18, 1879 – 1947), William (June 17, 1882 – 1961), Herman (1884, died in infancy), Margaret (March 1887 – 1950) and Alexander (December 22, 1890 – 1946).

Of James's five children, two—Margaret and Alexander—are known to have had children. Descendants of Alexander are still living.

=== Ancestry ===
Most of William James's ancestors arrived in America from Scotland or Ireland in the 18th century. Many of them settled in eastern New York or New Jersey. His ancestors were Protestant, and heavily involved with their church. They were well educated and worked as farmers, merchants, and traders.

The last ancestor to arrive in America was William James's paternal grandfather also named William James, who went to America from Ballyjamesduff, County Cavan, Ireland in 1789 when he was 18 years old. There is suspicion that he fled to America because his family tried to force him into the ministry. After traveling to America and with no money left, he found a job at a store as a clerk. After continuously working, he was able to own the store himself. As he traveled west to find more job opportunities, he was involved in various other jobs such as the salt industry and the Erie Canal project. After being a significant worker in the Erie Canal project and helping Albany become a major center of trade, he became the first vice-president of the Albany Savings Bank. William James (grandfather) went from being a poor Irish immigrant to one of the richest men in New York. After his death, his son Henry James inherited his fortune and lived in Europe and the United States searching for the meaning of life.

== Legacy ==
James was remembered as one of America's representative thinkers, psychologist, and philosopher.

President Jimmy Carter's Moral Equivalent of War Speech, on April 17, 1977, equating the United States' 1970s energy crisis, oil crisis, and the changes and sacrifices Carter's proposed plans would require with the "moral equivalent of war", may have borrowed its title and much of its theme from James's classic essay "The Moral Equivalent of War" derived from his last speech, delivered at Stanford University in 1906, and published in 1910, in which "James considered one of the classic problems of politics: how to sustain political unity and civic virtue in the absence of war or a credible threat", and which "sounds a rallying cry for service in the interests of the individual and the nation".

== Works ==
=== Psychology ===
1. The Principles of Psychology, 2 vols. (1890), Harvard University Press, Cambridge, Massachusetts and London, England 1981 (3 volumes), volume 1: ISBN 0-674-70559-9, volume 2: ISBN 978-0-674-70559-3, and volume 3: ISBN 978-0-674-70555-5
2. Psychology (Briefer Course) (1892), Harvard University Press, Cambridge, Massachusetts and London, England 1984 ISBN 0-674-72102-0, ISBN 978-0-674-72102-9
3. Talks to Teachers on Psychology: and to Students on Some of Life's Ideals (1899), Harvard University Press, Cambridge, Massachusetts and London, England 1983 ISBN 978-0-674-86785-7, ISBN 978-0-674-86785-7
4. Essays in Psychology (1983) - posthumous collection of 29 papers on psychological topics, Harvard University Press, Cambridge, Massachusetts and London, England ISBN 0-674-26714-1, ISBN 978-0-674-26714-5

=== Philosophy ===
- Is Life Worth Living? (1895), the seminal lecture delivered at Harvard on April 15, 1895
- The Will to Believe, and Other Essays in Popular Philosophy (1897)
- Human Immortality: Two Supposed Objections to the Doctrine (the Ingersoll Lecture, 1897)
  - The Will to Believe, Human Immortality (1956) Dover Publications, ISBN 0-486-20291-7
- The Varieties of Religious Experience: A Study in Human Nature (1902), ISBN 0-14-039034-0
- Pragmatism: A New Name for Some Old Ways of Thinking (1907), Hackett Publishing 1981: ISBN 0-915145-05-7, Dover 1995: ISBN 0-486-28270-8
- A Pluralistic Universe (1909), Hibbert Lectures, University of Nebraska Press 1996: ISBN 0-8032-7591-9
- The Meaning of Truth: A Sequel to "Pragmatism" (1909), Prometheus Books, 1997: ISBN 1-57392-138-6
- Some Problems of Philosophy: A Beginning of an Introduction to Philosophy (1911), University of Nebraska Press 1996: ISBN 0-8032-7587-0
- Memories and Studies (1911), Reprint Services Corp: 1992: ISBN 0-7812-3481-6
- Essays in Radical Empiricism (1912), Dover Publications 2003, ISBN 0-486-43094-4
  - critical edition, Frederick Burkhardt and Fredson Bowers, editors. Harvard University Press 1976: ISBN 0-674-26717-6 (includes commentary, notes, enumerated emendations, appendices with English translation of "La Notion de Conscience")
- Letters of William James, 2 vols. (1920)
- Collected Essays and Reviews (1920)
- Ralph Barton Perry, The Thought and Character of William James, 2 vols. (1935), Vanderbilt University Press 1996 reprint: ISBN 0-8265-1279-8 (contains some 500 letters by William James not found in the earlier edition of the Letters of William James)
- William James on Psychical Research (1960)
- The Correspondence of William James, 12 vols. (1992–2004) University of Virginia Press, ISBN 0-8139-2318-2
- "The Dilemma of Determinism"
- William James on Habit, Will, Truth, and the Meaning of Life, James Sloan Allen, ed. Frederic C. Beil, Publisher, ISBN 978-1-929490-45-5

=== Collections ===
- William James: Writings 1878–1899 (1992). Library of America, 1212 p., ISBN 978-0-940450-72-1

Psychology: Briefer Course (rev. and condensed Principles of Psychology), The Will to Believe and Other Essays in Popular Philosophy, Talks to Teachers and Students, Essays (nine others

- William James: Writings 1902–1910 (1987). Library of America, 1379 p., ISBN 978-0-940450-38-7

The Varieties of Religious Experience, Pragmatism, A Pluralistic Universe, The Meaning of Truth, Some Problems of Philosophy, Essays

- The Writings of William James: A Comprehensive Edition (1978). University of Chicago Press, 912 pp., ISBN 0-226-39188-4

Pragmatism, Essays in Radical Empiricism, and A Pluralistic Universe complete; plus selections from other works

- In 1975, Harvard University Press began publication of a standard edition of The Works of William James.
- William James: Essays in Pragmatism (1966). The Hafner Library of Classics

Edited with an Introduction by Alburey Castell Professor of Philosophy, University of Minnesota

== See also ==
- "The Moral Philosopher and the Moral Life"
- Psychology of religion
- American philosophy
- List of American philosophers
- William James Lectures
- William James Society
