= F. C. S. Schiller =

German-born British philosopher (1864-1937)

F. C. S. Schiller FBA
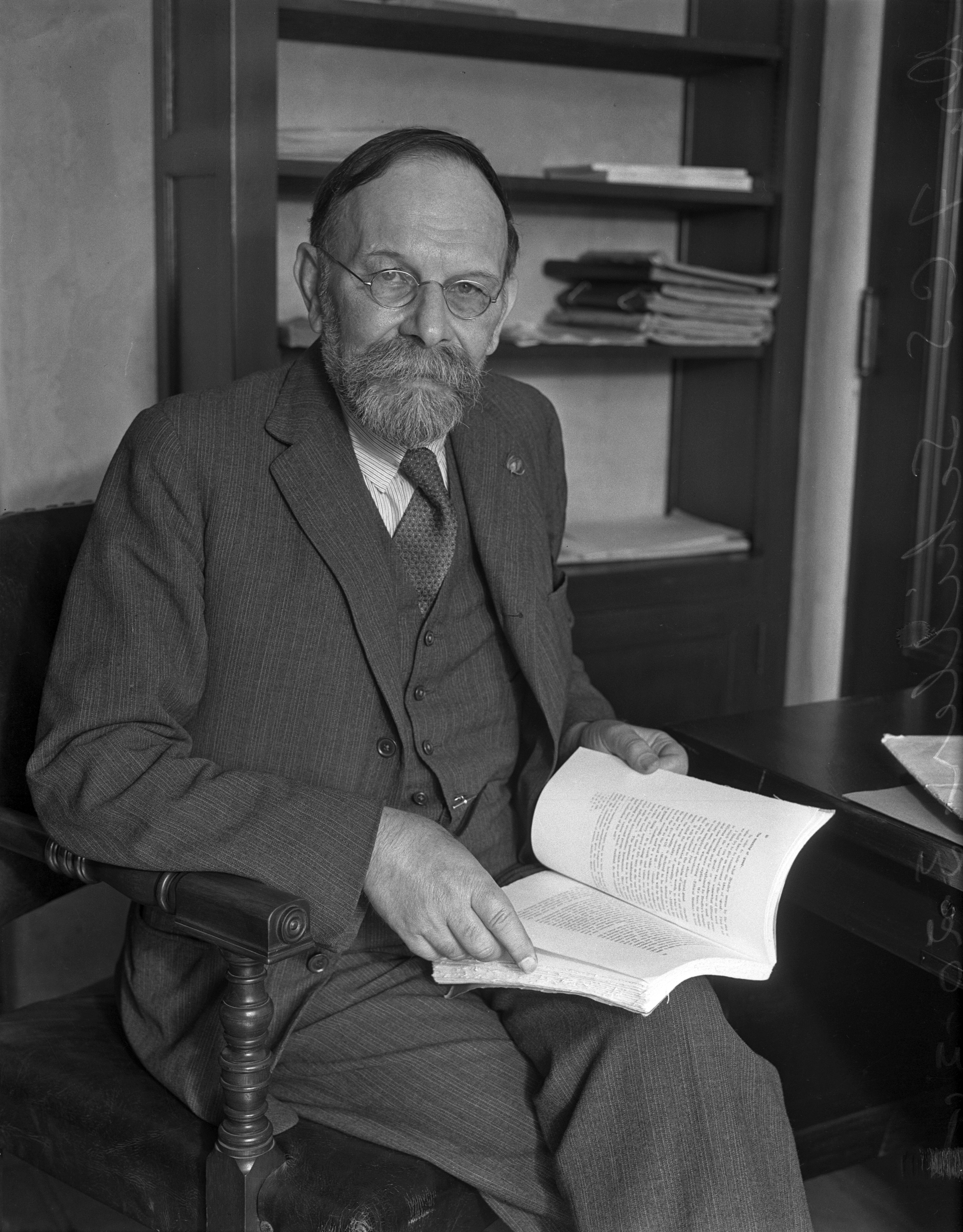
- Born: Ferdinand Canning Scott Schiller; 16 August 1864; Ottensen near Altona, Duchy of Holstein, German Confederation
- Died: 6 August 1937 (aged 72); Los Angeles, California, U.S.

Education
- Education: Rugby School; Balliol College, Oxford (B.A., 1887)

Philosophical work
- Era: 19th-/20th-century philosophy
- Region: Western philosophy
- School: Pragmatism
- Institutions: Corpus Christi College, Oxford
- Main interests: Pragmatism, logic, ordinary language philosophy, epistemology, eugenics, meaning, personalism
- Notable ideas: Criticism of formal logic, justification of axioms as hypotheses (a form of pragmatism), intelligent design, eugenics

Ferdinand Canning Scott Schiller (German: [ˈʃɪlɐ]; 16 August 1864 – 6 August 1937), usually cited as F. C. S. Schiller, was a German-British philosopher. Born in Altona, Holstein (at that time a member of the German Confederation, but under Danish administration), Schiller studied at the University of Oxford, later became a professor there, after being invited back after a brief time at Cornell University. Later in his life, he taught at the University of Southern California. In his lifetime, he was well known as a philosopher; after his death, his work was largely forgotten.

Schiller's philosophy was very similar to and often aligned with the pragmatism of William James, although Schiller referred to it as "humanism". He argued vigorously against ideas like logical positivism, absolute idealism (such as F. H. Bradley), and the type of determinism written about by Bertrand Russell.

== Life ==
Born in 1864, one of three brothers and the son of Ferdinand Schiller (a Calcutta merchant), Schiller's family home was in Switzerland. Schiller grew up in Rugby. He was educated at Rugby School, and then went on to study at Balliol College. He would graduate in the first class of Literae Humaniores, going on to win the 1887 Taylorian scholarship for German. Schiller's first book, Riddles of the Sphinx (1891), was an immediate success despite his use of a pseudonym because of his fears concerning how the book would be received. Between the years 1893 and 1897, he was an instructor in philosophy at Cornell University. In 1897 he returned to Oxford and became fellow and tutor of Corpus Christi for more than thirty years. Schiller was president of the Aristotelian Society in 1921, and was for many years treasurer of the Mind Association. In 1926 he was elected a fellow of the British Academy. In 1929 he was appointed visiting professor at the University of Southern California, and spent half of each year in the United States and half in England. Schiller died in Los Angeles on 6, 7 or 9 August 1937 after a long and lingering illness.

Schiller also published three books on the subject of eugenics; Tantalus or the Future of Man (1924), Eugenics and Politics (1926), and Social Decay and Eugenic Reform (1932).

== Philosophy ==
In 1891, Schiller made his first contribution to philosophy anonymously. Schiller feared that in his time of high naturalism, the metaphysical speculations of his Riddles of the Sphinx were likely to hurt his professional prospects (p. xi, Riddles). However, Schiller's fear of reprisal from his anti-metaphysical colleagues should not suggest that Schiller was a friend of metaphysics. Like his fellow pragmatists across the ocean, Schiller was attempting to stake out an intermediate position between both the spartan landscape of naturalism and the speculative excesses of the metaphysics of his time. In Riddles Schiller both,

(1) accuses naturalism (which he also sometimes calls "pseudometaphysics" or "positivism") of ignoring the fact that metaphysics is required to justify our natural description of the world, and
(2) accuses "abstract metaphysics" of losing sight of the world we actually live in and constructing grand, disconnected imaginary worlds.

The result, Schiller contends, is that naturalism cannot make sense of the "higher" aspects of our world (free will, consciousness, God, purpose, universals), while abstract metaphysics cannot make sense of the "lower" aspects of our world (the imperfect, change, physicality). In each case, we are unable to guide our moral and epistemological "lower" lives to the achievement of life's "higher" ends, ultimately leading to scepticism on both fronts. For knowledge and morality to be possible, both the world's lower and higher elements must be real; e.g. we need universals (a higher) to make knowledge of particulars (a lower) possible. This would lead Schiller to argue for what he at the time called a "concrete metaphysics", but would later call "humanism".

Shortly after publishing Riddles of the Sphinx, Schiller became acquainted with the work of pragmatist philosopher William James and this changed the course of his career. For a time, Schiller's work became focused on extending and developing James' pragmatism (under Schiller's preferred title, "humanism"). Schiller even revised his earlier work Riddles of the Sphinx to make the nascent pragmatism implicit in that work more explicit. In one of Schiller's most prominent works during this phase of his career, "Axioms as Postulates" (1903), Schiller extended James' will to believe doctrine to show how it could be used to justify not only an acceptance of God, but also our acceptance of causality, of the uniformity of nature, of our concept of identity, of contradiction, of the law of excluded middle, of space and time, of the goodness of God, and more.

Towards the end of his career, Schiller's pragmatism began to take on a character more distinct from the pragmatism of William James. Schiller's focus became his opposition to formal logic. To understand Schiller's opposition to formal logic, consider the following inference:

(1) All salt is soluble in water;
(2) Cerebos is not soluble in water;
(3) Therefore, Cerebos is not a salt.

From the formal characteristics of this inference alone (All As are Bs; c is not a B; Therefore, c is not an A), formal logic would judge this to be a valid inference. Schiller, however, refused to evaluate the validity of this inference merely on its formal characteristics. Schiller argued that unless we look to the contextual fact regarding what specific problem first prompted this inference to actually occur, we can not determine whether the inference was successful (i.e. pragmatically successful). In the case of this inference, since "Cerebos is 'salt' for culinary, but not for chemical purposes", without knowing whether the purpose for this piece of reasoning was culinary or chemical, we cannot determine whether this is valid or not. In another example, Schiller discusses the truth of formal mathematics "1+1=2" and points out that this equation does not hold if one is discussing drops of water. Schiller's attack on formal logic and formal mathematics never gained much attention from philosophers; however it does share some weak similarities to the contextualist view in contemporary epistemology as well as the views of ordinary language philosophers.

=== Opposition to naturalism and metaphysics ===
In Riddles, Schiller gives historical examples of the dangers of abstract metaphysics in the philosophies of Plato, Zeno, and Hegel, portraying Hegel as the worst offender: "Hegelianism never anywhere gets within sight of a fact, or within touch of reality. And the reason is simple: you cannot, without paying the penalty, substitute abstractions for realities; the thought-symbol cannot do duty for the thing symbolized".

Schiller argued that the flaw in Hegel's system, as with all systems of abstract metaphysics, is that the world it constructs always proves to be unhelpful in guiding our imperfect, changing, particular, and physical lives to the achievement of the "higher" universal Ideals and Ends. For example, Schiller argues that the reality of time and change is intrinsically opposed to the very modus operandi of all systems of abstract metaphysics. He says that the possibility to change is a precondition of any moral action (or action generally), and so any system of abstract metaphysics is bound to lead us into a moral scepticism. The problem lies in the aim of abstract metaphysics for "interpreting the world in terms of conceptions, which should be true not here and now, but "eternally" and independently of Time and Change." The result is that metaphysics must use conceptions that have the "time-aspect of Reality" abstracted away. Of course, "[o]nce abstracted from,"

the reference to Time could not, of course, be recovered, any more than the individuality of Reality can be deduced, when once ignored. The assumption is made that, to express the 'truth' about Reality, its 'thisness,' individuality, change and its immersion in a certain temporal and spatial environment may be neglected, and the timeless validity of a conception is thus substituted for the living, changing and perishing existence we contemplate. ... What I wish here to point out is merely that it is unreasonable to expect from such premises to arrive at a deductive justification of the very characteristics of Reality that have been excluded. The true reason, then, why Hegelism can give no reason for the Time-process, i.e. for the fact that the world is 'in time,' and changes continuously, is that it was constructed to give an account of the world irrespective of time and change. If you insist on having a system of eternal and immutable 'truth,' you can get it only by abstracting from those characteristics of reality, which we try to express by the terms individuality, time, and change. But you must pay the price for a formula that will enable you to make assertions that hold good far beyond the limits of your experience. And it is part of the price that you will in the end be unable to give a rational explanation of those very characteristics, which you dismissed at the outset as irrelevant to a rational explanation.

While abstract metaphysics provides us with a world of beauty and purpose and various other "highers", it condemns other key aspects of the world we live in as imaginary. The world of abstract metaphysics has no place for imperfect moral agents who (1) strive to learn about the world and then (2) act upon the world to change it for the better. Consequently, abstract metaphysics condemns us as illusionary, and declares our place in the world as unimportant and purposeless. Where abstractions take priority, our concrete lives collapse into scepticism and pessimism.

He also makes a case against the alternative naturalist method, saying that this too results in an epistemological and moral scepticism. Schiller looks to show this method's inadequacy at moving from the cold, lifeless lower world of atoms to the higher world of ethics, meanings, and minds. As with abstract metaphysics, Schiller attacks naturalism on many fronts: (1) the naturalist method is unable to reduce universals to particulars, (2) the naturalist method is unable to reduce free will to deterministic movements, (3) the naturalist method is unable to reduce emergent properties like consciousness to brain activity, (4) the naturalist method is unable to reduce God to a pantheism, and so on. Just as the abstract method cannot find a place for the lower elements of our world inside the higher, the naturalist method cannot find a place for the higher elements of our world inside the lower. In a reversal of abstract metaphysics, naturalism denies the reality of the higher elements to save the lower. Schiller uses the term "pseudo-metaphysical" here instead of naturalism—as he sometimes does—because he is accusing these naturalist philosophers of trying to solve metaphysical problems while sticking to the non-metaphysical "lower" aspects of the world (i.e. without engaging in real metaphysics):

The pseudo-metaphysical method puts forward the method of science as the method of philosophy. But it is doomed to perpetual failure. ... [T]he data supplied by the physical sciences are intractable, because they are data of a lower sort than the facts they are to explain.

The objects of the physical sciences form the lower orders in the hierarchy of existence, more extensive but less significant. Thus the atoms of the physicist may indeed be found in the organisation of conscious beings, but they are subordinate: a living organism exhibits actions which cannot be formulated by the laws of physics alone; man is material, but he is also a great deal more.

To show that the world's higher elements do not reduce to the lower is not yet to show that naturalism must condemn the world's higher elements as illusionary. A second component to Schiller's attack is showing that naturalism cannot escape its inability to reduce the higher to the lower by asserting that these higher elements evolve from the lower. However, Schiller does not see naturalism as any more capable of explaining the evolution of the higher from the lower than it is capable of reducing the higher to the lower. While evolution does begin with something lower that in turn evolves into something higher, the problem for naturalism is that whatever the starting point for evolution is, it must first be something with the potential to evolve into a higher. For example, the world cannot come into existence from nothing because the potential or "germ" of the world is not "in" nothing (nothing has no potential, it has nothing; after all, it is nothing). Likewise, biological evolution cannot begin from inanimate matter, because the potential for life is not "in" inanimate matter. The following passage shows Schiller applying the same sort of reasoning to the evolution of consciousness:

Taken as the type of the pseudo-metaphysical method, which explains the higher by the lower ... it does not explain the genesis of consciousness out of unconscious matter, because we cannot, or do not, attribute potential consciousness to matter. ... the theory of Evolution derives the [end result] from its germ, i.e., from that which was, what it became, potentially.

Unable to either reduce or explain the evolution of the higher elements of our world, naturalism is left to explain away the higher elements as mere illusions. In doing this, naturalism condemns us to scepticism in both epistemology and ethics. It is worth noting that while Schiller's work has been largely neglected since his death, Schiller's arguments against a naturalistic account of evolution have been recently cited by advocates of intelligent design to establish the existence of a longer history for the view due to legal concerns in the United States (see: Kitzmiller v. Dover Area School District).

=== Humanist alternative to metaphysics and naturalism ===
Schiller argued that both abstract metaphysics and naturalism portray man as holding an intolerable position in the world. He proposed a method that not only recognises the lower world we interact with, but takes into account the higher world of purposes, ideals and abstractions. Schiller:

We require, then, a method which combines the excellencies of both the pseudo-metaphysical and the abstract metaphysical, if philosophy is to be possible at all.

Schiller was demanding a course correction in the field of metaphysics, putting it at the service of science. For example, to explain the creation of the world out of nothing, or to explain the emergence or evolution of the "higher" parts of the world, Schiller introduces a divine being who might generate the end (i.e. Final Cause) which gives nothingness, lifelessness, and unconscious matter the purpose (and thus potential) of evolving into higher forms:

And thus, so far from dispensing with the need for a Divine First Cause, the theory of evolution, if only we have the faith in science to carry it to its conclusion, and the courage to interpret it, proves irrefragably that no evolution was possible without a pre-existent Deity, and a Deity, moreover, transcendent, non-material and non-phenomenal. ... [T]he world process is the working out of an anterior purpose or idea in the divine consciousness.

This re-introduction of teleology (which Schiller sometimes calls a re-anthropomorphizing of the world) is what Schiller says the naturalist has become afraid to do. Schiller's method of concrete metaphysics (i.e. his humanism) allows for an appeal to metaphysics when science demands it. However:

[T]he new teleology would not be capricious or random in its application, but firmly rooted in the conclusions of the sciences ... The process which the theory of Evolution divined the history of the world to be, must have content and meaning determined from the basis of the scientific data; it is only by a careful study of the history of a thing that we can determine the direction of its development, [and only then] that we can be said to have made the first approximation to the knowledge of the End of the world process. [This] is teleology of a totally different kind to that which is so vehemently, and on the whole so justly dreaded by the modern exponents of natural science. It does not attempt to explain things anthropocentrically, or regard all creation as existing for the use and benefit of man; it is as far as the scientist from supposing that cork-trees grow to supply us with champagne corks. The end to which it supposes all things to subserve is ... the universal End of the world-process, to which all things tend[.]

Schiller finally reveals what this "End" is which "all things tend":

If our speculations have not entirely missed their mark, the world-process will come to an end when all the spirits whom it is designed to harmonise [by its Divine Creator] have been united in a perfect society.

Now, while by today's philosophic standards Schiller's speculations would be considered wildly metaphysical and disconnected from the sciences, compared with the metaphysicians of his day (Hegel, McTaggart, etc.), Schiller saw himself as radically scientific. Schiller gave his philosophy a number of labels during his career. Early on he used the names "Concrete Metaphysics" and "Anthropomorphism", while later in life tending towards "Pragmatism" and particularly "Humanism".

=== The will to believe ===
Schiller also developed a method of philosophy intended to mix elements of both naturalism and abstract metaphysics in a way that allows us to avoid the twin scepticisms each method collapses into when followed on its own. However, Schiller does not assume that this is enough to justify his humanism over the other two methods. He accepts the possibility that both scepticism and pessimism are true.

To justify his attempt to occupy the middle ground between naturalism and abstract metaphysics, Schiller makes a move that anticipates James' will to believe doctrine:

And in action especially we are often forced to act upon slight possibilities. Hence, if it can be shown that our solution is a possible answer, and the only possible alternative to pessimism, to a complete despair of life, it would deserve acceptance, even though it were but a bare possibility.

Schiller contends that in light of the other methods' failure to provide humans with a role and place in the universe, we ought avoid the adoption of these methods. By the end of Riddles, Schiller offers his method of humanism as the only possible method that results in a world where we can navigate our lower existence to the achievement of our higher purpose. He asserts that it is the method we ought to adopt regardless of the evidence against it ("even though it were but a bare possibility").

While Schiller's will to believe is a central theme of Riddle of the Sphinx (appearing mainly in the introduction and conclusion of his text), in 1891 the doctrine held a limited role in Schiller's philosophy. In Riddles, Schiller only employs his version of the will to believe doctrine when he is faced with overcoming sceptical and pessimistic methods of philosophy. In 1897, William James published his essay "The Will to Believe" and this influenced Schiller to drastically expand his application of the doctrine. For a 1903 volume titled Personal Idealism, Schiller contributed a widely read essay titled "Axioms as Postulates" in which he sets out to justify the "axioms of logic" as postulates adopted on the basis of the will to believe doctrine. In this essay, Schiller extends the will to believe doctrine to be the basis of our acceptance of causality, of the uniformity of nature, of our concept of identity, of contradiction, of the law of excluded middle, of space and time, of the goodness of God, and more. He notes that we postulate that nature is uniform because we need nature to be uniform:

[O]ut of the hurly-burly of events in time and space [we] extract[ ] changeless formulas whose chaste abstraction soars above all reference to any 'where' or 'when,' and thereby renders them blank cheques to be filled up at our pleasure with any figures of the sort. The only question is—Will Nature honour the cheque? Audentes Natura juvat—let us take our life in our hands and try! If we fail, our blood will be on our own hands (or, more probably, in some one else's stomach), but though we fail, we are in no worse case than those who dared not postulate ... Our assumption, therefore, is at least a methodological necessity; it may turn out to be (or be near) a fundamental fact in nature [an axiom].

Schiller stresses that doctrines like the uniformity of nature must first be postulated on the basis of need (not evidence) and only then "justified by the evidence of their practical working." He attacks both empiricists like John Stuart Mill, who try to conclude that nature is uniform from previous experience, as well as Kantians who conclude that nature is uniform from the preconditions on our understanding. Schiller argues that preconditions are not conclusions, but demands made on our experience that may or may not work. On this success hinges our continued acceptance of the postulate and its eventual promotion to axiom status.

In "Axioms and Postulates" Schiller vindicates the postulation by its success in practice, marking an important shift from Riddles of a Sphinx. In Riddles, Schiller is concerned with the vague aim of connecting the "higher" to the "lower" so he can avoid scepticism, but by 1903 he has clarified the connection he sees between these two elements. The "higher" abstract elements are connected to the lower because they are our inventions for dealing with the lower; their truth depends on their success as tools. Schiller dates the entry of this element into his thinking in his 1892 essay "Reality and 'Idealism'" (a mere year after his 1891 Riddles).

>The plain man's 'things,' the physicist's 'atoms,' and Mr. Ritchie's 'Absolute,' are all of them more or less preserving and well-considered schemes to interpret the primary reality of phenomena, and in this sense Mr. Ritchie is entitled to call the 'sunrise' a theory. But the chaos of presentations, out of which we have (by criteria ultimately practical) isolated the phenomena we subsequently call sunrise, is not a theory, but the fact which has called all theories into being. In addition to generating hypothetical objects to explain phenomena, the interpretation of reality by our thought also bestows a derivative reality on the abstractions with which thought works. If they are the instruments wherewith thought accomplishes such effects upon reality, they must surely be themselves real.

The shift in Schiller's thinking continues in his next published work, The Metaphysics of the Time-Process (1895): The abstractions of metaphysics, then, exist as explanations of the concrete facts of life, and not the latter as illustrations of the former ... Science [along with humanism] does not refuse to interpret the symbols with which it operates; on the contrary, it is only their applicability to the concrete facts originally abstracted from that is held to justify their use and to establish their 'truth.'

Schiller's accusations against the metaphysician in Riddles now appear in a more pragmatic light. His objection is similar to one we might make against a worker who constructs a flat-head screwdriver to help him build a home, and who then accuses a screw of unreality when he comes upon a Phillips-screw that his flat-head screwdriver won't fit. In his works after Riddles, Schiller's attack takes the form of reminding the abstract metaphysician that abstractions are meant as tools for dealing with the "lower" world of particulars and physicality, and that after constructing abstractions we cannot simply drop the un-abstracted world out of our account. The un-abstracted world is the entire reason for making abstractions in the first place. We did not abstract to reach the unchanging and eternal truths; we abstract to construct an imperfect and rough tool for dealing with life in our particular and concrete world. It is the working of the higher in "making predictions about the future behavior of things for the purpose of shaping the future behavior of things for the purpose of shaping our own conduct accordingly" that justifies the higher.

To assert this methodological character of eternal truths is not, of course, to deny their validity ... To say that we assume the truth of abstraction because we wish to attain certain ends, is to subordinate theoretic 'truth' to a teleological implication; to say that, the assumption once made, its truth is 'proved' by its practical working ... For the question of the 'practical' working of a truth will always ultimately be found to resolve itself into the question whether we can live by it.

A few lines down from this passage, Schiller adds the following footnote in a 1903 reprint of the essay: "All this seems a very fairly definite anticipation of modern pragmatism." Indeed, it resembles the pragmatist theory of truth. However, Schiller's pragmatism was still very different from both that of William James and that of Charles Sanders Peirce.

=== Opposition to logic ===
As early as 1891, Schiller had independently reached a doctrine very similar to William James' "Will to Believe". As early as 1892 Schiller had independently developed his own pragmatist theory of truth. However, Schiller's concern with meaning was one he entirely imports from the pragmatisms of James and Peirce. Later in life, Schiller musters all of these elements of his pragmatism to make a concerted attack on formal logic. Concerned with bringing down the timeless, perfect worlds of abstract metaphysics early in life, the central target of Schiller's developed pragmatism is the abstract rules of formal logic. Statements, Schiller contends, cannot possess meaning or truth abstracted away from their actual use. Therefore, examining their formal features instead of their function in an actual situation is to make the same mistake the abstract metaphysician makes. Symbols are meaningless scratches on paper unless they are given a life in a situation, and meant by someone to accomplish some task. They are tools for dealing with concrete situations, and not the proper subjects of study themselves.

Both Schiller's theory of truth and meaning (i.e. Schiller's pragmatism) derive their justification from an examination of thought from what he calls his humanist viewpoint (his new name for concrete metaphysics). He informs us that to answer "what precisely is meant by having a meaning" will require us to "raise the prior question of why we think at all.". A question Schiller of course looks to evolution to provide.

Schiller provides a detailed defence of his pragmatist theories of truth and meaning in a chapter titled "The Biologic of Judgment" in Logic for Use (1929). The account Schiller lays out in many ways resembles some of what Peirce asserts in his "The Fixation of Belief" (1877) essay:

Our account of the function of Judgment in our mental life will, however, have to start a long way back. For there is much thinking before there is any judging, and much living before there is any thinking. Even in highly developed minds judging is a relatively rare incident in thinking, and thinking in living, an exception rather than the rule, and a relatively recent acquisition.

...

For the most part the living organism adapts itself to its conditions of life by earlier, easier, and quicker expedients. Its actions or reactions are mostly 'reflex actions' determined by inherited habits which largely function automatically ... It follows from this elaborate and admirable organisation of adaptive responses to stimulation that organic life might proceed without thinking altogether. ... This is, in fact, the way in which most living beings carry on their life, and the plane on which man also lives most of the time.

Thought, therefore, is an abnormality which springs from a disturbance. Its genesis is connected with a peculiar deficiency in the life of habit. ... Whenever ... it becomes biologically important to notice differences in roughly similar situations, and to adjust action more closely to the peculiarities of a particular case, the guidance of life by habit, instinct, and impulse breaks down. A new expedient has somehow to be devised for effecting such exact and delicate adjustments. This is the raison d'etre of what is variously denominated 'thought,' 'reason,' 'reflection,' 'reasoning,' and 'judgment[.]'

...

Thinking, however, is not so much a substitute for the earlier processes as a subsidiary addition to them. It only pays in certain cases, and intelligence may be shown also by discerning what they are and when it is wiser to act without thinking. ... Philosophers, however, have very mistaken ideas about rational action. They tend to think that men ought to think all the time, and about all things. But if they did this they would get nothing done, and shorten their lives without enhancing their merriment. Also they utterly misconceive the nature of rational action. They represent it as consisting in the perpetual use of universal rules, whereas it consists rather in perceiving when a general rule must be set aside in order that conduct may be adapted to a particular case.

This passage of Schiller was worth quoting at length because of the insight this chapter offers into Schiller's philosophy. In the passage, Schiller makes the claim that thought only occurs when our unthinking habits prove themselves inadequate for handling a particular situation. Schiller's stressing of the genesis of limited occurrences of thought sets Schiller up for his account of meaning and truth.

Schiller asserts that when a person utters a statement in a situation, they are doing so for a specific purpose: to solve the problem that habit could not handle alone. The meaning of such a statement is whatever contribution it makes to accomplishing the purpose of this particular occurrence of thought. The truth of the statement will be if it helps accomplish that purpose. No utterance or thought can be given a meaning or a truth valuation outside the context of one of these particular occurrences of thought. This account of Schiller's is a much more extreme view than even James took.

At first glance, Schiller appears very similar to James. However, Schiller's more stringent requirement that meaningful statements have consequences "to some one for some purpose" makes Schiller's position more extreme than James'. For Schiller, it is not a sufficient condition for meaningfulness that a statement entail experiential consequences (as it is for both Peirce and James). Schiller requires that the consequences of a statement make the statement relevant to some particular person's goals at a specific moment in time if it is to be meaningful. Therefore, it is not simply enough that the statement "diamonds are hard" and the statement "diamonds are soft" entail different experiential consequences; it is also required that the experiential difference makes a difference to someone's purposes. Only then, and only to that person, do the two statements state something different. If the experiential difference between hard and soft diamonds did not connect up with my purpose for entering into thought, the two statements would possess the same meaning. For example, if I were to randomly blurt out "diamonds are hard" and then "diamonds are soft" to everyone in a coffee shop one day, my words would mean nothing. Words can only mean something if they are stated with a specific purpose.

Consequently, Schiller rejects the idea that statements can have meaning or truth when they are looked upon in the abstract, away from a particular context. "Diamonds are hard" only possesses meaning when stated (or believed) at some specific situation, by some specific person, uttered (or believed) for some specific aim. It is the consequences the statement holds for that person's purposes which constitute its meaning, and its usefulness in accomplishing that person's purposes that constitutes the statement's truth or falsity. After all, when we look at the sentence "diamonds are hard" in a particular situation, we may find it actually has nothing to say about diamonds. A speaker may very well be using the sentence as a joke, as a code phrase, or even simply as an example of a sentence with 15 letters. Which the sentence really means cannot be determined without the specific purpose a person might be using the statement for in a specific context.

In an article titled "Pragmatism and Pseudo-pragmatism" Schiller defends his pragmatism against a particular counterexample in a way that sheds considerable light on his pragmatism:

The impossibility of answering truly the question whether the 100th (or 10,000th) decimal in the evaluation of Pi is or is not a 9, splendidly illustrates how impossible it is to predicate truth in abstraction from actual knowing and actual purpose. For the question cannot be answered until the decimal is calculated. Until then no one knows what it is, or rather will turn out to be. And no one will calculate it, until it serves some purpose to do so, and some one therefore interests himself in the calculation. And so until then the truth remains uncertain: there is no 'true' answer, because there is no actual context in which the question has really been raised. We have merely a number of conflicting possibilities, not even claims to truth, and there is no decision. Yet a decision is possible if an experiment is performed. But his experiment presupposes a desire to know. It will only be made if the point becomes one which it is practically important to decide. Normally no doubt it does not become such, because for the actual purposes of the sciences it makes no difference whether we suppose the figure to be 9 or something else. I.e. the truth to, say, the 99th decimal, is ' true enough ' for our purposes, and the 100th is a matter of indifference. But let that indifference cease, and the question become important, and the ' truth ' will at once become ' useful '. Prof. Taylor's illustration therefore conclusively proves that in an actual context and as an actual question there is no true answer to be got until the truth has become useful. This point is illustrated also by the context Prof. Taylor has himself suggested. For he has made the question about the 100th decimal important by making the refutation of the whole pragmatist theory of knowledge depend on it. And what nobler use could the 100th decimal have in his eyes? If in consequence of this interest he will set himself to work it out, he will discover this once useless, but now most useful, truth, and—triumphantly refute his own contention!

We might recognise this claim as the sort of absurdity many philosophers try to read into the pragmatism of William James. James, however, would not agree that the meaning of "the 100th decimal of Pi is 9" and "the 100th decimal of Pi is 6" mean the same thing until someone has a reason to care about any possible difference. Schiller, in constant, does mean to say this. James and Schiller both treat truth as something that happens to a statement, and so James would agree that it only becomes true that the 100th decimal of Pi is 9 when someone in fact believes that statement and it leads them to their goals, but nowhere does James imply that meaning is something that happens to a statement. That is a unique element of Schiller's pragmatism.

=== Humanist theory of meaning and truth ===
While Schiller felt greatly indebted to the pragmatism of William James, Schiller was outright hostile to the pragmatism of C.S. Peirce. Both Schiller and James struggled with what Peirce intended with his pragmatism, and both were often baffled by Peirce's insistent rebuffing of what they both saw as the natural elaboration of the pragmatist cornerstone he himself first laid down. On the basis of his misunderstandings, Schiller complains that for Peirce to merely say "'truths should have practical consequences'" is to be "very vague, and hints at no reason for the curious connexion it asserts." Schiller goes on to denigrate Peirce's principle as nothing more than a simple truism "which hardly deserves a permanent place and name in philosophic usage". After all, Schiller points out, "[i]t is hard ... to see why even the extremest intellectualism should deny that the difference between the truth and the falsehood of an assertion must show itself in some visible way."

With Peirce's attempts to restrict the use of pragmatism set aside, Schiller unpacks the term "consequences" to provide what he considers as a more substantial restatement of Peirce's pragmatism:

For to say that a [statement] has consequences and that what has none is meaningless, must surely mean that it has a bearing upon some human interest; they must be consequences to some one for some purpose.

Schiller believes his pragmatism to be more developed because of its attention to the fact that the "consequences" which make up the meaning and truth of a statement must always be consequences for someone's particular purposes at some particular time. Continuing his condemnation of the abstract, Schiller contends that the meaning of a concept is not the consequences of some abstract proposition, but what consequences an actual thinker hopes its use will bring about in an actual situation. The meaning of a thought is what consequences one means to bring about when they employ the thought. To Schiller, this is what a more sophisticated pragmatist understands by the term meaning.

If we are to understand the pragmatic theory of meaning in Schiller's way, he is right to claim that James' theory of truth is a mere corollary of the pragmatist theory of meaning:

But now, we may ask, how are these 'consequences' to test the 'truth' claimed by the assertion? Only by satisfying or thwarting that purpose, by forwarding or baffling that interest. If they do the one, the assertion is 'good' and pro tanto 'true'; if they do the other, 'bad' and 'false'. Its 'consequences,' therefore, when investigated, always turn out to involve the 'practical' predicates 'good ' or 'bad,' and to contain a reference to ' practice' in the sense in which we have used that term. So soon as therefore we go beyond an abstract statement of the narrower pragmatism, and ask what in the concrete, and in actual knowing, 'having consequences ' may mean, we develop inevitably the full-blown pragmatism in the wider sense.

Given Schiller's view that the meaning of a thought amounts to the consequences one means to bring about by the thought, Schiller further concluded that the truth of a thought depends on whether it actually brings about the consequences one intended. For example, if while following a cooking recipe that called for salt I were to think to myself, "Cerebos is salt", my thought will be true if it consequently leads me to add Cerebos and produce a dish with the intended taste. However, if while working in a chemistry lab to produce a certain mixture I were to think to myself, "Cerebos is salt", my thought would both have a different meaning than before (since my intent now differs) and be false (since Cerebos is only equivalent to salt for culinary purposes). According to Schiller, the question of what a thought like "Cerebos is salt" means or whether it is true can only be answered if the specific circumstances with which the thought arose are taken into consideration. While there is some similarity here between Schiller's view of meaning and the later ordinary language philosophers, Schiller's account ties meaning and truth more closely to individuals and their intent with a specific use rather than whole linguistic communities.

== Selected works ==
- Riddles of the Sphinx (1891)
- "Axioms as Postulates" (published in the collection Personal Idealism, 1902)
- "Useless 'Knowledge': A Discourse Concerning Pragmatism" (January 1902)
- Humanism (1903)
- "The Ethical Basis of Metaphysics" (July 1903)
- "The Definition of 'Pragmatism' and 'Humanism'" (January 1905)
- Studies in Humanism (1907)
- Plato or Protagoras? (1908)
- Riddles of the Sphinx (1910, revised edition)
- Humanism (1912, second edition)
- Formal Logic (1912)
- Problems of Belief (1924, second edition)
- Logic for Use (1929)
- Our Human Truths (1939, published posthumously)
