= Overbelief =

Belief adopted that requires more evidence than one presently has

Overbelief (also written as over-belief) is a philosophical term for a belief adopted that requires more evidence than one presently has. It is also described as a kind of metaphysical belief ascribed with the status of speculative view that exceeds available evidence or evidencing reason. Generally, acts of overbelief are justified on emotional need or faith, and a need to make sense of spiritual experience, rather than on empirical evidence. This idea originates from the works of William James in The Varieties of Religious Experience and refers to the conceptual framework that individuals have.

== Concept ==
James describes overbeliefs as "buildings-out performed by the intellect into directions of which feeling originally supplied the hint". In overbelief, James explained the role of human temperament in philosophy, and particularly how it creates a bias on the part of a philosopher that could be stronger than any of his more objective premises. James maintained that overbelief is based on temperament instead of objective evidence or universal reason. He stressed, however, that overbelief is qualified in the sense that it is provisional and that one's own overbelief is valid on account of the diversity of human consciousness and that the different experiences all have meaning. This idea underpins James argument concerning the validity of religion, showing its connection with the scientific understanding of psychology. He has established overbelief as a way of understanding how individuals and cultures systematically interpret faith experiences. The concept was also treated as the basis of the strong inclination or the parti pris that allows the faithful to resist the onslaught of hostile facts against their beliefs.

According to James, a typical example of an overbelief would be R. W. Trine's contention that "The great central fact of the universe is that spirit of infinite life and power that is back of all, that manifests itself in and through all." James acknowledges that his own over-beliefs are so minimal that to some religious believers they may seem like "under-beliefs". It is noted that James' own overbelief can be demonstrated in his belief in the reality of an unseen order that is capable of producing real effects in our world.

== See also ==
- Will to Believe Doctrine
- William James
