= The Will to Believe =

1896 lecture by William James

"The Will to Believe" is a lecture by William James, first published in 1896, which defends, in certain cases, the adoption of a belief without sufficient evidence of its truth. In particular, James is concerned in this lecture about defending the rationality of religious faith even lacking sufficient evidence of religious truth. James states in his introduction: "I have brought with me tonight ... an essay in justification of faith, a defense of our right to adopt a believing attitude in religious matters, in spite of the fact that our merely logical intellect may not have been coerced. 'The Will to Believe,' accordingly, is the title of my paper."

James' central argument in "The Will to Believe" hinges on the idea that access to the evidence for whether certain beliefs are true depends crucially upon first adopting those beliefs without evidence. As an example, James argues that it can be rational to have unsupported faith in one's own ability to accomplish tasks that require confidence. Importantly, James points out that this is the case even for pursuing scientific inquiry. James then argues that like belief in one's own ability to accomplish a difficult task, religious faith can also be rational even if one at the time lacks evidence for the truth of one's religious belief.

== The lecture ==
James' "The Will to Believe" and William K. Clifford's essay "The Ethics of Belief" are touchstones for many contemporary debates over evidentialism, faith, and overbelief. James' "The Will to Believe" consists of introductory remarks followed by ten numbered but not titled sections. In his introductory remarks, James characterizes his lecture by stating that he had "brought with me tonight ... an essay in justification of faith, a defence of our right to adopt a believing attitude in religious matters, in spite of the fact that our merely logical intellect may not have been coerced. "The Will to Believe", accordingly, is the title of my paper." At the end of his introductory remarks, James leads into his first section by stating that he "must begin by setting up some technical distinctions."

=== Sections I–III: Preliminaries ===
In section I, James embarks upon the task of defining a number of important terms he will be relying upon throughout the lecture:

- Live and dead hypotheses – "deadness and liveness ... are measured by [a thinker's] willingness to act. The maximum of liveness in a hypothesis means willingness to act irrevocably"
- Option – "the decision between two hypotheses"
- Living and dead option – "a living option is one in which both hypotheses are live ones"
- Forced and avoidable option – an option for which there is "no possibility of not choosing"
- Momentous and trivial option – an "option is trivial when the opportunity is not unique, when the stake is insignificant, or when the decision is reversible if it later proves unwise"
- Genuine option – "we may call an option a genuine option when it is of the forced, living, and momentous kind"
- Belief – "A chemist finds a hypothesis live enough to spend a year in its verification: he believes in it to that extent."

In section II, James begins by saying he will then consider "the actual psychology of human opinion." Here James considers and largely agrees with the criticism of Pascal's Wager that we either should not or are unable to believe or disbelieve at will. That is, James here seems to reject doxastic voluntarism, "the philosophical doctrine according to which people have voluntary control over their beliefs." In section III, however, James qualifies his endorsement of this criticism of Pascal's Wager by arguing that "it is only our already dead hypotheses that our willing nature is unable to bring to life again." By which James means that it is only things we already disbelieve that we are unable to believe at will.

=== Section IV: Thesis ===
In his very brief section IV, James introduces the main thesis of the work:

Our passional nature not only lawfully may, but must, decide an option between propositions, whenever it is a genuine option that cannot by its nature be decided on intellectual grounds; for to say under such circumstances, "Do not decide, but leave the question open," is itself a passional decision—just like deciding yes or not—and is attended with the same risk of losing truth.

Before providing an argument for this thesis, James ends this section by stating that he must still "indulge in a bit more of preliminary work."

=== Sections V–VII: More preliminaries ===
In section V, James makes a distinction between a skepticism about truth and its attainment and what he calls "dogmatism": "that truth exists, and that our minds can find it." Concerning dogmatism, James states that it has two forms; that there is an "absolutist way" and an "empiricist way" of believing in truth. James states: "The absolutists in this matter say that we not only can attain to knowing truth, but we can know when we have attained to knowing it, while the empiricists think that although we may attain it, we cannot infallibly know when." James then goes on to state that "the empiricist tendency has largely prevailed in science, while in philosophy the absolutist tendency has had everything its own way."

James ends section V by arguing that empiricists are really no more tentative about their beliefs and conclusions than the absolutists: "The greatest empiricists among us are only empiricists on reflection: when left to their instincts, they dogmatize like infallible popes. When the Cliffords tell us how sinful it is to be Christians on such "insufficient evidence", insufficiency is really the last thing they have in mind. For them the evidence is absolutely sufficient, only it makes the other way. They believe so completely in an anti-Christian order of the universe that there is no living option: Christianity is a dead hypothesis from the start."

James begins section VI with the following question: "But now, since we are all such absolutists by instinct, what in our quality of students of philosophy ought we to do about the fact? Shall we espouse and endorse it?" He then answers: "I sincerely believe that the latter course is the only one we can follow as reflective men. ... I am, therefore, myself a complete empiricist so far as my theory of human knowledge goes."

James ends section VI by stressing what he finds to be the "great difference" merit of the empiricist way over the absolutist way: "The strength of his system lies in the principles, the origin, the terminus a quo [the beginning point] of his thought; for us the strength is in the outcome, the upshot, the terminus ad quem [the end result]. Not where it comes from but what it leads to is to decide. It matters not to an empiricist from what quarter a hypothesis may come to him: he may have acquired it by fair means or by foul; passion may have whispered or accident suggested it; but if the total drift of thinking continues to confirm it, that is what he means by its being true."

James begins section VII by stating that there is "one more point, small but important, and our preliminaries are done." However, James in fact gives in this section a crucial bit of argumentation:

There are two ways of looking at our duty in the matter of opinion—ways entirely different, and yet ways about whose difference the theory of knowledge seems hitherto to have shown very little concern. We must know the truth; and we must avoid error—these are our first and great commandments as would-be knowers; but they are not two ways of stating an identical commandment, they are two separable laws. Although it may indeed happen that when we believe the truth A, we escape as an incidental consequence from believing the falsehood B, it hardly ever happens that by merely disbelieving B we necessarily believe A. We may in escaping B fall into believing other falsehoods, C or D, just as bad as B; or we may escape B by not believing anything at all, not even A.

Believe truth! Shun error!—these, we see, are two materially different laws; and by choosing between them we may end by coloring differently our whole intellectual life. We may regard the chase for truth as paramount, and the avoidance of error as secondary; or we may, on the other hand, treat the avoidance of error as more imperative, and let truth take its chance. Clifford, in the instructive passage which I have quoted, exhorts us to the latter course. Believe nothing, he tells us, keep your mind in suspense forever, rather than by closing it on insufficient evidence incur the awful risk of believing lies. You, on the other hand, may think that the risk of being in error is a very small matter when compared with the blessings of real knowledge, and be ready to be duped many times in your investigation rather than postpone indefinitely the chance of guessing true. I myself find it impossible to go with Clifford. We must remember that these feelings of our duty about either truth or error are in any case only expressions of our passional life. Biologically considered, our minds are as ready to grind out falsehood as veracity, and he who says, "Better go without belief forever than believe a lie!" merely shows his own preponderant private horror of becoming a dupe. He may be critical of many of his desires and fears, but this fear he slavishly obeys. He cannot imagine any one questioning its binding force. For my own part, I have also a horror of being duped; but I can believe that worse things than being duped may happen to a man in this world: so Clifford's exhortation has to my ears a thoroughly fantastic sound. It is like a general informing his soldiers that it is better to keep out of battle forever than to risk a single wound. Not so are victories either over enemies or over nature gained. Our errors are surely not such awfully solemn things. In a world where we are so certain to incur them in spite of all our caution, a certain lightness of heart seems healthier than this excessive nervousness on their behalf. At any rate, it seems the fittest thing for the empiricist philosopher.

=== Sections VIII–X: Main argument ===
In section VIII, James finally moves beyond what he considers mere preliminaries. Here James first identifies areas of belief where he holds that to believe without evidence would be unjustified: "Wherever the option between losing truth and gaining it is not momentous, we can throw the chance of gaining truth away, and at any rate save ourselves from any chance of believing falsehood, by not making up our minds at all till objective evidence has come. In scientific questions, this is almost always the case ... The questions here are always trivial options, the hypotheses are hardly living (at any rate not living for us spectators), the choice between believing truth or falsehood is seldom forced." James concludes this section by asking us to agree "that wherever there is no forced option, the dispassionately judicial intellect with no pet hypothesis, saving us, as it does from dupery at any rate, ought to be our ideal."

In section IX, James moves to investigate whether there are areas of belief where belief without evidence would be justified. James gives self-fulfilling beliefs as one example of such beliefs:

Do you like me or not?—for example. Whether you do or not depends, in countless instances, on whether I meet you half-way, am willing to assume that you must like me, and show you trust and expectation. The previous faith on my part in your liking's existence is in such cases what makes your liking come. But if I stand aloof, and refuse to budge an inch until I have objective evidence, until you shall have done something apt ... ten to one your liking never comes. ... The desire for a certain kind of truth here brings about that special truth's existence; and so it is in innumerable cases of other sorts. Who gains promotions, boons, appointments, but the man in whose life they are seen to play the part of live hypotheses, who discounts them, sacrifices other things for their sake before they have come, and takes risks for them in advance? His faith acts on the powers above him as a claim, and creates its own verification.

From examples like these, James concludes: "There are, then, cases where a fact cannot come at all unless a preliminary faith exists in its coming. And where faith in a fact can help create the fact, that would be an insane logic which should say that faith running ahead of scientific evidence is the "lowest kind of immorality" into which a thinking being can fall."

James says that "Science can tell us what exists; but to compare the worths, both of what exists and of what does not exist, we must consult not science, but what Pascal calls our heart". Science does this when it "lays it down that the infinite ascertainment of fact and correction of false belief are the supreme goods for man. Challenge the statement, and science can only repeat it oracularly, or else prove it by showing that such ascertainment and correction bring man all sorts of other goods which man's heart in turn declares." James rejects this latter idea in the case of religion as it is a "forced option", meaning that "we cannot escape the issue by remaining sceptical and waiting for more light, because, although we do avoid error in that way if religion be untrue, we lose the good, if it be true".

James begins section X with the thesis that he takes himself to have already proven: "In truths dependent on our personal action, then, faith based on desire is certainly a lawful and possibly an indispensable thing." James then goes on to argue that, like the examples he gave in section IX, religious belief is also the sort of belief that depends on our personal action and therefore can also justifiably be believed through a faith based on desire:

We feel, too, as if the appeal of religion to us were made to our own active good-will, as if evidence might be forever withheld from us unless we met the hypothesis half-way. To take a trivial illustration: just as a man who in a company of gentlemen made no advances, asked a warrant for every concession, and believed no one's word without proof, would cut himself off by such churlishness from all the social rewards that a more trusting spirit would earn—so here, one who should shut himself up in snarling logicality and try to make the gods extort his recognition willy-nilly, or not get it at all, might cut himself off forever from his only opportunity of making the gods' acquaintance. This feeling, forced on us we know not whence, that by obstinately believing that there are gods (although not to do so would be so easy both for our logic and our life) we are doing the universe the deepest service we can, seems part of the living essence of the religious hypothesis. If the hypothesis were true in all its parts, including this one, then pure intellectualism, with its veto on our making willing advances, would be an absurdity; and some participation of our sympathetic nature would be logically required. I, therefore, for one, cannot see my way to accepting the agnostic rules for truth-seeking, or wilfully agree to keep my willing nature out of the game. I cannot do so for this plain reason, that a rule of thinking which would absolutely prevent me from acknowledging certain kinds of truth if those kinds of truth were really there, would be an irrational rule. That for me is the long and short of the formal logic of the situation, no matter what the kinds of truth might materially be.

Although James does not here explain the way in which the truth or evidence regarding religious belief depends upon our first having religious belief, he does argue that it is a part of the religious belief itself that its own truth or the evidence of its own truth depends upon our first believing it. In the preface to the published version of "The Will to Believe" James offers a different argument for the way in which the evidence for religion depends upon our belief. There he contends that it is through the failure or thriving of communities of religious believers that we come to have evidence of the truth of their religious beliefs. In this way, to acquire evidence for religious belief, we must first have believers who adopt such belief without sufficient evidence. Much later in life, in his "Pragmatism: A New Name for Some Old Ways of Thinking" lectures, James also mentions the possibility that God's existence may actually depend upon our belief in his existence.

== The doctrine ==
The doctrine James argues for in "The Will to Believe" appears often in both his earlier and later work. James himself changed the name of the doctrine several times. First appearing as "the duty to believe", then "the subjective method", then "the will to believe", it was finally recast by James as "the right to believe." Whatever the name, the doctrine always concerned the rationality of believing without evidence in certain instances. Specifically, James is defending the violation of evidentialism in two instances:

- Hypothesis venturing (see hypothetico-deductivism) – beliefs whose evidence becomes available only after they are believed
- Self-fulfilling beliefs – beliefs that by existing make themselves true.

After arguing that for hypothesis venturing and with self-fulfilling beliefs a person is rational to believe without evidence, James argues that a belief in a number of philosophical topics qualifies as one or other of his two allowed violations of evidentialism (e.g. free will, God, and immortality). The reason James takes himself as able to rationally justify positions often not believed to be verifiable under any method, is how important he thinks believing something can be for the verifying of that belief. That is to say, in these cases James is arguing that the reason evidence for a belief seems to be unavailable to us is because the evidence for its truth or falsity comes only after it is believed rather than before. For example, in the following passage James utilizes his doctrine to justify a belief that "this is a moral world":

It cannot then be said that the question, "Is this a moral world?" is a meaningless and unverifiable question because it deals with something non-phenomenal. Any question is full of meaning to which, as here, contrary answers lead to contrary behavior. And it seems as if in answering such a question as this we might proceed exactly as does the physical philosopher in testing an hypothesis. ... So here: the verification of the theory which you may hold as to the objectively moral character of the world can consist only in this—that if you proceed to act upon your theory it will be reversed by nothing that later turns up as your action's fruits; it will harmonize so well with the entire drift of experience that the latter will, as it were, adopt it. ... If this be an objectively moral universe, all acts that I make on that assumption, all expectations that I ground on it, will tend more and more completely to interdigitate with the phenomena already existing. ... While if it be not such a moral universe, and I mistakenly assume that it is, the course of experience will throw ever new impediments in the way of my belief, and become more and more difficult to express in its language. Epicycle upon epicycle of subsidiary hypothesis will have to be invoked to give to the discrepant terms a temporary appearance of squaring with each other; but at last even this resource will fail. (—William James, "The Sentiment of Rationality")

The doctrine James developed in his "The Will to Believe" lecture was later extended by his protégé F. C. S. Schiller in his lengthy essay "Axioms as Postulates". In this work, Schiller downplays the connection between James' doctrine and religious positions like God and immortality. Instead, Schiller stresses the doctrine's ability to justify our beliefs in the uniformity of nature, causality, space, time, and other philosophic doctrines that have generally been considered to be empirically unverifiable.

== Criticism ==
In 1907 University of Michigan Professor Alfred Henry Lloyd published "The Will to Doubt" in response, claiming that doubt was essential to true belief.

Charles Sanders Peirce ends his 1908 paper "A Neglected Argument for the Reality of God" complaining generally about what other philosophers had done with pragmatism, and ends with a criticism specifically of James' will to believe:

It seems to me a pity they [pragmatists like James, Schiller] should allow a philosophy so instinct with life to become infected with seeds of death in such notions as that of the unreality of all ideas of infinity and that of the mutability of truth, and in such confusions of thought as that of active willing (willing to control thought, to doubt, and to weigh reasons) with willing not to exert the will (willing to believe).

Bertrand Russell in "Free Thought and Official Propaganda" argued that one must always adhere to fallibilism, recognizing of all human knowledge that "None of our beliefs are quite true; all have at least a penumbra of vagueness and error", and that the only means of progressing ever-closer to the truth is never to assume certainty, but always examine all sides and try to reach a conclusion objectively.

Walter Kaufmann wrote:

Instead of admitting that some traditional beliefs are comforting, James argued that "the risk of being in error is a very small matter when compared with the blessing of real knowledge", and implied that those who did not accept religious beliefs were cowards, afraid of risking anything: "It is like a general informing soldiers that it is better to keep out of battle forever than to risk a single wound" (Section VII). James' appeal depends entirely on blurring the distinction between those who hold out for 100 percent proof in a matter in which any reasonable person rests content with, let us say, 90 percent, and those who refuse to indulge in a belief which is supported only by the argument that after all it could conceivably be true.

== See also ==
- American philosophy
- Fideism
- Pascal's wager
- Pragmatism
- Prudentialism
