= Free Thought and Official Propaganda =

1922 speech and publication by Bertrand Russell

- Author: Bertrand Russell
- Language: English
- Subject: Political philosophy
- Publication date: 1922
- Publication place: United Kingdom

"Free Thought and Official Propaganda" is a speech (and subsequent publication) delivered in 1922 by Bertrand Russell on the importance of unrestricted freedom of expression in society, and the problem of the state and political class interfering in this through control of education, fines, economic leverage, and distortion of evidence.

== Freedom of speech ==
Russell starts out by describing the more common use of the term "free thought" to mean that one does not accept unquestioning belief in the popular religion of a region, or ideally of any religion at all. However, he goes on to say that a more important and global kind of free thought is the freedom of pressure to believe any specific ideas, that one be allowed to have and express any opinion without penalty.

He notes that this is not allowed in any country at all, with the possible exception of the (pre-communist) Republic of China. One could not, for example, immigrate to the US without swearing they are not an anarchist or polygamous, and once inside must not be communist. In Great Britain, he must not express disbelief in Christianity, in Japan of Shinto.

Russell notes that countries like these may think of themselves as having freedom of expression, but that some ideas are so obviously "monstrous and immoral" that such tolerance does not apply to them. However, he points out, this is exactly the same view that allowed torture during the Inquisition, that all ideas must be allowed to be expressed, no matter how obviously bad.

Next, Russell describes incidents in his own life that illustrate the lack of freedom of thought:

1. His father was a Free Thinker (agnostic or atheist), who arranged for three-year-old Bertrand to be raised as a free thinker when he was dying, but the courts overrode this and forced him to be raised Christian.
2. In 1910, Russell failed to receive Liberal Party nomination for Parliament when the party's inner circle had learned he was agnostic.
3. When he became a lecturer at Trinity College, Russell was not allowed to become a Fellow (like having tenure) because the establishment of the college didn't want to add an "anti-clerical" vote to the college government. When Russell subsequently expressed opposition to World War I, he was fired.

This repression by the political class, Russell notes, is not limited to religion. Believers in free love or communism are treated even worse.

== Will to doubt ==
What we need is not the will to believe, but the wish to find out.

Next, Bertrand Russell describes importance of the will to doubt. In 1896, American philosopher William James had written about the will to believe, and Russell uses this as a foil to express his own opposite position. James claimed that even without (or with conflicting) evidence, one might still simply choose to believe in a thing—he cites Christianity—simply because one thinks the belief has beneficial outcomes.

Russell, along with Alfred Henry Lloyd and others, responds to this by describing the will to doubt, the choice to remain skeptical because it is the more logical, rational position that will lead to understanding more truth, while a "will to believe" will inevitably bind one into untruths in some way. "None of our beliefs are quite true; all have at least a penumbra of vagueness and error. The methods of increasing the degree of truth in our beliefs are well known; they consist in hearing all sides, trying to ascertain all the relevant facts, controlling our own bias by discussion with people who have the opposite bias, and cultivating a readiness to discard any hypothesis which has proved inadequate."

As an example of the benefits of this kind of actual skepticism, Russell describe's Albert Einstein's overturning of the conventional wisdom of physics at that time, comparing it to Darwin contradicting Biblical literalists of the previous century.

What, Bertrand asks, if instead of overturning physics, Einstein had proposed something equally new in the sphere of religion or politics?

English people would have found elements of Prussianism in his theory; anti-Semites would have regarded it as a Zionist plot; nationalists in all countries would have found it tainted with lily-livered pacifism, and proclaimed it a mere dodge for escaping military service. All the old-fashioned professors would have approached Scotland Yard to get the importation of his writings prohibited. Teachers favourable to him would have been dismissed. He, meantime, would have captured the Government of some backward country, where it would have become illegal to teach anything except his doctrine, which would have grown into a mysterious dogma not understood by anybody. Ultimately the truth or falsehood of his doctrine would be decided on the battlefield, without the collection of any fresh evidence for or against it. This method is the logical outcome of William James's will to believe.
What is wanted is not the will to believe, but the wish to find out, which is its exact opposite.

Assuming that the need for rational doubt or fallibilism is understood to be important, Russell then goes on to address the question of why irrational certainty is so common. He says this is largely because of three factors.

- Education — Instead of public education being used to teach children healthy learning attitudes, they are used for the opposite, to indoctrinate children with dogma, often patently false, even known to be false by the officials imposing the education.
- Propaganda — After being taught to read but not weigh evidence and form original opinions, children become adults who are then subjected to dubious or obviously false claims for the rest of their lives.
- Economic pressure — The State and political class will use its control of finances and economy to impose its ideas, by restricting the choices of those who disagree.
