= The Varieties of Religious Experience =

1902 book by William James

The Varieties of Religious Experience: A Study in Human Nature
- Author: William James
- Original title: The Varieties of Religious Experience: A Study in Human Nature, Being the Gifford Lectures on Natural Religion Delivered at Edinburgh in 1901–1902
- Language: English
- Subjects: Philosophy of religion Psychology of religion
- Publisher: Longmans, Green & Co.
- Publication date: 1902
- Publication place: United States
- Media type: Print
- Pages: 534
- LC Class: BR110.J3 1902a
- Followed by: Pragmatism: A New Name for Some Old Ways of Thinking (1907)
- Text: The Varieties of Religious Experience: A Study in Human Nature at Wikisource

The Varieties of Religious Experience: A Study in Human Nature is a book by Harvard University psychologist and philosopher William James. It comprises his edited Gifford Lectures on natural theology, which were delivered at the University of Edinburgh, Scotland, between 1901 and 1902. The lectures concerned the psychological study of individual private religious experiences and mysticism, and used a range of examples to identify commonalities in religious experiences across traditions.

Soon after its publication, Varieties entered the Western canon of psychology and philosophy and has remained in print for over a century.

James later developed his philosophy of pragmatism. There are many overlapping ideas in Varieties and his 1907 book Pragmatism.

== Historical context ==
=== Psychology of religion ===
In the 1890s, a "new psychology" emerged in European and American universities which coincided with the establishment of many new psychology laboratories and the appointment of faculty in psychology. New psychology's novelty was encapsulated by its distinction from philosophy (philosophy of mind in particular) and theology, and its emphasis on the laboratory-based experimental method. As part of this development, the psychology of religion emerged as a new approach to studying religious experience, with the US being the major centre of research in this field.

A few years earlier Edwin Diller Starbuck had written a book entitled Psychology of Religion which James had written a preface to. James thanks Starbuck in the preface to his book for having "made over to me his large collection of manuscript material" before then citing Starbuck's work throughout The Varieties. Starbuck recollects that James looked through "several hundred" of his documents.

The Varieties was first presented in 1901-2 as a set of twenty Gifford lectures at the University of Edinburgh. This was a lecture series instituted by Adam Gifford and intended to have a popular and public audience on the subject of natural theology, or scientific approaches to the study of religion. James had originally planned for the second half of his lectures to be a philosophical assessment of religion but ill health meant that he could only write one lecture on the topic, resulting in a work more descriptive than James had initially anticipated.

== Themes ==
=== Religious experiences ===
In the Varieties, James explicitly excludes from his study both theology and religious institutions, choosing to limit his study to direct and immediate religious experiences, which he regarded as the more interesting object of study. Churches, theologies, and institutions are important as vehicles for passing on insights gained by religious experience but, in James's view, they live second-hand off the original experience of the founder. A key distinction in James's treatment of religion is between that of healthy-minded religion and religion of the sick soul; the former is a religion of life's goodness, while the latter cannot overcome the sense of evil in the world. Although James presents this as a value-neutral distinction between different kinds of religious attitudes, he, in fact, regarded the sick-souled religious experience as preferable, and his anonymous source of melancholy experience in lectures VI and VII is, in fact, autobiographical. Following these autobiographical sections, James transitions into two lectures (IX and X) examining religious conversion from a psychological point-of-view, along with its importance in religious history. James considered healthy-mindedness to be America's main contribution to religion, which he saw running from the transcendentalists Ralph Waldo Emerson and Walt Whitman to Mary Baker Eddy's Christian Science. At the extreme, the "healthy-minded" see sickness and evil as an illusion. James considered belief in the "mind cure" to be reasonable when compared to medicine as practiced at the beginning of the twentieth century.

James devotes two lectures to mysticism, and in the lectures, he outlines four markers common to mystical experiences. These are:

- Ineffability: the experience is incapable of being described, and must be directly experienced to be understood.
- Noesis: the experience is understood to be a state of knowledge through which divine truths can be learned.
- Transience: the experience is of limited duration.
- Passivity: the subject of the experience is passive, unable to control the arrival and departure of the experience.

He believed that religious experiences can have "morbid origins" in brain pathology and can be irrational, but nevertheless largely positive. Unlike the bad ideas that people have under the influence of, say, fevers or drunkenness, after a religious experience the ideas and insights usually still make sense to the person, and are often valued for the rest of the person's life.

James had relatively little interest in the legitimacy or illegitimacy of religious experiences. Further, despite James' examples being almost exclusively drawn from Christianity, he did not mean to limit his ideas to any single religion. Religious experiences are something that people sometimes have, under certain conditions. In James' description, these experiences are inherently very complex, often life-altering and largely indescribable and unquantifiable through traditional means, yet measurable in the profound changes they have on the individuals that report such experiences.

=== Pragmatism ===
Ultimately James made a pragmatic argument for religion, writing that "the uses of religion, its uses to the individual who has it, and the uses of the individual himself to the world, are the best arguments that truth is in it". As an example of this he gives the therapeutic effects of prayer.

Although James did not fully articulate his pragmatic philosophy until the publication of Pragmatism in 1907, the approach to religious belief in the Varieties is influenced by pragmatic philosophy. In his Philosophy and Conclusions lectures, James concludes that religion is overall beneficial to humankind, although acknowledges that this does not establish its truth. While James intended to approach the topic of religious experience from this pragmatist angle, Richard Rorty argues that he ultimately deviated from this methodology in the Varieties. In his lectures on saintliness, the intention is to discover whether the saintly virtues are beneficial for human life: if they are, then, according to pragmatism, that supports their claim to truth. However, James ends up concluding that the value of the saintly virtues is dependent on their origin: given that the saintly virtues are only beneficial if there is an afterlife for which they can prepare us, their value depends on whether they are divinely ordained or the result of human psychology. This is no longer a question of value but of empirical fact. Hence, Rorty argues that James ends up abandoning his own pragmatist philosophy due to his ultimate reliance of empirical evidence.

James remarked on the aesthetic motivation in an individual choosing a religion and praised religion for its aesthetic value. He said that individuals "involuntarily intellectualize their religious experience" and that metaphysical stipulations about the attributes of a deity "enriches our bare piety to carry these exalted and mysterious verbal additions just as it enriches a church to have an organ and old brasses, marbles and frescoes and stained windows".

James considers the possibility of "over-beliefs", beliefs which are not strictly justified by "reason valid universally" but which might understandably be held by educated people nonetheless. They are "buildings-out performed by the intellect into directions of which feeling originally supplied the hint". Philosophy may contribute to shaping these over-beliefs—for example, traditional arguments for the existence of God, including the cosmological, design, and moral arguments, along with the argument from popular consensus. Although James did not himself endorse any of these arguments: "The fact is that these arguments do but follow the combined suggestions of the facts and of our feeling. They prove nothing rigorously. They only corroborate our pre-existent partialities". He says that individuals in the past had sought such universal proofs, asking "what more ideal refuge could there be than such a system would offer to spirits vexed by the muddiness and accidentality of the world of sensible things?". James says he has his own over-belief, which he does not intend to prove, that there is a greater reality not normally accessible by our normal ways of relating to the world, but which religious experiences can connect us to.

== Reception and legacy ==
The August 1902 New York Times review of the first edition ends with the following:

Everywhere there is a frolic welcome to the eccentricities and extravagances of the religious life. Many will question whether its more sober exhibitions would not have been more fruitful of results, but the interest and fascination of the treatment are beyond dispute, and so, too, is the sympathy to which nothing human is indifferent.

A July 1963 Time magazine review of an expanded edition published that year ends with quotes about the book from Peirce and Santayana:

He was simply impatient with his fellow academicians and their endless hairsplitting over matters that had no relation to life. A vibrant, generous person, he hoped to show that religious emotions, even those of the deranged, were crucial to human life. The great virtue of The Varieties, noted pragmatist philosopher Charles Peirce, is its "penetration into the hearts of people." Its great weakness, retorted George Santayana, is its "tendency to disintegrate the idea of truth, to recommend belief without reason and to encourage superstition."

In 1913 Josiah Royce wrote a paper on George Fox which he described as "a fragmentary contribution to that study of the "Varieties of Religious Experience" which William James has so significantly brought to the attention of students of human nature". Royce described James' book as one which "with all its wealth of illustration, and in its courageous enterprise, has a certain classic beauty". He further considered the book to be reflective of "the manifoldness and of the breadth of the general psychological movement itself".

In 1986, Nicholas Lash criticised James's Varieties, challenging James's separation of the personal and institutional. Lash argues that religious geniuses such as St. Paul or Jesus, with whom James was particularly interested, did not have their religious experiences in isolation but within and influenced by a social and historical context. Ultimately, Lash argues that this comes from James's failure to overcome Cartesian dualism in his thought: while James believed he had succeeded in surpassing Descartes, he was still tied to a notion of an internal ego, distinct from the body or outside world, which undergoes experiences.

The book was cherished by Ludwig Wittgenstein who wrote to Bertrand Russell that "Whenever I have time now I read James’ Varieties of Religious Exp[erience]. This book does me a lot of good". It was one of the few books he recommended to his friend Maurice O'Connor Drury. The influence of James' book is seen from letters sent to him from his sister Hermione as he was serving at the front during World War 1. She was concerned about his well-being and wrote to him that "there will be time for you to be a Jamesian type after the war is over!". Brian McGuinness writes that Wittgenstein aspired to be the 'saintly' type described in the book.

In more recent years the book has continued to be positively reviewed. In 1951 William A. Christian called the book "still one of the best books on the psychological variables in the domain of religion" and in 1995 Stephen H. Webb remarked that "James is perhaps most read today for his sensitive descriptions of the bewildering diversity of religious forms".

The book has been described as philosophical, as opposed to merely psychological. Michael Hodges writes that James's book is "addressed to a philosophical audience" and in 1979 Gary T. Alexander wrote that the book is "seldom used in any substantive manner by current psychologists of religion, who, although often lauding the work as a creation of genius, tend to view it as primarily philosophical in nature".

== See also ==
- Cosmic Consciousness
- Fideism
- Mysticism
- Religious experience
