= Essays in Radical Empiricism =

By William James for his students

Essays in Radical Empiricism (ERE) by William James is a collection edited and published posthumously by his colleague and biographer Ralph Barton Perry in 1912. It was assembled from ten out of a collection of twelve reprinted journal articles published from 1904–1905 which James had deposited in August, 1906, at the Harvard University Library and the Harvard Department of Philosophy for supplemental use by his students. Perry replaced two essays from the original list with two others, one of which didn't exist at the earlier time.

Because ERE is a collection of essays written over a period of time, and ultimately not selected or collated by their author, it is not a systematic exposition of his thought even though Perry suggests otherwise in his preface. This circumstance, in addition to the evolution of James own philosophic stance, has contributed to a wide variance in understanding, misunderstanding, and critical opinion of radical empiricism.

== History ==
=== Unpublished 1906 collection ===
This is the original collection of articles deposited by James (as bound by Harvard about 1912), with dates of journal publication:

1. "Does Consciousness Exist?" (September 1904)
2. "La Notion de Conscience" (French language, June, 1905)
3. "A World of Pure Experience" (Sept–October, 1904)
4. "The Pragmatic Method" (December, 1904)
5. "The Thing and Its Relations" (January, 1905)
6. "The Essence of Humanism" (March, 1905)
7. "How Two Minds Can Know One Thing" (March, 1905)
8. "Is Radical Empiricism Solipsistic?" (April, 1905)
9. "The Place of Affectional Facts in a World of Pure Experience" (May, 1905)
10. "The Experience of Activity" (January, 1905)
11. "Humanism and Truth" (October, 1904)
12. "Humanism and Truth Once More" (April, 1905)

=== James' 1907 list ===
In mid-1907 James composed a list of 15 essays for an anticipated book titled "Essays in Radical Empiricism". Two of the essays in the 1906 collection are not present on this list. "The Pragmatic Method" had been adapted as chapter three for James' book Pragmatism. "Humanism and Truth Once More" was combined with "Humanism and Truth" in the 1909 book The Meaning of Truth (MT).

James' plans for a book on radical empiricism based on this list never came to fruition. Pragmatism was published in June 1907 and was well received. In the spring of 1909 James began to assemble material for a follow-up book called The Meaning of Truth. His 1907 list fell victim to the needs of the immediate book. The two strikeout lines were made by James on his actual list. The notes to the right of the titles have been added to clarify how the essays were later used.

1. "The Function of Cognition" (1885) → MT
2. "The Knowing of Things Together" (1895) → extracted "The Tigers in India" → MT
3. "Does Consciousness Exist?"
4. "A World of Pure Experience" → extracted "The Relation Between Knower and Known" → MT
5. "La Notion de Conscience"
6. "The Essence of Humanism" → MT
7. "How Two Minds Can Know One Thing"
8. "Is Radical Empiricism Solipsistic?
9. "The Place of Affectional Facts in a World of Pure Experience"
10. "Humanism and Truth" → plus excerpt of "Humanism and Truth Once More" → MT
11. ~~"The Thing and Its Relations"~~ published 1909 as Appendix A, A Pluralistic Universe (PLU)
12. "Controversy About Truth" (1907)
13. "One Word More About Truth" (1907) → MT
14. "Pratt On Truth" (1907) → MT
15. ~~"The Experience of Activity"~~ published 1909 as Appendix B, PLU

=== Perry's 1912 book ===
After James' death, Ralph Perry thought it appropriate to assemble a book on radical empiricism, and mined the earlier lists to come up with this one:

1. "Does Consciousness Exist?"
2. "A World of Pure Experience"
3. "The Thing and Its Relations"
4. "How Two Minds Can Know One Thing"
5. "The Place of Affectional Facts in a World of Pure Experience"
6. "The Experience of Activity"
7. "The Essence of Humanism"
8. "La Notion de Conscience"
9. "Is Radical Empiricism Solipsistic?
10. "Mr. Pitkin's Refutation of Radical Empiricism" (1906, Perry addition)
  1. "A Reply to Mr. Pitkin" (1907)
11. "Humanism and Truth Once More"
12. "Absolutism and Empiricism" (1884, Perry addition)

Harvard added one more article, "Controversy About Truth", from James' 1907 list to its 1976 critical edition.

== Editions ==
- Essays in Radical Empiricism (1912). Dover Publications 2003, ISBN 0-486-43094-4
- The Works of William James: Essays in Radical Empiricism. Frederick Burkhardt and Fredson Bowers, editors. Harvard University Press 1976: ISBN 0-674-26717-6 (critical edition includes commentary, notes, enumerated emendations, appendices with English translation of "La Notion de Conscience")
- William James: Writings 1902-1910, (1987). Library of America, 1379 p., ISBN 0-940450-38-0

containing: The Varieties of Religious Experience, Pragmatism, A Pluralistic Universe, The Meaning of Truth, Some Problems of Philosophy, Essays
This alternate source separately contains nine of Perry's twelve ERE selections (counting the ones in A Pluralistic Universe and Meaning of Truth), lacking only "La Notion de Conscience", "Mr. Pitkin's Refutation..", and "Absolutism and Empiricism". The text is based on James' corrected copies of the journal articles rather than the ERE text.
