= Edwin Diller Starbuck =

American educational psychologist

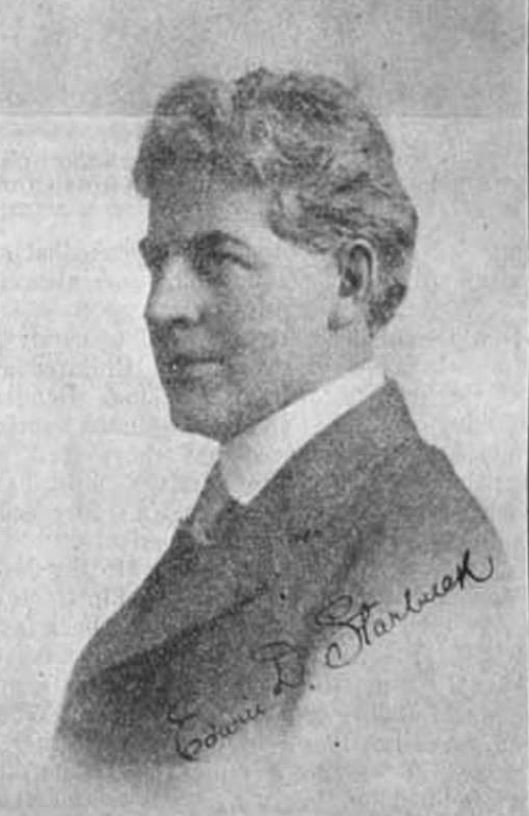
c. 1926

Edwin Diller Starbuck born Edwin Eli Starbuck (20 February 1866 – 18 November 1947) was an American educational psychologist who took a special interest in the teaching of morals and character in children independent of religious instruction. His idea was to imbue morals through indirect means where students would learn by inference. He is considered a pioneer in the field of the psychology of religion with his book Psychology of Religion (1899) being the first in the genre.

== Life ==
Starbuck was the son of Luzena Jessup and Samuel, Quaker farmers in Guilford Township, Hendricks County, Indiana. He grew up skeptical of orthodox Christian beliefs and took an early interest in evolution. He graduated in philosophy at Indiana University in 1890 and joined Harvard to study philosophy, religion and psychology, receiving a degree in 1895. He conducted surveys of religious belief and conversion using questionnaires along with G. Stanley Hall at Clark University and published several papers of his findings. He later published the book Psychology of Religion (1899) and also contributed to the work of William James' Varieties of Religious Experience (1902). James contributed a preface to Starbuck's own book and cited him a number of times in Varieties. He also thanked him in the preface for having "made over to me his large collection of manuscript material". Starbuck recollects that James looked through "several hundred" of his documents.

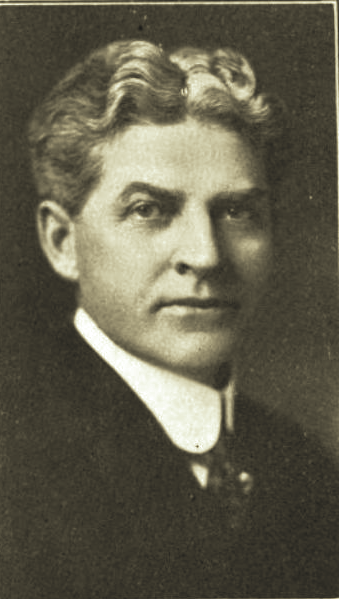
1913

He became an assistant professor of education at Leland Stanford Junior University. In 1903 he worked with Ernst Meumann at the University of Zurich. He worked in Earlham College from 1904 to 1906 before he moved to the University of Iowa. He moved to the University of Southern California in 1930 and remained there until his retirement. He pioneered the empirical study of religion through questionnaire surveys.

He married Anna Maria Diller, a Harvard classmate, in 1895 and they had eight children. He later changed his middle name to Diller.

== Bibliography ==
=== Books ===
- The Psychology of Religion (1899)
- Familiar Haunts: Fairy Tales (selected by Starbuck, 1930)
- Far Horizons (selected by Starbuck and Shuttleworth, Frank K., 1930)

=== Articles and essays ===
- A Study of Conversion in The American Journal of Psychology, Vol. 8, No. 2 (Jan., 1897), pp. 268–308
- Contributions to the Psychology of Religion in The American Journal of Psychology, Vol. 9, No. 1 (Oct., 1897), pp. 70–124
- The Scientific Study of Religion in Homiletic Review, Vol. 49 (1903)
- The Religion of a Mature Mind in The Biblical World, Vol. 23, No. 2 (Feb., 1904), pp. 123–129
- The Feelings and their Place in Religion in The American Journal of Religious Psychology and Education, Vol. 1 (1904), pp. 183–185
- The Child-Mind and the Child-Religion in The Biblical World (Vol. 1, Vol.2, Vol. 3, Vol. 4, 1907, Vol. 5, 1908, Vol. 6, 1909)
- Reinforcement to the Pulpit from Modern Psychology: IV. As a Man Thinketh in His Heart in Homiletic Review, Vol. 54 (January 1908)
- The Intimate Senses as Sources of Wisdom in The Journal of Religion, Vol. 1, No. 2 (Mar., 1921), pp. 129–145
- Life and Confessions of G. Stanley Hall: Some Notes on the Psychology of Genius in The Journal of Philosophy, Vol. 21, No. 6 (Mar. 13, 1924), pp. 141–154
- Studies in Character at the University of Iowa in The Phi Delta Kappan, Vol. 9, No. 5 (Apr., 1927), pp. 135–136
- Religion's Use of Me in Religion in Transition, edited by Vergilius Ferm (1937)
