= Damasio =

Damasio is a surname. Notable persons with that name include:

- Alain Damasio (born 1969), French sci-fi and fantasy writer
- Antonio Damasio (born 1944), Portuguese-American neuroscientist
- Éldis Fernando Damasio (born 1981), Brazilian footballer
- Hanna Damasio, Portuguese-American neuroscientist
- Jairon Feliciano Damasio (born 1981), Brazilian footballer
- Matias Damásio (born 1982), Angolan singer
