= Alice Crocker Lloyd =

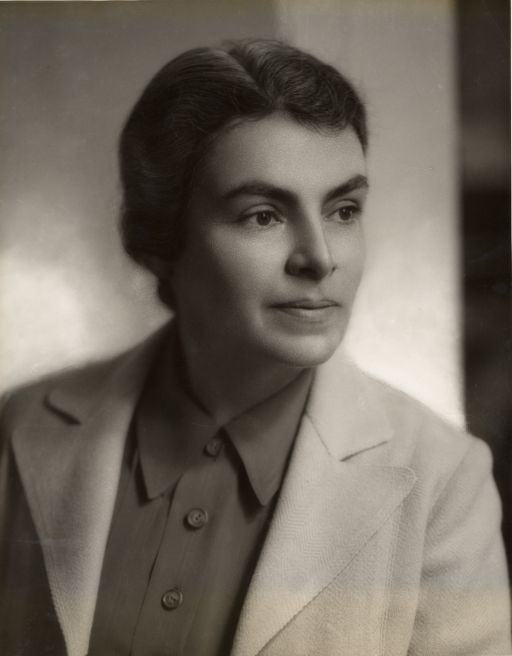
- Portrait of Alice Lloyd, Dean of Women, University of Michigan, Bentley Historical Library

Dean of Women University of Michigan
- In office 1930–1950

Personal details
- Born: December 9, 1893 Ann Arbor, Michigan
- Died: March 3, 1950 (aged 56) Ann Arbor, Michigan
- Education: University of Michigan
- Profession: Nurse, Probation Officer

Alice Crocker Lloyd (December 9, 1893 – March 3, 1950) was the University of Michigan's longest serving Dean of Women, and is widely regarded as a trailblazer in progressive educational programs and for the ideals of young women at the time. Lloyd worked during a period of expanding opportunities for women at the University of Michigan, as the institution developed new residence halls, advising systems, and academic programs to support its growing female student population.

== Early life and education ==
Lloyd was born on December 9, 1893, in Ann Arbor, Michigan. She was the first child of Alfred H. Lloyd and Margaret Crocker Lloyd. Her father was the former dean of the University of Michigan's graduate school, a former professor of philosophy, and also served as acting president of the University in 1925. She grew up on the outskirts of Ann Arbor and attended the now-defunct Ann Arbor High and later Milton Academy in Milton, MA. She had a sister, Anna, and two brothers Frederick and Putnam. Frederick T. Lloyd fought in World War I and suffered from PTSD after his return home. He spent the rest of his life in a Battle Creek veteran's hospital. Putnam became a doctor and moved to New York. Lloyd is a descendant through her mother's side of John Putnam, a prominent early settler in Salem, MA.

During the summer, the Lloyds would go to Piseco, New York in the Adirondacks where the family enjoyed outdoor activities. As a student, she was described as being serious and successful, although she enjoyed collecting poems.

Lloyd attended the University of Michigan and graduated in 1916. During her undergraduate years, she participated in theater and choir. She was elected to the soloist position at Ann Arbor's local Episcopal Church. Due to the outbreak of World War I, post-graduation, Lloyd stayed close to home and taught at her own small school for two years. In 1918, she began training to become a nurse at the Luke's Hospital Training School of Nurses in New York City, and earned her R.N. certificate in 1921. She subsequently worked as a probation officer with juvenile delinquent girls in Wayne County, Detroit. She was offered a position in 1926 as an Adviser of Women's Studies at the University of Michigan, which led to her becoming Dean of Women in 1930. The early generations of women at the University of Michigan faced limited institutional support and gender-specific barriers, shaping the academic environment inherited by Lloyd and informing her later work in women’s student services.

== Dean of women ==
Lloyd oversaw the construction of two women's residence halls: Stockwell and Mosher – Jordan. She also was beneficial in the planning of the dormitory that would eventually bear her name. Supportive programs for the female students were also important to her. The Women's Athletic Building was one of several programs that advanced the quality of life for these undergraduate women due to her efforts. Her role as Dean of Women included oversight of housing, student advising, discipline, and co-curricular programming, responsibilities that defined the position at many coeducational universities during this period. She was committed to the Michigan League, which was newly completed when she began her term as Dean. It went on to become a headquarters for activities of women students as well as for alumnae. As women’s enrollment expanded in the early twentieth century, university administrators increasingly relied on the Dean of Women to coordinate advising, residence oversight, and student welfare; roles that reflected broader efforts at Michigan to support a more diverse and growing female student population.

This was a pivotal time for women in higher education, particularly at Michigan. Lloyd dealt with changes in social attitudes and requirements, such as women's hours and overcrowding in housing. She wrote editorials in the Daily, attempting to bridge the gap between faculty and students. This was frequently a sore spot due to the shifting position of the idea of in loco parentis, which was causing an irritation amongst the student body especially in regard to the strict curfew hours women students were living under. Additionally, the lack of student housing for growing numbers of women students was becoming a larger problem each year. Lloyd’s administrative approach reflected a broader shift in women’s leadership roles in higher education, as deans of women increasingly developed professionalized responsibilities related to student welfare, academic support, and campus governance. Women students in early coeducational institutions often relied on administrators such as Lloyd for academic guidance, welfare advocacy, and personal support, due to university structures that were originally designed around the needs of male students.

Lloyd was not a champion for Greek Life sororities, which had become popular at the time she became Dean. She believed the university had become a place where social life mattered more than the academics. During this time, it was beginning to be felt that the experience outside of the classroom was just as important as the academics. Despite her attitude that school should be a place for learning, away from social distractions, Lloyd still maintained an idealistic view on the world and education. In a speech given to the National Association of Deans of Women from January, 1944 she stated, "Education must be inspired by courageous and spiritual leadership and must touch the hearts of people as well as train their minds." In another speech given at the American Legion Auxiliary Services on August 16, 1945, she said, "It is through generosity and compassion and honesty and love that we will build a new world.".

Lloyd was often at odds with an administration that she felt was still stuck in the past and grappled with the need for more authority in her position as Dean of Women. In a letter to Provost James P. Adams on October 20, 1945, she expressed her displeasure with the "relationship" between the Dean of Women and the women's residence halls stating:

"I feel very keenly that the direction of the educational program, i.e. language tables, forums, etc., the social program, the student government organization, and the supervision and choice of the personnel dealing directly with the students (the house directors and new assistants) should be the responsibility of the Dean of Women."

Relationship with Greek Life

Despite her displeasure towards the institution itself, Lloyd would frequently insert herself into the politics of the Greek System at the school. At times she saw it as beneficial to student life since it provided student housing and a place to engage in structured activities outside of the classroom. She was vocal about her beliefs and regularly at Pan-hellenic meetings. These speeches focused on her academic ideals:

"It is my belief that social organisations such as sororities and fraternities should choose their members solely on a basis of character, integrity, and personality without regard to race or nationality or religious creed."

and

"To stress their value as house-clubs is to bring them into direct competition with the dormitories which in many instances now offer better living conditions. To emphasize the social life they offer is to bring very forcibly to light the fact that the social situation has changed from the earlier intimate group life within the sorority house to the present-day social activities outside the house. Both these factors have weakened their position. What will strengthen it?"

== Personal life and accomplishments ==
Lloyd was the godmother to many of her friends' children and took great interest in her pupils. It is widely agreed that she was both a confidante and advisor to her students, but also cautioned against what she believed to be the unintended consequences of a college-centric social life.

Lloyd was also active outside the University, and was a prominent figure in the Ann Arbor community. She was a member of the Episcopal Church in Ann Arbor, serving as the Chairman of the Music Committee and was also a member of the Ann Arbor Dramatic Season Chamber of Commerce in Ann Arbor where she would serve on the executive committee from 1937 to 1942. Her shared home with her mother and aunt became a gathering space for artists and performers. In 1936, she served as a member on the Board of Directors for Cranbrook Kingswood School. She became a member of the Democratic Party as well as being a member of the National Association of Deans of Women, the American Association of University Women, Phi Beta Kappa, and Phi Kappa Phi. and serving on the committees for the American Council on Education. She was president of the Association of Deans of Women from 1941 to 1943.

=== Commitment to nursing and war efforts ===
Lloyd was involved in the war efforts during WWII. She was appointed to the State's Advisory committee for the Women's Army Corps and to two national committees for the U.S. Navy: the special committee on college women students and the war, and the advisory education council on women's services. She was awarded the Navy's certificate of recognition.

She also often spoke to nursing students about their duties not only to the country and soldiers under their care, but to themselves. In a speech given to nursing students she remarked:

"It is important that you have outside interests, but it is even more important that you have great interest in your profession, that you see it on the high plane where it belongs in order that you may have pride in it. I am interested in education because it is the only hope in a democratic country like ours. The striving of man for an education is an effort on his part to understand better the universe in which he lives."

== Death and legacy ==
Lloyd died at her home at the age of 56 on March 3, 1950, after suffering from a long-term illness. She was survived by her mother, sister and two brothers.

Many people dedicated their time to creating memorials and funds in Lloyd's name after her death. Narratives preserved in university archives highlight how women students frequently depended on administrators such as Lloyd for guidance, advocacy, and community during periods when coeducational institutions were still adapting to women’s needs. Alice Lloyd Hall at the University of Michigan was named in recognition of her contributions to women’s student life, and the hall’s emphasis on community and academic engagement reflects values associated with her leadership. The university’s “Living in History” project highlights Lloyd’s influence on the development of women’s educational opportunities and documents her commemoration through campus buildings.

Mary T. Bromage spent significant time on a biography of Lloyd to be included in A Biographical Dictionary.
