= Buytendijk =

Buytendijk is a surname. Notable people with the surname include:

- Frank Buytendijk (born 1969), Dutch author
- Frederik Jacobus Johannes Buytendijk (1887–1974), Dutch anthropologist, biologist, and psychologist
