= Joachim Fischer (sociologist) =

German sociologist

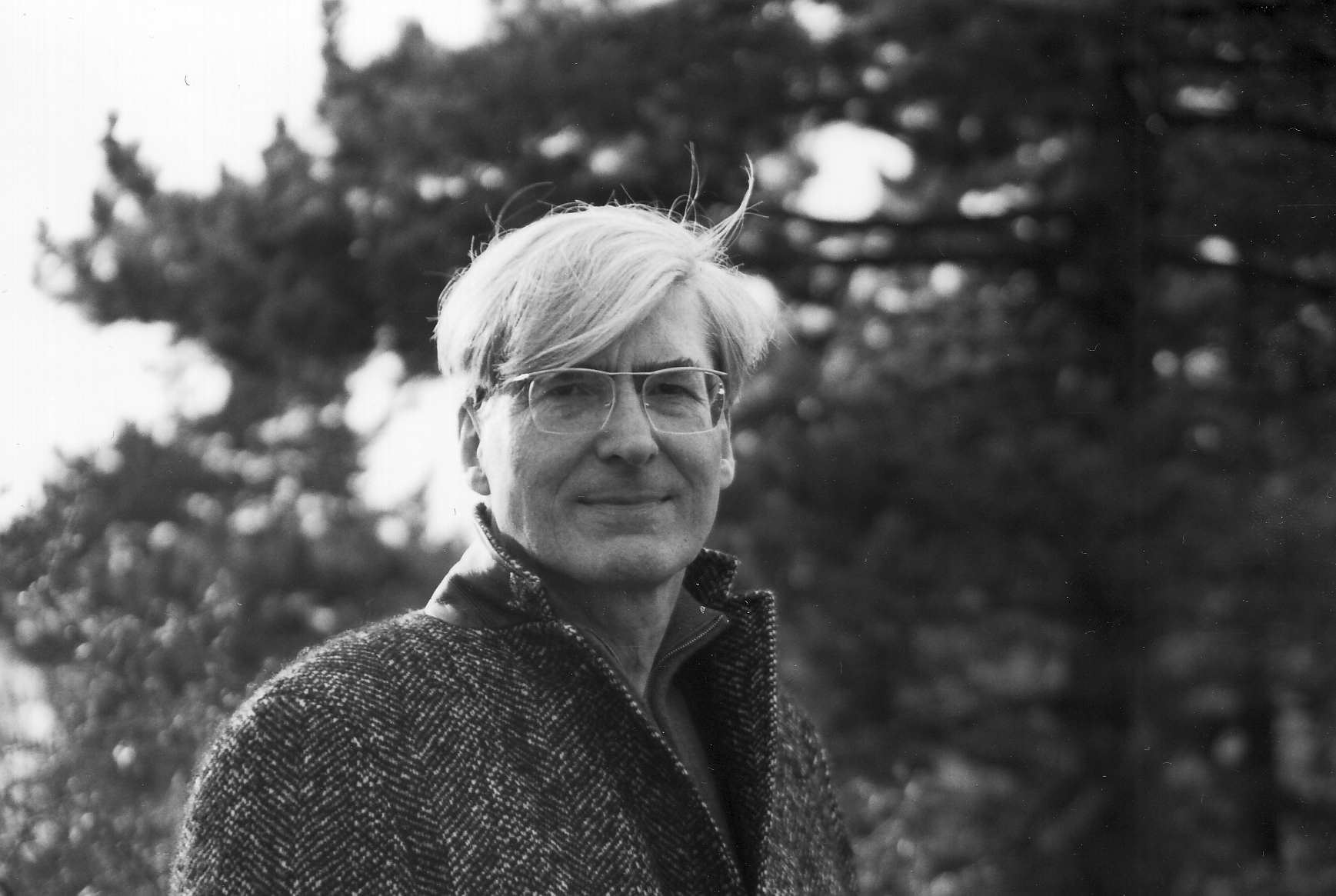

Joachim Fischer (born 1951 in Hanover) is a German sociologist and social theorist. His reference book on Philosophical anthropology has become the standard reference for the field. From 2011 to 2017, he was president of the Helmuth Plessner Society.

The focus of his work lies in the areas of philosophical anthropology, sociological theory, culture sociology and sociology of architecture. In 2010, he became an honorary professor at the Philosophical Faculty of the Dresden University of Technology. In the summer semester of 2012 he was a visiting professor at the University Viadrina of Frankfurt (Oder) (Sociology / Sociological Theory).

Fischer´s work has focused on reconstructing the paradigm of modern European Philosophical anthropology (Max Scheler, Helmuth Plessner, Erich Rothacker, Arnold Gehlen, Adolf Portmann) in the 20th century, explicating its significance for biological, sociological and philosophical debates in the 21st century. As a theoretical background of the modern Philosophical anthropology he researches the Critical ontology of the German philosopher Nicolai Hartmann.

In a series of essays in social ontology he too developed - with reference to Simmel and Freud - a systematic consideration on the figure of the Third or Tertiarity. Triads (sociology) seem for intersubjective relationships and institutions to be just as well constitutive than the Dyad (sociology) or the Other (Alterity).

== Writings ==
- Tertiarität. Studien zur Sozialontologie, Weilerswist 2022, ISBN 978-3-95832-158-8.
- Exentrische Positionalität. Studien zu Helmuth Plessner, Weilerswist 2016, ISBN 978-3-95832-093-2.
- Philosophische Anthropologie. Eine Denkrichtung des 20. Jahrhunderts, Freiburg/München: Alber Verlag 2008.
- Exploring the Core Identity of Philosophical Anthropology through the Works of Max Scheler, Helmuth Plessner and Arnold Gehlen, in: Iris. European Journal of Philosophy and Public Debate, Florence University Press, Vol. I, 1 ("Critical Points: Philosophical Anthropology and Contemporary German Thought" (2009), pp. 153–170.
- Turn to the Third. A Systematic Consideration of an Innovation in Social Theory, in: Bernhard Malkmus / Ian Cooper (Eds), Dialektic and Paradox: Configurations of the Third in Modernity, Oxford 2013, pp. 81–102.
- Sociology in Germany (1949 to the present), In: Alexandros Kyrtsis/Sokratis Koniordes (eds.), Routledge Handbook of European Sociology, Routledge, 2014, pp. 342–356.
- Philosophical Anthropology. A Third Way between Darwinism and Foucaultism, in: Jos de Mul (ed.): Plessner’s Philosophical Anthropology. Perspectives and Prospects. Amsterdam University Press (AUP) 2014, pp. 41–56.
- Nicolai Hartmann: A Crucial Figure in German Philosophical Anthropology - Without belonging to the Paradigm, in: Roberto Poli / Carlo Scognamiglio / Frederic Tremblay (Eds.), The Philosophy of Nicolai Hartmann, Berlin/Boston 2011, pp. 73–94.
- The Notes of Hartmann’s Disputations 1920-1950: A Finding in Philosophical History, in: Horizon. Studies in Phenomenology, Vol. 8, N. 1 2019, pp. 11–16.
- „Man in the Age of Adjustment“. Scheler‘s Theory of Modernity as the Age of Heterogeneous Sociocultural Differentations, in: Christopher Gutland / Xiaogang Yang / Wei Zhang (Hg.): Scheler und das asiatische Denken im Weltalter des Ausgleichs (Scheleriana 6), Nordhausen 2019, pp. 315–325.
