= Robert Morrison MacIver =

Scottish sociologist

Robert M. MacIver
- Born: 17 April 1882; Stornoway, Isle of Lewis, Scotland
- Died: 15 June 1970 (aged 88); New York City, US
- Occupations: Sociologist, political scientist
- Spouse: Elizabeth Marion Peterkin (m. 1911)

Education
- Education: University of Edinburgh; University of Oxford; Columbia University

Robert Morrison MacIver (April 17, 1882 – June 15, 1970) was a sociologist and political scientist.

== Early life and family ==
Robert Morrison MacIver was born in Stornoway, Isle of Lewis, Scotland on April 17, 1882, to Donald MacIver, a general merchant and tweed manufacturer, and Christina MacIver (née Morrison). His father was a Calvinist, specifically, Scottish Presbyterian. On 14 August 1911, he married Elizabeth Marion Peterkin. They had three children: Ian Tennant Morrison, Christina Elizabeth, and Donald Gordon.

== Education ==
He received degrees from the University of Edinburgh (M.A. 1903; D.Ph. 1915), the University of Oxford (B.A. 1907), Columbia University (Litt.E. 1929), and Harvard (1936). In his rather long period of formal education, he had never made any academically supervised study of sociology. His work in that field was distinguished by his acumen, his philosophical understanding, and extensive study of the major pioneering works of Durkheim, Levy-Bruhl, Simmel and others in the British Museum Library in London, while resident as a student in Oxford.

== Career ==
He was a university lecturer in Political Science (1907) and sociology (1911) at the University of Aberdeen. He left Aberdeen in 1915 for a post at the University of Toronto where he was a Professor of Political Science and later became the Head of department from 1922 to 1927. MacIver was vice chairman of the Canada War Labor Board from 1917 to 1918. In 1927, he accepted an invitation from Barnard College of Columbia University in New York City, where he became professor of Social Science from 1927 to 1936. He was subsequently named Lieber Professor of Political Science and Sociology at Columbia University and taught there from 1929 to 1950. He was the president of The New School for Social Research from 1963 until 1965. During these years, he was the founder of the School's Center for New York City Affairs. He became chancellor in 1966.

He was a Fellow of the Royal Society of Canada, the American Academy of Arts and Sciences, and the American Philosophical Society. He was a member of the American Sociological Society, and was elected as its 30th President in 1940. He was a member of the Institut International de Sociologie and of Phi Beta Kappa.

== Activism ==
In the 1950s, MacIver was activist at Boris Gourevitch's the Union for the Protection of the Human Person. Among its activities, with Albert Simard, in 1955, the three signed a letter addressed to South Africa on equality.

== Bibliography ==
- Community: A Sociological Study, (1917)
- Labor in the Changing World, (1919)
- Elements of Social Science, (1921)
- The Modern State, (1926)
- Relation of Sociology and Social Work, (1931)
- Society 1st Edition (textbook), (1931)
- Economic Reconstruction, (1934)
- Towards an Abiding Peace, (1935)
- Society 2nd Edition (textbook), (1937)
- Leviathan and the People, (1939)
- Social Causation, (1942)
- Foreword to Karl Polanyi's The Great Transformation (1944)
- The Web of Government, (1947)
- The More Perfect Union (1949)
- The Ramparts We Guard (1950)
- The Pursuit of Happiness A Philosophy For Modern Living (1955)
- Society 3rd Edition (textbook), With Charles Page, (1959)
- The Nations and the United Nations (1959)
- Life: Its Dimensions and its Bounds (1960)
- The Challenge of The Passing Years (1962)
- Power Transformed (1964)
- The Prevention and Control of Delinquency (1966)
- As a Tale That Is Told: The Autobiography of R. M. MacIver (1968)

== Sources ==
Entry in: A Dictionary of Sociology, George Marshall (Ed.), 1998, Oxford University Press, ISBN 978-0-19-280081-7 Curriculum vitae provided by MacIver to the General Secretary of the World Council of Churches in 1950, in box 428.11.01.1 of the archives of the World Council of Churches in Geneva, Switzerland (http://library.oikoumene.org/en/home.html)
