= Collective action =

Action taken together by a group of people to further a common objective

Collective action refers to action taken together by a group of people whose goal is to enhance their condition and achieve a common objective. It is a term that has formulations and theories in many areas of the social sciences including psychology, sociology, anthropology, political science and economics.

== The social identity model ==
Researchers Martijn van Zomeren, Tom Postmes, and Russell Spears conducted a meta-analysis of over 180 studies of collective action, in an attempt to integrate three dominant socio-psychological perspectives explaining antecedent conditions to this phenomenon – injustice, efficacy, and identity. In their resultant 2008 review article, an integrative Social Identity Model of Collective Action (SIMCA) was proposed which accounts for interrelationships among the three predictors as well as their predictive capacities for collective action. An important assumption of this approach is that people tend to respond to subjective states of disadvantage, which may or may not flow from objective physical and social reality.

=== Perceived injustice ===
Examining collective action through perceived injustice was initially guided by relative deprivation theory (RDT). RDT focuses on a subjective state of unjust disadvantage, proposing that engaging in fraternal (group-based) social comparisons with others may result in feelings of relative deprivation that foster collective action. Group-based emotions resulting from perceived injustice, such as anger, are thought to motivate collective action in an attempt to rectify the state of unfair deprivation. The extent to which individuals respond to this deprivation involves several different factors and varies from extremely high to extremely low across different settings. Meta-analysis results confirm that effects of injustice causally predict collective action, highlighting the theoretical importance of this variable. Similarly, perceived fairness has also been empirically documented to be a significant predictor of sustained collective action.

=== Perceived efficacy ===
Moving beyond RDT, scholars suggested that in addition to a sense of injustice, people must also have the objective, structural resources necessary to mobilize change through social protest. An important psychological development saw this research instead directed towards subjective expectations and beliefs that unified effort (collective action) is a viable option for achieving group-based goals – this is referred to as perceived collective efficacy. Empirically, collective efficacy is shown to causally affect collective action among a number of populations across varied contexts.

=== Social identity ===
Social identity theory (SIT) suggests that people strive to achieve and maintain positive social identities associated with their group memberships. Where a group membership is disadvantaged (for example, low status), SIT implicates three variables in the evocation of collective action to improve conditions for the group – permeability of group boundaries, legitimacy of the intergroup structures, and the stability of these relationships. For example, when disadvantaged groups perceive intergroup status relationships as illegitimate and unstable, collective action is predicted to occur, in an attempt to change status structures for the betterment of the disadvantaged group.

Meta-analysis results also confirm that social identity causally predicts collective action across a number of diverse contexts. Additionally, the integrated SIMCA affords another important role to social identity – that of a psychological bridge forming the collective base from which both collective efficacy and group injustice may be conceived.

=== Model refinement ===
While there is sound empirical support for the causal importance of SIMCA's key theoretical variables on collective action, more recent literature has addressed the issue of reverse causation, finding support for a related, yet distinct, encapsulation model of social identity in collective action (EMSICA). This model suggests that perceived group efficacy and perceived injustice provide the basis from which social identity emerges, highlighting an alternative causal pathway to collective action. Recent research has sought to integrate SIMCA with intergroup contact theory (see Cakal, Hewstone, Schwär, & Heath) and others have extended SIMCA through bridging morality research with the collective action literature (see van Zomeren, Postmes, & Spears for a review).

Also, utopian thinking has been proposed as an antecendant to collective action, aside to the route affecting perceived injustice, efficacy, or social identity. Utopian thinking contributes to accessing cognitive alternatives, which are imagined models of societies that are different from the current society. Cognitive alternatives are proposed by many social identity theorists as an effective way to increase collective action. Moreover, utopian thinking has the potential to increase perceived injustice, perceived efficacy, or form new social identities and therefore affect collective action.

Furthermore, recent longitudinal studies suggest that the outcomes of collective action can create feedback loops that affect future efficacy and trust. For example, a 2026 study of the 2024 UK General Election found that while collective action is often driven by a desire for change, it can backfire psychologically if the desired outcome is not achieved. Supporters of losing parties who had engaged in high levels of collective action experienced a "dampening" effect on their post-election political trust, hindering the restoration of their faith in the political system compared to those who were less active.

== Public good ==
The economic theory of collective action is concerned with the provision of public goods (and other collective consumption) through the collaboration of two or more individuals, and the impact of externalities on group behavior. It is more commonly referred to as Public Choice. Mancur Olson's 1965 book The Logic of Collective Action: Public Goods and the Theory of Groups, is an important early analysis of the problems of public good cost.

Besides economics, the theory has found many applications in political science, sociology, communication, anthropology and environmentalism.

=== Collective action problem ===
The term collective action problem describes the situation in which multiple individuals would all benefit from a certain action, but has an associated cost making it implausible that any individual can or will undertake and solve it alone. The ideal solution is then to undertake this as a collective action, the cost of which is shared. Situations like this include the prisoner's dilemma, a collective action problem in which no communication is allowed, the free rider problem, and the tragedy of the commons, also known as the problem with open access. An allegorical metaphor often used to describe the problem is "belling the cat".

Solutions to collective action problems include mutually binding agreements, government regulation, privatisation, and assurance contracts, also known as crowdacting.

=== Exploitation of the great by the small ===
Mancur Olson made the claim that individual rational choice leads to situations where individuals with more resources will carry a higher burden in the provision of the public good than poorer ones. Poorer individuals will usually have little choice but to opt for the free rider strategy, i.e., they will attempt to benefit from the public good without contributing to its provision. This may also encourage the under-production (inefficient production) of the public good.

=== Institutional design ===
While public goods are often provided by governments, this is not always the case. Various institutional designs have been studied with the aim of reducing the collaborative failure. The best design for a given situation depends on the production costs, the utility function, and the collaborative effects, amongst other things. Here are only some examples:

==== Joint products ====
A joint-product model analyzes the collaborative effect of joining a private good to a public good. For example, a tax deduction (private good) can be tied to a donation to a charity (public good).

It can be shown that the provision of the public good increases when tied to the private good, as long as the private good is provided by a monopoly (otherwise the private good would be provided by competitors without the link to the public good).

==== Clubs ====
Some institutional design, e.g., intellectual property rights, can introduce an exclusion mechanism and turn a pure public good into an impure public good artificially.

If the costs of the exclusion mechanism are not higher than the gain from the collaboration, clubs can emerge. James M. Buchanan showed in his seminal paper that clubs can be an efficient alternative to government interventions.

A nation can be seen as a club whose members are its citizens. Government would then be the manager of this club.

==== Federated structure ====
In some cases, theory shows that collaboration emerges spontaneously in smaller groups rather than in large ones (see e.g. Dunbar's number). This explains why labor unions or charities often have a federated structure.

== In philosophy ==
Since the late 20th century, analytic philosophers have been exploring the nature of collective action in the sense of acting together, as when people paint a house together, go for a walk together, or together execute a pass play. These particular examples have been central for three of the philosophers who have made well known contributions to this literature: Michael Bratman, Margaret Gilbert, and John Searle, respectively.

In (Gilbert 1989) and subsequent articles and book chapters including Gilbert (2006, chapter 7), whom argues for an account of collective action according to which this rests on a special kind of interpersonal commitment, what Gilbert calls a "joint commitment". A joint commitment in Gilbert's sense is not a matter of a set of personal commitments independently created by each of the participants, as when each makes a personal decision to do something. Rather, it is a single commitment to whose creation each participant makes a contribution. Thus suppose that one person says "Shall we go for a walk?" and the other says "Yes, let's". Gilbert proposes that as a result of this exchange the parties are jointly committed to go for a walk, and thereby obligated to one another to act as if they were parts of a single person taking a walk. Joint commitments can be created less explicitly and through processes that are more extended in time. One merit of a joint commitment account of collective action, in Gilbert's view, is that it explains the fact that those who are out on a walk together, for instance, understand that each of them is in a position to demand corrective action of the other if he or she acts in ways that affect negatively the completion of their walk. In (Gilbert 2006a) she discusses the pertinence of joint commitment to collective actions in the sense of the theory of rational choice.

In Searle (1990) Searle argues that what lies at the heart of a collective action is the presence in the mind of each participant of a "we-intention". Searle does not give an account of we-intentions or, as he also puts it, "collective intentionality", but insists that they are distinct from the "I-intentions" that animate the actions of persons acting alone.

In Bratman (1993) Bratman proposed that, roughly, two people "share an intention" to paint a house together when each intends that the house is painted by virtue of the activity of each, and also intends that it is so painted by virtue of the intention of each that it is so painted. That these conditions obtain must also be "common knowledge" between the participants.

Discussion in this area continues to expand, and has influenced discussions in other disciplines including anthropology, developmental psychology, and economics. One general question is whether it is necessary to think in terms that go beyond the personal intentions of individual human beings properly to characterize what it is to act together. Bratman's account does not go beyond such personal intentions. Gilbert's account, with its invocation of joint commitment, does go beyond them. Searle's account does also, with its invocation of collective intentionality. The question of whether and how one must account for the existence of mutual obligations when there is a collective intention is another of the issues in this area of inquiry.

== Spontaneous consensus ==
In addition to the psychological mechanisms of collective action as explained by the social identity model, researchers have developed sociological models of why collective action exists and have studied under what conditions collective action emerges. Along this social dimension, a special case of the general collective action problem is one of collective agreement: how does a group of agents (humans, animals, robots, etc.) reach consensus about a decision or belief, in the absence of central organization? Common examples can be found from domains as diverse as biology (flocking, shoaling and schooling, and general collective animal behavior), economics (stock market bubbles), and sociology (social conventions and norms) among others.

Consensus is distinct from the collective action problem in that there often is not an explicit goal, benefit, or cost of action but rather it concerns itself with a social equilibrium of the individuals involved (and their beliefs). And it can be considered spontaneous when it emerges without the presence of a centralized institution among self-interested individuals.

=== Dimensions ===
Spontaneous consensus can be considered along 4 dimensions involving the social structure of the individuals participating (local versus global) in the consensus as well as the processes (competitive vs cooperative) involved in reaching consensus:

- Competitive
- Cooperative
- Local
- Global

==== Competitive versus cooperative ====
The underlying processes of spontaneous consensus can be viewed either as cooperation among individuals trying to coordinate themselves through their interactions or as competition between the alternatives or choices to be decided upon. Depending on the dynamics of the individuals involved as well as the context of the alternatives considered for consensus, the process can be wholly cooperative, wholly competitive, or a mix of the two.

==== Local versus global ====
The distinction between local and global consensus can be viewed in terms of the social structure underlying the network of individuals participating in the consensus making process. Local consensus occurs when there is agreement between groups of neighboring nodes while global consensus refers to the state in which most of the population has reached an agreement. How and why consensus is reached is dependent on both the structure of the social network of individuals as well as the presence (or lack) of centralized institutions.

=== Equilibrium mechanisms ===
There are many mechanisms (social and psychological) that have been identified to underlie the consensus making process. They have been used to both explain the emergence of spontaneous consensus and understand how to facilitate an equilibrium between individuals and can be grouped according to their role in the process.

- Facilitation of Equilibrium
  - Communication
  - Punishment of Deviants
  - Positive Payoffs
  - Conformity Bias
- Selection of Alternatives
  - Logical Reflection
  - Psychological and shared biases
  - Chance (when all alternatives are equivalent)

=== Methods and techniques ===
Due to the interdisciplinary nature of both the mechanisms as well as the applications of spontaneous consensus, a variety of techniques have been developed to study the emergence and evolution of spontaneous cooperation. Two of the most widely used are game theory and social network analysis.

==== Game theory ====
Traditionally game theory has been used to study zero-sum games but has been extended to many different types of games. Relevant to the study of spontaneous consensus are cooperative and non-cooperative games. Since a consensus must be reached without the presence of any external authoritative institution for it to be considered spontaneous, non-cooperative games and Nash equilibrium have been the dominant paradigm for which to study its emergence.

In the context of non-cooperative games, a consensus is a formal Nash equilibrium that all players tend towards through self-enforcing alliances or agreements.

An important case study of the underlying mathematical dynamics is the coordination game. Even when coordination is desired, it can be difficult to achieve due to incomplete information and constrained time horizons.

==== Social network analysis ====
An alternative approach to studying the emergence of spontaneous consensus—that avoids many of the unnatural or overly constrained assumptions of game theoretic models—is the use of network based methods and social network analysis (SNA). These SNA models are theoretically grounded in the communication mechanism of facilitating consensus and describe its emergence through the information propagation processes of the network (behavioral contagion). Through the spread of influence (and ideas) between agents participating in the consensus, local and global consensus can emerge if the agents in the network achieve a shared equilibrium state. Leveraging this model of consensus, researchers have shown that local peer influence can be used to reach a global consensus and cooperation across the entire network. While this model of consensus and cooperation has been shown to be successful in certain contexts, research suggest that communication and social influence cannot be fully captured by simple contagion models and as such a pure contagion based model of consensus may have limits.

== See also ==
- Anti-corruption collective action
- Collaborative innovation network
- Collective intelligence
- Collective intentionality
- Common property resource
- Constitutional economics
- Coordination good
- Free rider problem
- Group action (sociology)
- Mass collaboration
- Nash equilibrium
- Outline of organizational theory
- Pareto efficiency
- Polytely
- Prisoner's dilemma
- Private-collective model of innovation
- Public good
- Social fact
- Tragedy of the commons
- Tragedy of the anticommons

== Bibliography ==
- Bratman, Michael (October 1993). "Shared intention". Ethics. 104 (1): 97–113. doi:10.1086/293577. JSTOR 2381695. S2CID 222814811.
- Dolata, Ulrich; Schrape, Jan-Felix (2015). "Masses, Crowds, Communities, Movements: Collective Action in the Internet Age". Social Movement Studies. 15: 1–18. doi:10.1080/14742837.2015.1055722. S2CID 141985609.
- Dolata, Ulrich; Schrape, Jan-Felix (2018). Collectivity and Power on the Internet. A Sociological Perspective. London Cham: Springer. doi:10.1007/978-3-319-78414-4. ISBN 978-3-319-78413-7.
- Gilbert, Margaret (1989). On social facts. London New York: Routledge. ISBN 978-0-415-02444-0.
- Gilbert, Margaret (2006a). "Rationality in Collective Action". Philosophy of the Social Sciences. 36 (1): 3–17. doi:10.1177/0048393105284167. S2CID 144590512.
- Gilbert, Margaret (2006). A theory of political obligation: membership, commitment, and the bonds of society. Oxford Oxford New York: Clarendon Press Oxford University Press. ISBN 978-0-19-927495-6.
- Hardin, Russell (1982). Collective action. Baltimore: Johns Hopkins University Press. ISBN 978-0-8018-2819-5.
- Meinzen-Dick, Ruth Suseela; di Gregorio, Monica, eds. (2004). Collective action and property rights for sustainable development. Washington, DC: International Food Policy Research Institute. 2020 Focus No. 11. Pdf.
- Olson, Mancur (1965). The logic of collective action: public goods and the theory of groups. Cambridge, Massachusetts: Harvard University Press. ISBN 978-0-674-53751-4.
- Ostrom, Elinor (1990). Governing the commons: the evolution of institutions for collective action. Cambridge New York: Cambridge University Press. ISBN 978-0-521-40599-7.
- Pokharel, Atul (2024-05-23). Beyond Collective Action Problems: Perceived Fairness and Sustained Cooperation in Farmer Managed Irrigation Systems in Nepal. New York: Oxford Academic. doi:10.1093/oso/9780197755792.001.0001. ISBN 978-0-19-775579-2.
- Searle, John R. (2002), "Collective intentions and actions", in Searle, John R. (ed.), Consciousness and language, New York: Cambridge University Press, pp. 90–105, ISBN 978-0-521-59744-9.
- van Winden, Frans (December 2015). "Political economy with affect: on the role of emotions and relationships in political economics". European Journal of Political Economy. 40 (B): 298–311. doi:10.1016/j.ejpoleco.2015.05.005.
