= Joachim Fischer =

Joachim Fischer may refer to:

- Joachim Fischer Nielsen (born 1978), badminton player from Denmark
- Joachim Fischer (sociologist) (born 1951), German professor of sociology and scholar of philosophical anthropology
