= Michael Tomasello =

American developmental psychologist (born 1950)

- Born: January 18, 1950 (age 76); Bartow, Florida, U.S.

Academic background
- Education: Duke University; University of Georgia
- Thesis: A conceptual analysis of early lexical development (1980)
- Doctoral advisor: Ernst von Glasersfeld

Michael Tomasello (born January 18, 1950) is an American developmental and comparative psychologist, as well as a linguist. He is professor of psychology at Duke University.

Earning many prizes and awards from the end of the 1990s onward, he is considered one of today's most authoritative developmental and comparative psychologists. KNAW identified him as "one of the few scientists worldwide who is acknowledged as an expert in multiple disciplines". According to the APA, Tomasello's "pioneering research on the origins of social cognition has led to revolutionary insights in both developmental psychology and primate cognition."

== Early life and education ==
Tomasello was born in Bartow, Florida and attended high school at the Taft School in Watertown, Connecticut. He received his bachelor's degree 1972 from Duke University and his doctorate in Experimental Psychology 1980 from University of Georgia.

== Career ==
Tomasello was a professor of psychology and anthropology at Emory University in Atlanta, Georgia, US, during the 1980s and 1990s. Subsequently, he moved to Germany to become co-director of Max Planck Institute for Evolutionary Anthropology in Leipzig, and later also honorary professor at University of Leipzig and co-director of the Wolfgang Kohler Primate Research Center. In 2016, he became professor of psychology and neuroscience at Duke University, where he now is James F. Bonk Distinguished Professor.

He works on child language acquisition as a crucially important aspect of the enculturation process. He is a critic of Noam Chomsky's universal grammar, rejecting the idea of an innate universal grammar and instead proposing a functional theory of language development (sometimes called the social-pragmatic theory of language acquisition or usage-based approach to language acquisition) in which children learn linguistic structures through intention-reading and pattern-finding in their discourse interactions with others.

Tomasello also studied broader cognitive skills in a comparative light at the Wolfgang Köhler Primate Research Center in Leipzig. With his research team, he created a set of experimental devices to test toddlers' and apes' spatial, instrumental, and social cognition; he argued that social (even ultrasocial) cognition is what truly sets human apart.

== Uniqueness of human social cognition: broad outlines ==
Tomasello conducted experimental lab work with nonhuman apes to test his ideas around what makes humans unique. Based largely on lab tests, he argued that apes lack a series of skills:

- social learning through deliberate teaching;
- "true imitation," (imitating not only actions but also manners and styles of doing);
- informative pointing;
- perspectival views, looking at the same thing or event alternatively from another agent's angle;
- recursive mind reading, knowing what others know we know they know (and so forth);
- third-party punishment (when agent C punishes or avoids collaborating with agent B because of agent B's unfairness toward agent A);
- building and enlarging common ground (communicating in order to share with others, and building a sphere of things that are commonly known);
- group-mindedness (prescriptive feeling of belonging, of interdependence, of self-monitoring following general, impersonal expectations); and
- cumulative culture, which he referred to as "the ratchet effect".

Critics of Tomasello — including Frans de Waal, Christoph Boesch, Andrew Whiten, and Volker Sommer — argued that he exaggerated human-animal differences and discounted key social abilities in nonhuman primates. Boesch, a fellow Max Planck anthropologist who studied chimpanzees in the field, argued that the severe psychological traumas experienced by Tomasello's lab subjects rendered his conclusions moot. Other critics joined Boesch in highlighting incongruities between Tomasello's experiments on human children and apes, differences that these critics claimed made for apples and oranges comparisons.

== The sharing of attention and of intention ==
Tomasello sees human uniqueness as being preceded and encompassed by the capacity to share attention and intention (collective intentionality), an evolutionary novelty that would have emerged as a cooperative integrating of apes skills that formerly worked in competition.

The overall scheme of sharing of attention and of intention involves inferring a common need; being motivated to act cooperatively to fulfill this need; coordinating individuals' roles and perspectives under the common goal of fulfilling this common need if, and only if, other agents fulfill their commitment toward that goal; and sharing the spoils fairly. Tomasello holds such dual structure of commonality and individuality as being a cognitive integration of skills in mind reading, in instrumental action, and in simulational thinking (meaning agents use an internal representation of the state of things, and simulate actions and outcomes of these actions). Individuals need to make clear or explicit, by eye contact, by gestural pantomime or else, that they intend to coordinate their actions and perspectives under a common goal. Communicating such a specific intent suggest agents can entertain a sense of forming a "we", to which they feel a sense of commitment, such that defecting from collaborating requires an apology or a taking leave. Collaborative agents also see their interaction through a representational format amounting to a bird's eye view or view from nowhere, as suggested by their skills at role switching with a partner, and at inferring what is helpful or relevant to help a partners play his or her role.

Tomasello's defense, use, and deepening of the shared attention and intention hypothesis rely on the experimental data he collected (see also work with Malinda Carpenter), an evolutionary two-step scenario (see below), and to philosophical concepts borrowed from Paul Grice, John Searle, Margaret Gilbert, Michael Bratman, and anthropologist Dan Sperber.

At one point in time, after the emergence of the genus Homo two millions years ago, Homo heidelbergensis or other close candidate became obligate foragers and scavengers under ecological pressures of desertification that led to scarcity of resources. Individuals able to avoid free-riders and to divide the spoils with collaborative partners would have gained an adaptive advantage over non cooperators. The heightened dependence on joint effort to gain food and the social selection of partners are supposed to account for an evolution toward better skills at coordinating individual's roles and perspectives under a common attentional frame (that of the hunt or scavenging) and under a common goal, giving rise to joint, interpersonal intention. Later, around 200,000 years ago, new ecological pressures presumably posed by competition within groups put those in "loose pools" of collaborators at a disadvantage against groups of coherently collaborative individuals working for a common territorial defense. "Individuals ... began to understand themselves as members of particular social group with a particular identity".

For Tomasello, this two-step evolutionary path of macro-ecological pressures affecting micro-level skills in representation, inferences, and self-monitoring, does not hold because natural selection acts on internal mechanisms. "Cognitive processes are a product of natural selection, but they are not its target. Indeed, natural selection cannot even see cognition; it can only see the effects of cognition in organizing and regulating overt actions." Ecological pressures would have put prior cooperative or mutualistic behaviors at such an advantage against competition as to create a new selective pressure favoring new cognitive skills, which would have posed new challenges, in an autocatalytic way.

Echoing the phylogenetic path, humans' unique skills at joint and collective intentionality develop during the individual's lifetime by scaffolding, not only on simple skills like distinguishing animate/inanimate matter, but also on the communicative conventions and institutions forming the socio-cultural environment, forming feedback loops that enrich and deepen both cultural ground and individual's prior skills. "[B]asic skills evolve phylogenetically, enabling the creation of cultural products historically, which then provide developing children with the biological and cultural tools they need to develop ontogenetically".

The sharing of attention and of intention is taken to be prior to language in evolutionary time and in an individual's lifetime, while conditioning language's acquisition through the parsing of joint attentional scenes into actors, objects, events, and the like. More broadly, Tomasello sees the sharing of attention and of intention as the roots of humans' cultural world (the roots of conventions, of group identity, of institutions): "Human reasoning, even when it is done internally with the self, is ... shot through and through with a kind of collective normativity in which the individual regulates her actions and thinking based on the group's normative conventions and standards".

== Awards ==
- Guggenheim Fellowship, 1997
- German National Academy of Sciences (elected, 2003)
- Fyssen Foundation Prize, Paris, 2004
- Cognitive Development Society Book Award, 2005 (for Constructing a Language: A Usage-Based Theory of Language Acquisition)
- Jean Nicod Prize, Paris, 2006
- Mind and Brain Prize, University of Torino, 2007
- Fellow, Cognitive Science Society (elected 2008)
- Hegel Prize, Stuttgart, 2009
- Oswald Külpe Prize, University of Würzburg, 2009
- Max Planck Research Prize [Human Evolution], Humboldt Society, 2010
- Heineken Prize for Cognitive Science, Amsterdam, 2010
- Hungarian National Academy of Sciences (elected, 2010)
- British Academy Wiley Prize in Psychology, 2011
- Klaus Jacobs Research Prize, 2011
- Wiesbadener Helmuth Plessner Prize, 2014
- Distinguished Scientific Contribution Award, American Psychological Association, 2015
- American Academy of Arts and Sciences (elected, 2017)
- National Academy of Sciences (elected, 2017)
- Pour le Mérite for Sciences and Arts, 2020
- David Rumelhart Prize, Cognitive Science Society, 2022

== Selected works ==
- Tomasello, M. & Call, J. (1997). Primate Cognition. Oxford University Press. ISBN 978-0-19-510624-4
- Tomasello, M. (1999). The Cultural Origins of Human Cognition, Harvard University Press. ISBN 0-674-00582-1 (Winner of the William James Book Award of the APA, 2001)
- Tomasello, M. (2003). Constructing a Language: A Usage-Based Theory of Language Acquisition, Harvard University Press. ISBN 0-674-01764-1 (Winner of the Cognitive Development Society Book Award, 2005)
- Tomasello, M. (2008). Origins of Human Communication, MIT Press. ISBN 978-0-262-20177-3 (Winner of the Eleanor Maccoby Book Award of the APA, 2009)
- Tomasello, M. (2009). Why We Cooperate, MIT Press. ISBN 978-0-262-01359-8
- Tomasello, M. (2014). A Natural History of Human Thinking, Harvard University Press. ISBN 978-0-674-72477-8
- Tomasello, M. (2016). A Natural History of Human Morality, Harvard University Press. ISBN 978-0-674-08864-1 (Winner of the Eleanor Maccoby Book Award of the APA, 2018)
- Tomasello, M. (2019). Becoming Human: A Theory of Ontogeny. Harvard University Press.
- Tomasello, M. (2022). The Evolution of Agency: From Lizards to Humans. MIT Press.

== See also ==
- Dawn of Humanity (2015 PBS film)
