= Lenny Moss =

Philosopher of biology

Lenny Moss is a philosopher and a former biomedical scientist. He is presently an “Investigadore Visitantes” at the Instituto de Investigaciones Filosóficas of the Universidad Nacional Autónoma De Mexico (UNAM), Mexico City. He was previously a professor in the Department of Philosophy at the University of Notre Dame in the United States and the Department of Sociology, Philosophy and Anthropology at the University of Exeter in the United Kingdom.

== Education ==
Moss received a Ph.D. at the University of California at Berkeley in biophysics and comparative biochemistry. completing his doctoral research at the Lawrence Berkeley National Laboratory. His graduate work concerned the epigenetic regulation of heterogenous cell surface glycosylation involved in immune evasion of mammary carcinoma cells. After working for several years at the University of California San Francisco Medical Center (UCSF) on the role of developmental-stage specific cell surface glycosylation of cell adhesion molecules in the regulation of human placental cell invasiveness, Moss earned a second Ph.D., in philosophy, from Northwestern University.

== Research ==
His work has focused on bringing the largely German tradition of philosophical anthropology to bear in both theoretical biology and philosophical biology and critical social theory. He is the author of What Genes Can’t Do (MIT).

== Teaching ==
Moss was professor of philosophy at the Universities of Notre Dame (USA) and Exeter (UK) for over 20 years where his teaching included classes in the Philosophy of Biology, Philosophy of Nature, Philosophy of Science, Analytic Metaphysics, Philosophy of Technology, Philosophy of Evil, Ethics, Body and Mind, the Idea of Race, Reading Courses in Kant, in Heidegger's Being and Time, in Nietzsche's Genealogy of Morals, in selected readings of Habermas and in Philosophical Anthropology. He supervised the dissertations of seven doctoral students, five of whom (Including four women) went on to tenure-line academic appointments. Moss was recognized by the Student Guild of the University of Exeter under the category of “Best Post-Graduate Research Supervisor.”
