= Social ontology =

Branch of philosophy

Social ontology is a branch of ontology and metaphysics that studies the nature and basic categories of the social world. It asks which kinds of social entities exist—such as social groups, institutions, social roles, and social categories—and what their existence consists in, including how they depend on and arise out of social interaction, shared attitudes and material realizations.

A primary concern of social ontology is to distinguish genuine social entities from mere aggregates of individuals, and to clarify the relations between individual minds and collective phenomena—such as norms, organizations, and social structures. The field investigates, for example, the metaphysical status of corporations and states, the nature of money and property, the ontology of social categories such as gender and race, and the structure of social practices, rules, and institutions.

Work in social ontology both draws on and informs many areas of philosophy—including the philosophy of social science, political philosophy, philosophy of language, metaethics, feminist philosophy and critical race theory—as well as empirical disciplines such as sociology, economics, anthropology, law, psychology and history. Influential contemporary contributors include John Searle, Margaret Gilbert, Raimo Tuomela, Amie Thomasson, Tony Lawson, Brian Epstein, Ruth Millikan, Sally Haslanger, Maurizio Ferraris, Lynne Rudder Baker and Hans Bernhard Schmid, among many others.

== History ==
Questions that are now classified as social-ontological can be found throughout the history of philosophy, for example in debates about the reality of peoples, states, churches or corporations. The explicit expression ontologie sociale ("social ontology") appears in nineteenth-century political and economic writings, such as Louis P. Massip's 1871 treatise Doctrine républicaine ou principes naturels et économiques d'ontologie sociale.

Classical sociology in the late nineteenth and early twentieth centuries raised recognizably ontological questions in different terminology. Émile Durkheim's account of "social facts" as objective and coercive features of society, Max Weber's analysis of social action and ideal types, and Alfred Schutz's phenomenology of the social world all contributed to later discussions of what kinds of social entities there are and how they relate to individuals.

From the 1960s onward, social ontology became an explicit topic in analytic philosophy through work on speech acts, collective intentionality and group agency. Searle's theory of institutional facts in The Construction of Social Reality (1995) and subsequent writings, Gilbert's plural-subject theory in On Social Facts (1989), Tuomela's studies of we-intentions and group agents, and related work by many other authors helped to establish social ontology as a distinct subfield.

In the early twenty-first century the field underwent further consolidation. Dedicated venues such as the Social Ontology conference series (originating in the European Network on Social Ontology, founded in 2007), the International Social Ontology Society (ISOS, founded in 2012), and the open-access Journal of Social Ontology (established 2015) now provide institutional support for research across philosophy and the social sciences.

== Central questions ==
Philosophers working in social ontology typically distinguish several families of questions. One concerns existence and classification: which kinds of social entities exist, and how should they be taxonomized—for example as social groups, institutions, positions, social kinds or events? A second concerns dependence and realization: in virtue of what do social entities exist, and how do they depend on individual minds, bodies, artifacts and practices? A third concerns persistence and identity: under what conditions does a social entity continue to exist or cease to exist—for example when a parliament is dissolved, a corporation merges, or a club changes its members?

Debate continues over whether social kinds are fully reducible to, or grounded in, non-social facts, or whether they exhibit emergent or irreducible features. Searle has argued that social reality is constituted by collectively accepted status functions imposed on physical objects and persons, and is thus ontologically dependent on underlying physical facts. By contrast, Lynne Rudder Baker and other non-reductive realists maintain that many social phenomena—such as legal systems, corporations and other "mind-dependent" items—are genuine constituents of ontology that cannot be exhaustively captured in purely physical terms.

Social ontology also engages with contested social categories such as gender, race, class, disability and sexual orientation. In this context it overlaps with work in feminist philosophy and critical race theory on social construction and conceptual engineering. Sally Haslanger, for example, has defended analyses of race and gender as socially constructed structural positions within systems of domination and oppression that are nonetheless real and explanatorily important.

== Major approaches ==
=== Collective intentionality and status functions ===
One influential approach, associated especially with John Searle, explains social facts in terms of collective intentionality and "status functions". On this view, many social entities—money, property, marriages, governments—are physical objects or events that have been collectively recognized as having a particular status, typically defined by rights, obligations and other deontic powers. Searle summarizes these constitutive rules with the schema "X counts as Y in context C". Social ontology, on this picture, analyses the logical form of such rules and the background capacities that make collective acceptance possible.

=== Joint commitment and plural subjects ===
Margaret Gilbert defends a "plural subject" theory, on which social groups and joint actions are constituted by joint commitments: individuals openly commit themselves together as a body to do something or to regard something as so. Such joint commitments ground group-level obligations and rights that are not reducible to the private commitments of each individual member. On this view, the existence conditions for many social groups are given by the continued presence of appropriate joint commitments, rather than by mere similarity or aggregation of individuals.

=== We-mode collectivism and group agents ===
Raimo Tuomela has developed a related but distinct "we-mode" account of collective attitudes. Members of a group can act and intend not merely as private "I-mode" individuals but as parts of a "we" that has its own goals and commitments. On this view, many social groups—teams, corporations, states—are group agents with group-level beliefs and intentions, realized in but not simply reducible to the attitudes of their members. Hans Bernhard Schmid and others have further elaborated we-mode and group-agent models in the context of shared agency and organization.

=== Normative and artifactual approaches ===
Amie Thomasson has argued for an "artifactual" or "easy ontology" approach to many social entities. On her view, once we understand the rules governing our use of concepts such as "group", "law" or "money", we can often infer in a relatively straightforward way what exists, since social entities are typically brought into existence by our practices and normative rules of use. This highlights the conceptual and normative dimensions of social ontology, and connects it to projects in conceptual engineering and ameliorative analysis, particularly in debates about gender, race and other social categories.

=== Critical realism and Cambridge social ontology ===
Another influential tradition, associated with critical realism and "Cambridge social ontology", emphasizes emergent social structures and positions. Tony Lawson and collaborators argue that social reality consists largely of positions, roles and networks of rights and obligations that pre-exist particular individuals and have causal powers of their own, even though they are generated and reproduced through human activity. Their work, especially in the philosophy of economics, uses ontological critique of models and methods to motivate alternatives to standard formal approaches.

=== Functional and teleological accounts ===
Teleological accounts analyze social entities in terms of their functions. Building on Ruth Millikan's historical theory of proper functions, some philosophers take social institutions and social kinds to be systems whose members have been selected, sustained or reproduced because they perform characteristic roles, such as coordinating behaviour or solving recurrent problems. Functional explanations have been developed, for example, for social norms, informal institutions and organizational roles.

=== Documentality and the role of documents ===
Other theories place documents and records at the centre of social reality. Maurizio Ferraris's theory of "documentality" claims that social objects are essentially social acts that have been inscribed on some durable medium, encapsulated in the principle "object = inscribed act". On such views, many social entities—contracts, debts, offices, property rights—exist only insofar as there are appropriate documentary traces or records.

== Topics in social ontology ==
=== Social groups and collectives ===
A central topic in social ontology concerns the nature of social groups—such as committees, corporations, crowds, peoples and social movements. Competing accounts treat groups as mere sets of individuals, as mereological fusions, as plural subjects grounded in joint commitments, or as entities constituted by roles and relations within a social structure. Debates include whether groups can bear moral responsibility, have beliefs and intentions, or be the bearers of rights independently of their members.

=== Institutions, organizations and offices ===
Social ontologists also analyze institutions and organizations: relatively stable systems of rules and roles such as legal systems, markets, universities, churches or states. Questions here concern what it is for a rule, norm or social practice to exist; how institutions are created, maintained and changed; and how institutional positions—offices, roles and social locations—relate to the individuals who occupy them.

=== Social categories and social kinds ===
Another cluster of debates concerns social categories and social kinds, such as gender, race, class, caste, citizenship, disability, professions or family roles. Many philosophers argue that these categories are socially constructed but nonetheless real, in the sense that they help structure patterns of privilege, oppression and expectation. Others examine whether such kinds are historically evolved, artefactual or natural in some extended sense, and whether certain categories should be revised or abandoned for ethical and political reasons.

=== Norms, rules and deontic powers ===
Norms and deontic powers—obligations, permissions, rights and authorizations—are often treated as core components of the social world. Social ontology asks, for example, what it is for a rule to be in force, how normative statuses supervene on or are realized by descriptive facts, and how formal law relates to informal social norms.

== Methodology and relation to metaphysics ==
Social ontology raises methodological questions about how to investigate the social world and how it relates to "general" metaphysics. Mason and Ritchie distinguish between views that treat social ontology as continuous with fundamental metaphysics and those that take it to be more closely tied to our classificatory practices and social-scientific theories. In the latter spirit, some philosophers advocate a naturalized social metaphysics in which ontological posits are constrained by the best empirical social science.

Different methodological proposals include using inference to the best explanation from social-scientific theories, more traditional conceptual analysis of everyday and scientific concepts, and "ameliorative" projects that deliberately revise concepts for ethical or political purposes.

Another debate concerns whether social ontology is properly part of ontology at all. Searle has sometimes suggested that his project belongs primarily to the philosophy of mind and language, since social facts are ultimately built out of mental states and linguistic practices. Baker and others argue instead that social entities are indispensable components of any adequate ontology of the world we inhabit, even if they are not fundamental in a physicalist sense.

Questions about the role of ideology, power and social position in social ontology have also become prominent, especially in feminist, decolonial and critical race traditions, which emphasize that our social categories can both reflect and reinforce structures of domination and resistance.

== Relation to the social sciences ==
Social ontology is closely connected to the philosophy of social science. Ontological assumptions about the nature of social structures, agents and institutions can shape methods and explanations in fields such as economics, sociology, political science, anthropology and history. Conversely, empirical findings and theoretical models in these fields inform philosophical accounts of what social entities there are and how they behave.

For example, Lawson contends that many mainstream economic models presuppose an individualistic, atomistic ontology ill-suited to open, evolving social systems, and calls for models that better reflect the ontological features of social reality. Guala and Hindriks argue that social ontology can help clarify when different social-scientific models are genuinely incompatible and when they simply describe different aspects or levels of the same underlying structures, thereby contributing to debates about model pluralism and realism in the social sciences.

Recent work in naturalized social metaphysics explores whether and how social ontology should be constrained by the methods and results of social science, or whether some ontological questions are largely conceptual or normative.

== See also ==
- Collective intentionality
- Documentality
- Cambridge social ontology
- Philosophy of social science
- Social phenomenology
- Social philosophy
- Structure and agency
- There is no such thing as society, a famous claim by UK Prime Minister Margaret Thatcher
