= Journal of Social Ontology =

- Discipline: Social ontology
- Language: English
- Edited by: Hans Bernhard Schmid, Niels de Haan, David P. Schweikard

Publication details
- History: 2015–present
- Publisher: De Gruyter
- Frequency: biannual
- Open access: Yes

Standard abbreviations
- ISO 4: J. Soc. Ontol.

Indexing
- ISSN: 2196-9663

Links
- Journal homepage

The Journal of Social Ontology is a peer-reviewed interdisciplinary academic journal with a focus on social ontology and collective intentionality. It is supported by International Social Ontology Society. The journal's editor-in-chief is Hans Bernhard Schmid.

== Abstracting and Indexing ==
The journal is indexed in:

- Baidu Scholar
- Chronos Hub
- CNKI Scholar (China National Knowledge Infrastructure)
- CNPIEC - cnpLINKer
- Dimensions
- DOAJ (Directory of Open Access Journals)
- EBSCO (relevant databases)
- EBSCO Discovery Service
- Genamics JournalSeek
- Google Scholar
- J-Gate
- JournalTOCs
- KESLI-NDSL (Korean National Discovery for Science Leaders)
- Microsoft Academic
- MyScienceWork
- Naver Academic
- Naviga (Softweco)
- Norwegian Register for Scientific Journals, Series and Publishers
- PhilPapers
- Primo Central (ExLibris)
- ProQuest (relevant databases)
- Publons
- QOAM (Quality Open Access Market)
- ReadCube
- SCImago (SJR)
- SCOPUS
- Semantic Scholar
- Sherpa/RoMEO
- Summon (ProQuest)
- TDNet
- Ulrich's Periodicals Directory/ulrichsweb
- WanFang Data
- WorldCat (OCLC)
- Yewno Discover
