= Community: a Sociological Study =

1917 book by British sociologist Robert Morrison MacIver

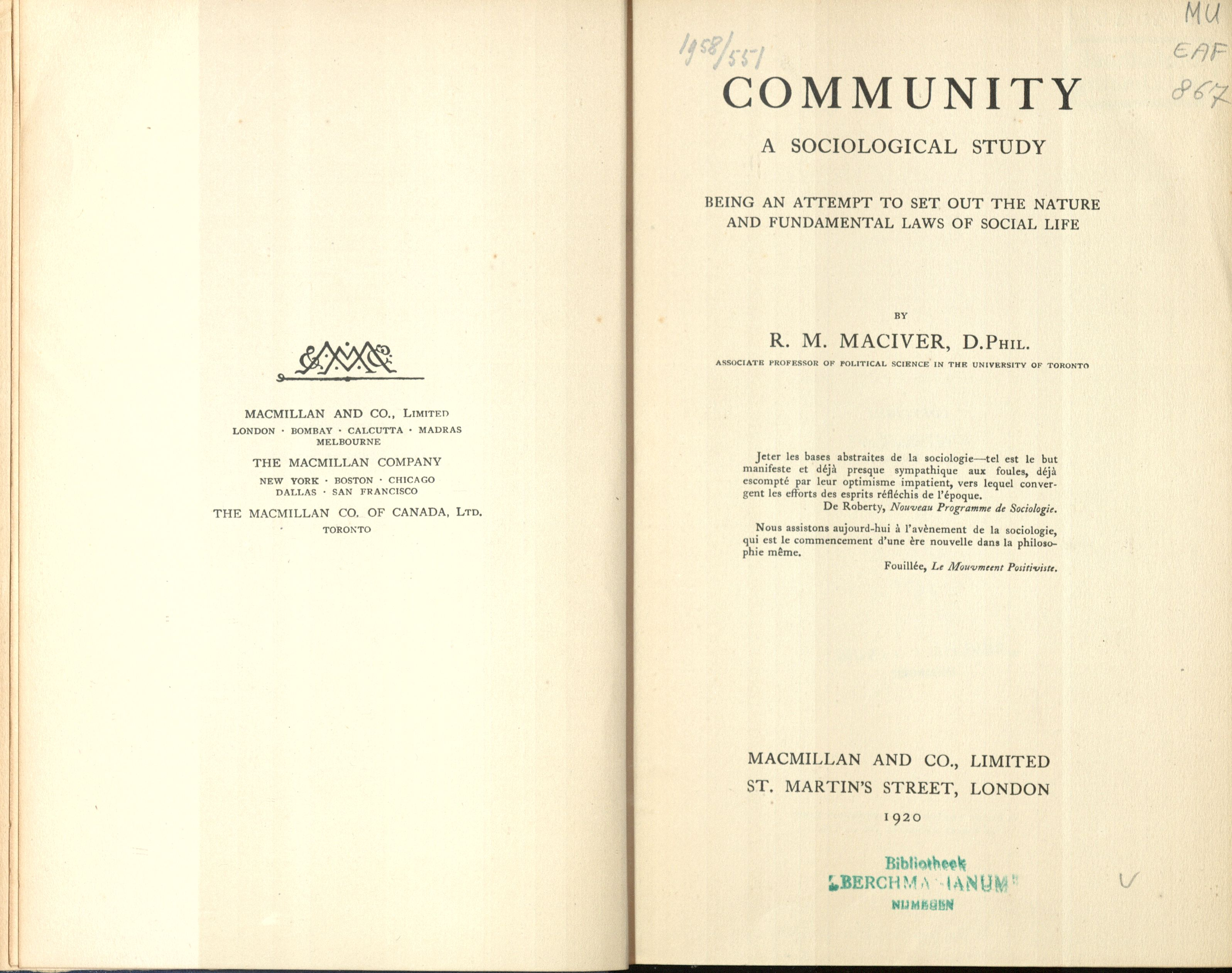
- Author: Robert Morrison MacIver
- Genre: Sociology
- Publication date: 1917

Pdf of the book

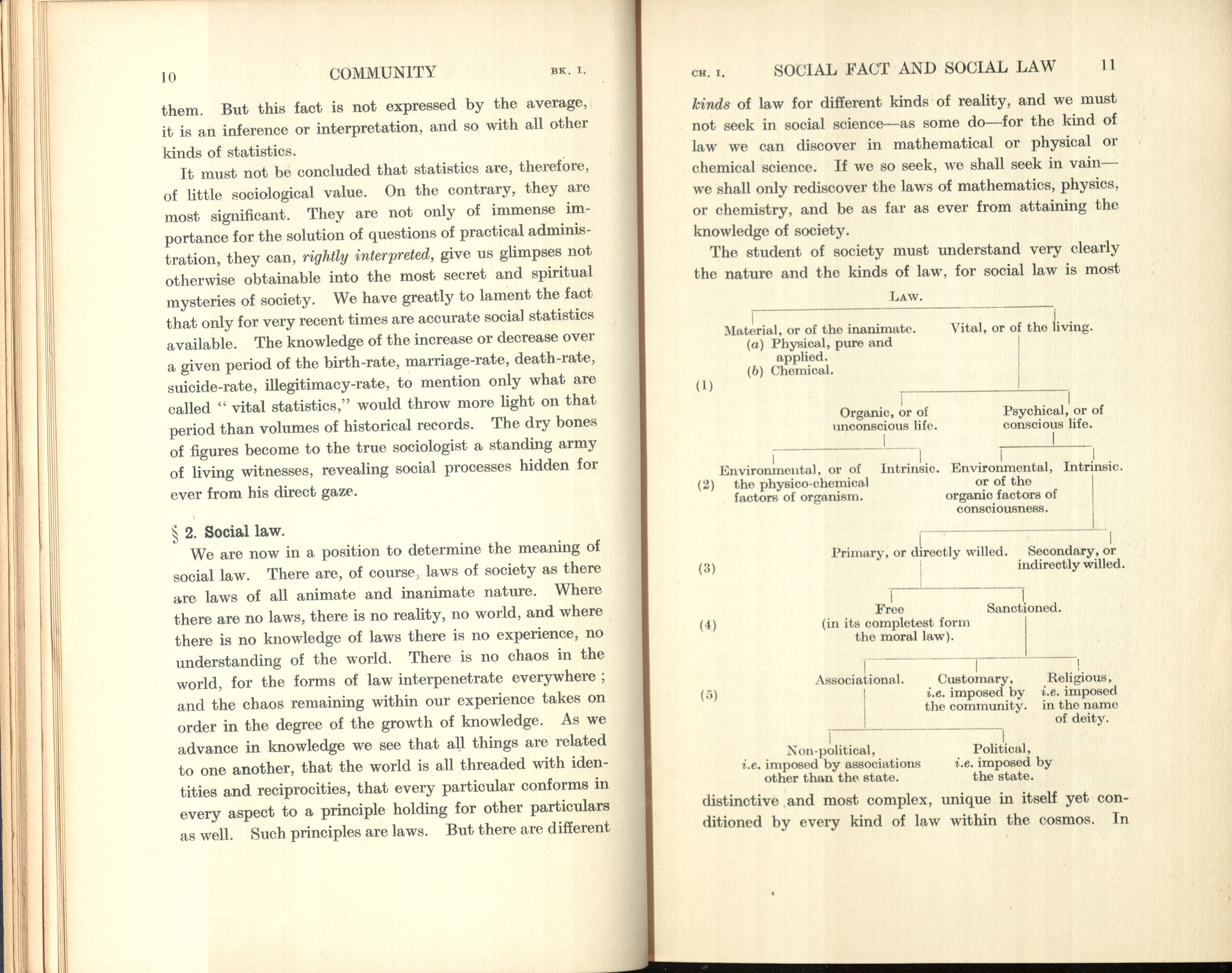
Two pages from the book

Community: a Sociological Study: Being an Attempt to Set Out the Nature and Fundamental Laws of Social Life is a book written by British political scientist Robert Morrison MacIver. The book was completed in 1914, but got its first publication in 1917. In 1920, the second publication introduced an overall revision of the content, and the third publication in 1924 received minor changes to the content. Community aims to explore the "anatomy of society" by looking at the constructions behind social relations, their significance and how they function. The book argues that society is rooted in community (the common life shared by related people). Associations (organised groups of people with a purpose) and the state are distinct social phenomena and should not be mistaken as a form of community, but rather serve a different purpose.

== Context ==
Several developments in the world of sociology during the 19th century had let to the writing of Community. After the French Revolution, the positivist approach that had risen in Europe during the Enlightenment era had a strong influence on the sociology at that time. Thanks to Auguste Comte, positivism greatly helped sociology become a renowned science as it portrayed it as a way to achieve societal wholeness, reminiscent of traditional religion. In 1887 German sociologist Ferdinand Tönnies published a book called Gemeinschaft and Gesellschaft. His work distinguished and conceptualised two types of human association - community and society. Community was defined by its aspects of solidarity, strong social bonds, similarity of beliefs between its members, and more direct relationships. Society was seen as a more modern way of human relations that features rationality, individualism, self-sufficiency, and strong central organisation. A few years later, Émile Durkheim published his works - The Division of Labour in Society (1893), The Rules of Sociological Method (1895), and The Elementary forms of Religious Life (1912), which established the foundation for a distinct social science that had still been largely underrepresented compared to well established sciences like biology, physics and chemistry. These publications provided the perspective of structural functionalism on social phenomena in the field of sociology, and introduced more technical terminology like social fact that allowed sociology to solidify its place among the sciences. All these changes in the field of sociology inspired the writing of Community.

MacIver became a scholar in 1907 during his mid twenties and published some articles in social science journals like The Political Quarterly, The Philosophy Review, The International Journal of Ethics and The Sociological Review. Community was MacIver's first book and was published relatively early in his career. The state of modern science is what motivated the author to write the book. MacIver believed that Community, or common life as he defines it, plays the most integral part in what social science aims to study. He believed that regardless of the detailed research done on social phenomena, there has been no clear comprehensive understanding of community provided by the sciences. The author was a very passionate opponent of the popular reductionistic view that had been a common tradition in all mainstream sciences like economics, psychology and biology during that era. He vouched for a new method of study that accounts for detail instead of ignoring it for the sake of a simple, all-encompassing theory. A major part of the book is a justification of sociology as a valid science.

== Contents ==
The book is divided into three parts, which are named "books" by the author. Each part contains multiple chapters, and there are several appendices at the end of the book.

The first part lays the groundwork for the narrative of the book. The first chapter defines social fact and social law and highlights the importance of social phenomena, which were commonly underrepresented at that time compared to psychological and biological phenomena. In the second chapter an important distinction between community and association is examined. Community is defined as a group of people with a shared lifestyle, while association is defined as an organised group of people, sharing a specific purpose. The state is highlighted as an association instead of a community, although it can serve a special function unlike a typical association. The third chapter compares sociology to other sciences and defends the importance of sociology as a true and valid science.

In the second part of the book the characteristics, features and rules of community are analysed. The first chapter is focused on common analogies of community: an organism, mind, and a greater whole. They become refuted as the narrative continues. It is argued they try to reduce and simplify complex relationships and behaviour in a more biological or psychological way, which is not suitable for sociological phenomena. In the second chapter the building blocks of community like common interests, shared values, and the willful interrelations among members are reviewed. Associations as origins for community and their structure are examined in the third chapter. The forth chapter outlines institutions, defining them as stable structures arising from community life that typically organize and control behaviour.

The development of a community and its importance are discussed in part three. Social progress and the concept of “communal evolution” are evaluated in the first chapter. The focus of the second chapter is on the argument that unlike individuals, communities do not inevitably die. The third chapter introduces MacIver's central law - the differentiation of community is relative to he growth of individual personality. The concepts of communal coordination and the unity of individual life are introduced and analysed in chapters four and five. The final two chapters introduce 2 other laws: the correlation of socialisation and communal economy, and the correlation between socioalisation and the control of the environment. The book ends with a few appendices that provide a more personal outlook on the author's motivations and his responses to different criticism. Themes of the individual compared to the community, neo-Hegelian understanding of society and the state, morality of culture and correlation between life and the environment are discussed.

== Versions ==
The first edition of the book included an analysis of “false perspectives”, elements and structure of community, and the role of institutions. The second publishing of the book in 1920 featured a brand new preface, written in 1919, in which the author defends the book's scope and sociology as a science. The publishing included an overall revision with additions and omissions of several parts of the book. The narrative was shifted from biological and psychological to a more sociological framing. The third edition in 1924 (with a second printing in 1928) includes “slight additions or changes” and an addition to the appendices. In 1970 a fourth edition of the book was published to make sure it can be readily available in a post-war era, which stands to showcase the relevance of the book 50 years later.

== Reception ==
When Community was first published in 1917, it was quickly recognised by Nature and praised due to its ability to showcase both the importance of individual anatomy and social integration. The article acts as a resume of the book showcasing the most important aspects of it: the understanding of society as a system of relations where individual freedom and social order complement each other; the definitions of community, association and state proposed by the author; and the understanding of community as a less organic and more social entity, defined by the interdependence of individuals, their wills, interests and purpose. Since its print the book had widespread impact beyond sociology, being published in 2 well known journals in 1917 and 1918. In 1917 The American Political Science Review released a detailed publication on the content of the book. In 1918 the work was assessed by The Philosophical Review, which took great interest into the main theme of the book, which was the autonomy and separation between community, association and the state. Addressed as "philosophical refreshment", the book was appreciated for its new ideas, but scrutinised for their lack of application - "Dr. McIver is a penetrating thinker who is unfortunately too exclusively a thinker." The review welcomed the "rapprochement" of the ideas in the field of psychology and sociology, but was rather more critical in terms of recommending the book. In 2007 Geoff Payne published an article that critically evaluates Community. The article praised the interdisciplinary scope of the book in terms of philosophy, political science and sociology and highlighted its effort to define sociology as an important discipline on its own next to psychology, economics and political science. As also seen in The Philosophical Review, Payne recognised the abstraction of the book and its emphasis on ”common life”. He argued that such definition lacks any concrete guidance for further research. Another major criticism was the lack of attention towards non-WEIRD societies, which became more and more recognised in science after the publication of the book. Nonetheless, the article concludes by indicating the relevance of the book as a foundation for MacIver's work and sociology as a whole.

Community as a topic of study sees a slight resurgence after the publication of the book, but it is short lived as MacIver himself shifts his focus towards associations and the state. In his book The Modern State the author follows the same separation of community, association and state but he turns to answer the question who actually governs a town instead of social life itself. In 1937 MacIver publishes his most famous book - Society: A Textbook of Sociology, which very clearly outlines his direction as a scholar. Society, unlike Community which was a theoretical work, was meant as an introduction to sociology with the target audience being students. In the late 20th century classic communities become re-studied as a tool to track social change, mobility and exploration of the "bounded community" idea. In the modern digital world community no longer has a place-exclusive definition. Online communities and globalisation of the world have shifted our understanding of community towards relations and association webs.
