= Brian Epstein (philosopher) =

American philosopher

- Awards: Lakatos Award

Education
- Education: Princeton University (BA), University of Oxford (MSt), Stanford University (PhD)
- Thesis: Simple Words and Subtle Things: Social Kinds and the Making of Reference (2004)
- Doctoral advisor: John William Etchemendy

Philosophical work
- Era: Contemporary philosophy
- Region: Western philosophy
- Institutions: Tufts University
- Main interests: Social ontology, metaphysics, philosophy of science

Brian Epstein is an American philosopher and professor of philosophy at Tufts University. He is known for his works on social ontology and is a winner of the Lakatos Award. He specializes in social ontology, metaphysics, and the philosophy of the social sciences.

== Books ==
- Social Ontology, Cambridge University Press, 2025.
- The Ant Trap: Rebuilding the Foundations of the Social Sciences, Oxford University Press, 2015.
- Cambridge Companion to the Metaphysics of Law (co-edited with George Pavlakos and Corrado Roversi), Cambridge University Press, expected publication 2026.
- The Oxford Handbook of Social Ontology (co-edited with Sally Haslanger, Stephanie Collins, and Hans-Bernhard Schmid), Oxford University Press, expected publication 2025.
