= Raimo Tuomela =

Finnish philosopher (1940–2020)

Raimo Heikki Tuomela
- Born: 9 October 1940; Helsinki, Finland
- Died: 22 November 2020 (aged 80); Helsinki, Finland

Education
- Education: University of Helsinki; Stanford University

Raimo Heikki Tuomela (9 October 1940 – 22 November 2020) was a Finnish philosopher.

== Career ==
Tuomela received his first degree of doctor of philosophy in 1968 from the University of Helsinki and the second one in 1969 from Stanford University. Tuomela was full professor of philosophy (especially methodology and philosophy of the social sciences) at the Department of Philosophy, University of Helsinki in 1971–2008.

Having earlier worked and published in many fields of philosophy, especially philosophy of science and philosophy of action, the theory of social action has been his main research interest.

Tuomela received several grants and awards, including the Alexander von Humboldt Foundation Research Award (Forschungspreis), awarded in recognition of achievements in research, and the honour prize of Finnish Academy of Science and Letters.

During the five-year period 1995–2000, Tuomela was Academy Professor at the Academy of Finland. This research professorship also included a research group working within the general field of the philosophy of social action.

== Books ==
In English

- Theoretical Concepts. Library of Exact Philosophy 10, Springer-Verlag, Wien and New York, 1973, 254 pp.
- Theoretical Concepts and Hypothetico-Inductive Inference (together with Ilkka Niiniluoto). Synthese Library, D. Reidel Publishing Company, Dordrecht and Boston, 1973, 262 pp.
- Human Action and Its Explanation: A Study on the Philosophical Foundations of Psychology. Synthese Library, D. Reidel Publishing Co., Dordrecht and Boston, 1977, 426 pp.
- A Theory of Social Action. D. Reidel Publishing Company, Dordrecht, Boston, and Lancaster, 1984, 534 pp.
- Science, Action, and Reality. D. Reidel Publishing Company, Dordrecht, Boston, and Lancaster, 1985, 274 pp.
- The Importance of Us: A Philosophical Study of Basic Social Notions. Stanford Series in Philosophy, Stanford University Press, Stanford, Calif., 1995, 470 pp.
- Cooperation: A Philosophical Study, Philosophical Studies Series, Kluwer Academic Publishers, 2000, 431 pp.
- The Philosophy of Social Practices: A Collective Acceptance View, Cambridge University Press, 2002, 274 pp.
- The Philosophy of Sociality, Oxford University Press, 2007, 318 pp.
- Social Ontology: Collective Intentionality and Group Agents, 2013, New York: Oxford University Press.

In Finnish

- Tiede, toiminta ja todellisuus. Tieteellisen maailmankäsityksen filosofiset perusteet, Gaudeamus, Jyväskylä, 1983.

== See also ==
- Collective intentionality
