= Boris Gourevitch =

Russian-French-American author, activist

- Born: July 8, 1889; Uman, Kiev Governorate, Russian Empire
- Died: April 4, 1964 (aged 74); New York City, United States
- Occupation: Writer
- Known for: Books, peace activism, nominated twice for Nobel Peace Prize

Boris Gourevitch (July 8, 1889—April 4, 1964) was a noted author and peace activist.

His The Road to Peace and to Moral Democracy, earned him to be nominated for the Nobel Peace Prize in 1957 and again in 1959.

He spent 12 years on the writing, the 2,700-page two-volume work, an "encyclopedia of peace" and history, in favor of international reforms to overcome the appeals of Communism and to join in a United Nations "economic parliament of humanity" to build up underdeveloped countries.

Gourevitch was born in Uman, in the Kiev province of then Russia. His father, Abraham, obtained a degree from the University of Kharkov, a physician, had spent in exile, many years in Switzerland. He obtained there his medical degree from University of Bern. He "fought during his whole life for the principles of liberty and for the human rights of peasants and Jews." His mother was Sarah Gourevitch, née Grinberg, one of the first women in Russia to obtain a university education, a friend of many Russian writers. Her grandfather created a home for the indigent in Uman.

Boris, though arrested for political activities interrupting his education at St. Vladimir University in Kiev was interrupted in 1908, yet, he eventually was graduated from the faculty of law.

His earlier writings, while in Russia included appeals for pacifism, a philosophical novel, works on the cultural life of Jews, the peoples of Russia and poetry.

After the Soviets took over in Russia, Gourevitch lived in France.

He formed a Committee for the Emancipation of Jews in face of Hitler's rise.

He was also noted for efforts in rescuing Jews during the Holocaust.

Later on, he formed the Union for the Protection of the Human Person. He went to the United States in 1939 to set up American branches. Before and during World War II it was active in efforts for refugees and concentration camp prisoners and their resettlement. In the 1950s, professor Robert M. MacIver and Albert Simard, among others, were also active in this organization. In 1955, the three signed a letter addressed to South Africa:

The Union for the Protection of the Human Person by International Social and Economic Cooperation sends its greetings and cordial wishes to the Congress of the People. Only by insuring the equality of opportunity in education, work, and social life for all citizens can a nation develop its spiritual resources and rise to the summit of human culture. Every individual should be judged on his merits and not on the color of his skin or on his origin. Great destiny awaits the country founded by noble men who sought political and religious freedom if this country will implement the great principle of brotherhood of men and rejects all calls for interracial or class struggle.

Gourevitch died on April 4, 1964, at the age of 74, in New York.

== See also ==
- Robert M. MacIver
- Albert Simard
