= Helmuth Plessner =

German philosopher and sociologist (1892–1985)

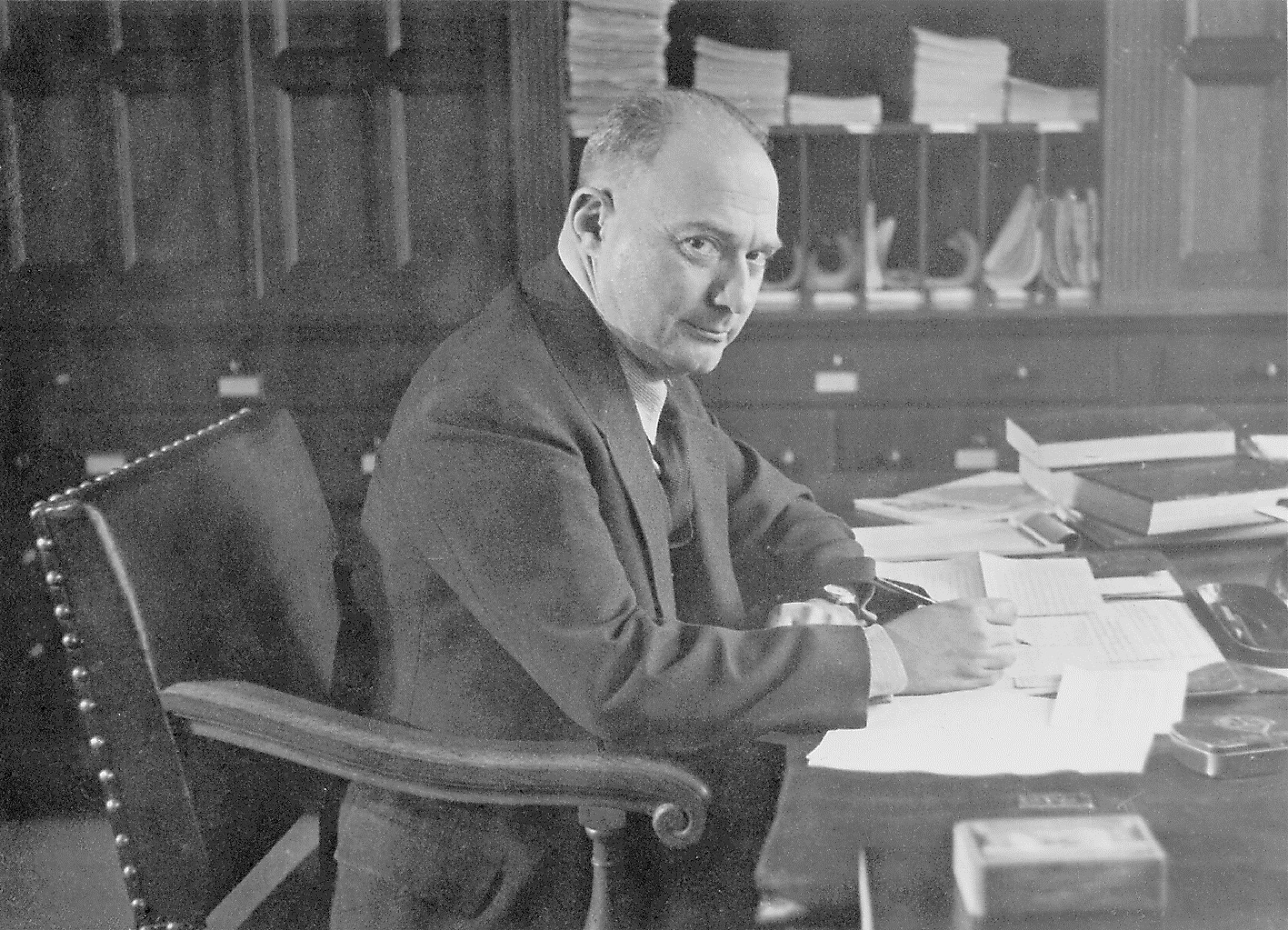
- Born: 4 September 1892; Wiesbaden, German Empire
- Died: 12 June 1985 (aged 92); Göttingen, West Germany

Academic background
- Education: University of Erlangen
- Doctoral advisor: Paul Hensel
- Other advisor: Max Scheler

Academic work
- Discipline: Philosophy; Sociology
- Sub-discipline: Philosophical anthropology
- Institutions: University of Groningen

Helmuth Plessner (German: [ˈplɛsnɐ]; 4 September 1892 – 12 June 1985) was a German philosopher and sociologist, and a primary advocate of "philosophical anthropology".

== Life and career ==
Plessner had an itinerant education in Germany between 1910 and 1920. He studied medicine at Freiburg University before moving on to zoology and philosophy at Heidelberg University. At Göttingen University, he studied phenomenology with Husserl, and finally earned his doctorate from Erlangen University in 1916 under Paul Hensel. He wrote his habilitation thesis at Cologne University under the guidance of Max Scheler.

Plessner then held a professorship at Cologne from 1926 to 1933, when he was forced to resign his position because of Jewish ancestry on his father's side. Living in isolation, Plessner initially fled Germany to Istanbul. He returned to Europe at the invitation of Frederik Jacobus Johannes Buytendijk in the Netherlands. But when Germany invaded, he returned to living underground until 1946, when he was offered the chair in philosophy at the University of Groningen. In 1951, after seventeen years of exile from Germany, Plessner returned as the chair of Sociology in Göttingen. He was chairman from 1953 to 1959 of the Deutsche Gesellschaft für Soziologie.

In 1959, he became foreign member of the Royal Netherlands Academy of Arts and Sciences.

== Philosophy ==
His masterwork of philosophical anthropology is Levels of Organic Life and the Human (1928), which argues that the humans are 'naturally artificial beings' within living nature and attempts revocation of mind–body dualism. Plessner's biological framework conceptualizes human living in relation to plant and animal living, however much the human being becomes a cultural animal whose form of life can no longer be gauged strictly by, say, zoology or evolutionary psychology.

=== Plessner's material(ist) a priori ===
Plessner developed a philosophical biology and anthropology which amounted to a hermeneutics of nature. According to Plessner, life expresses itself, and part of this expression is in terms of sentient lifeforms. In expressing itself through the human senses, it provides the (material) a priori constituents of perception (to replace Kant's cognitive idealism of a priori categories and intuitions produced by transcendental subjectivity as the filter through which we spontaneously order experience of the world). In other words, the formal qualities that make up our consciousness a priori—given as the conditions through which we experience things—conditions such as time, space, causality and number, and, indeed, the laws of physics, however we may then conceptualize them, are given to us both in our own physical nature, and in the physical nature of the environments we inhabit, through our growth from and interactions within these environments.

=== Three categories of nature's a priori and the "eccentricity" of human intentionality ===
From Husserl and Scheler, Plessner adapted the idea of the intentionality of consciousness away from the need for a transcendental ego or apperception and instead grounds it in the behaviour (in the broadest sense of the term) of environmentally interactive organisms as a realizing of borders that represents the point where the impulses or growth of organisms meet with their environments, are realized in the act of self-positioning. These are the scopes of action and understanding that define consciousness and which at the same time ground it in the material world of nature. In terms of plants, their self-expression is utterly open—their borders are defined by only very simple forms of feedback, and the plant has no ability to express intentional preferences regarding its environment; animals, on the other hand, are aware of their own borders and are constantly pressed back within them, thus exhibiting a closed kind of intentionality trapped by its own borders, this is the limit of their expression. Finally, humans alternate between open and closed intentionality—we are these borders, but also, we have them, and the limits of these borders of human action, influence and being Plessner described as the eccentricity of human intentionality in its environmental relations and determination. For Plessner, our own subjectivity can be understood in terms of the expressive a priori in nature, and our experience of and relationship to it.

== Wiesbadener Helmuth Plessner Preis ==
The city of Wiesbaden has created an award in honor of Helmuth Plessner in 2014. It serves to promote and appreciate excellent scientists and intellectuals who have worked and work in reference to Plessner. It is awarded every three years and is donated with 20,000 euros. The first prizewinner is Michael Tomasello.

== Bibliography ==
=== In German ===
- Die wissenschaftliche Idee. Ein Entwurf über ihre Form, Heidelberg 1913.
- Vom Anfang als Prinzip der Bildung transzendentaler Wahrheit (Begriff der kritischen Reflexion), Heidelberg 1918.
- Die Einheit der Sinne. Grundlinien einer Ästhesiologie des Geistes, Bonn 1923.
- Grenzen der Gemeinschaft. Eine Kritik des sozialen Radikalismus, Bonn 1924.
- Die Stufen des Organischen und der Mensch. Einleitung in die philosophische Anthropologie, Berlin / Leipzig 1928.
- Macht und menschliche Natur. Ein Versuch zur Anthropologie der geschichtlichen Weltansicht, in: Fachschriften zur Politik und staatsbürgerlichen Erziehung, Nr. 3, hrsg. v. Ernst von Hippel, Berlin 1931.
- Die verspätete Nation. Über die Verführbarkeit bürgerlichen Geistes, Stuttgart 1959 (ursprünglich 1935).
- Lachen und Weinen. Eine Untersuchung nach den Grenzen menschlichen Verhaltens, Arnhem 1941.
- Zur Anthropologie des Schauspielersin: Festschrift für H. J. Pos, Amsterdam 1948, 208-223.
- Das Lächeln, in: Pro regno et sanctuario. Festschrift für G. van der Leeuw, Nijkerk 1950, 365-376.
- Conditio humana, in: Propyläen Weltgeschichte. Eine Universalgeschichte, hrsg. v. Golo Mann / Alfred Heuß, Bd. I: Vorgeschichte – Frühe Hochkulturen, Berlin / Frankfurt a.M. / Wien 1961: Propyläen Verlag, 33-86.
- Die Emanzipation der Macht, in: Von der Macht. Hannoversche Beiträge zur politischen Bildung, Bd. 2, hrsg. von der Niedersächsischen Landeszentrale für politische Bildung. Hannover 1962, 7-25.
- Anthropologie der Sinne, in: Philosophische Anthropologie [1970/A1], 187-251.

=== In English ===
- The Limits of Community. A. Critique of Social Radicalism, trans. and intro. by Andrew Wallace, New York: Prometheus Books, 1999.
- Laughing and Crying: A Study of the Limits of Human Behaviour, trans. J. S. Churchill and Marjorie Grene, intro. by Marjorie Grene, Evanston: Northwestern University Press, 1970.
- The Social Conditions of Modern Painting, in Erwin W. Straus and Richard M. Griffith (eds.), Aisthesis and Aesthetics: The Fourth Lexington Conference on Pure and Applied Phenomenology, Pittsburgh, 1970: 178-188.
- "A Newton of a Blade of Grass? (and Discussion)", in Marjorie Grene (ed.), Toward a Unity of Knowledge, Psychological Issues, Vol. VI, No. 2, New York, 1969: 135-176.
- "De Homine Abscondito", Social Research 36 (1969): 497-509.
- "On Human Expression", Phenomenology: Pure and Applied: The First Lexington Conference, ed. Erwin Straus, Pittsburgh, 1964: 63-74.
- "On the Relation of Time to Death", Man and Time: Papers from the Eranos Yearbooks, ed. Joseph Campbell, Princeton, 1957: 233-263.
- The Levels of Organic Life and the Human: Introduction to Philosophical Anthropology, New York: Fordham University Press, 2019.
- Philosophical Anthropology, trans. Nils F. Schott, intro. Heike Delitz and Robert Seyfert, Evanston: Northwestern University Press, 2018.
