= Gilbert Chinard =

French-American historian (1881–1972)

- Born: October 17, 1881; Châtellerault, France
- Died: February 8, 1972 (aged 90); Princeton, New Jersey, USA
- Occupations: Professor; historian; author
- Spouse: Emma Blanchard
- Children: Francis; Lucienne

Gilbert Chinard (1881–1972) was a French-American historian, professor emeritus, who authored over 40 books.

Born on October 17, 1881, in Chatellerault, France, to Hilaire and Marie (Blanchard) Chinard, educated at the Universities of Poitiers and Bordeaux, in 1908, he married Emma Blanchard, then moved to New York as a visiting instructor in French Literature, leading him in an American academic career, teaching positions at Brown University (1908–12), the University of California, Berkeley (1912–1919), Johns Hopkins University (1919–36), and Princeton University (1937–1950).

Chinard was awarded Guggenheim Fellowship for French Literature. He was promoted from Chevalier to Officier of the Légion d’Honneur in 1934.

Among the many books he authored, were, notably: “Thomas Jefferson, the Apostle of Americanism” (1929), “Hon, est John Adams” (1933) and “L'Apothdose de Benjamin Franklin”, published in Paris in 1955. Famed as a Jefferson scholar. He is noted as being sympathetic to Jefferson.

During WWII, Chinard was active in Free France. In May 1941, Chinard was "one of the seven most influential French men in America" who wrote President Roosevelt, to "congratulate him on his strong warning to the Vichy government." In 1942, he presided over a France Forever meeting. And in 1946, joined its ceremonial activities with Albert Simard.

Chinard was a member of the American Philosophical Society, an honorary member of the American Association of Teachers of French. and president of the Modern Language Association (in 1956).

Chinard died on February 8, 1972, in Princeton, at the age of 90.

The Gilbert Chinard Prize is awarded each year by the Society for French Historical Studies - for a book published the preceding year by a North American press in one of the two following fields: the history of French-American relations; or the comparative history of France and North, Central, or South America.

== See also ==
Robert Penn Warren
