= Frank Buytendijk =

Dutch author of management books

Frank Buytendijk (The Hague, 1969) is a Dutch author of management books. He studied business and information technology at the Hogeschool Utrecht (University of Applied Sciences Utrecht), was a consultant at various firms in his home country, was a research analyst and held executive positions in various large, medium and small software companies. He has a background in business intelligence, corporate performance management and business process management. Buytendijk is also a visiting fellow at Cranfield University School of Management. In 2012, he was appointed fellow at The Data Warehousing Institute (TDWI). Currently, Buytendijk is a research vice president at analyst firm Gartner, where he served before as well between 2001 and 2006.

Buytendijk wrote five books related to strategy, organizational behavior and performance management. A common theme throughout these books is the application of stakeholder theory in business.

According to managementboek.nl, Buytendijk's first book on balanced scorecards briefly reached the #1 sales position for management books in the Netherlands; it remained in the top 100 for 890 days. His second book - on data warehouses - quickly followed. This was a more technology-oriented book. Both the first and second book were written in Dutch.

Buytendijk's third book, titled "Performance Leadership," was published by McGraw-Hill; it discussed the relationship between performance management and organizational behavior. The book has its roots in behavioral economics. "Dealing with Dilemmas", published by John Wiley & Sons, followed in 2010. It argues, following Henry Mintzberg, that strategy is full of dilemmas that require a different approach than traditional analysis, namely the opposite, synthesis. Part of the book on scenario planning and strategy maps is also available as a case study in the Harvard Business Review database. The fifth book, called "Socrates Reloaded," consists of a number of essays diving deeper into philosophical aspects of business and technology that started to emerge in "Dealing with Dilemmas".

== Bibliography ==
- Balanced Scorecard: Van Meten Naar Managen (Dutch), Buytendijk, F.A. & Brinkhuis-Slaghuis, J., 2000, Kluwer, ISBN 9014065744
- Datawarehouses: Bron van Kennis voor Marketing en Sales (Dutch), Buytendijk, F.A. & Groot, C. de, 2000, Kluwer, ISBN 9014068204
- Performance Leadership, Buytendijk, F.A., 2008, McGraw-Hill, ISBN 0071599649
- Dealing with Dilemmas, Buytendijk, F.A., 2010, Wiley & Sons, ISBN 0470630310
- Socrates Reloaded: The Case for Ethics in Business & Technology, Buytendijk, F.A., 2012, ISBN 1478316349
