= Margaret Gilbert =

British philosopher (born 1942)

Margaret Gilbert (born 1942) is a British philosopher who contributed to the foundations of the analytic philosophy of social phenomena. She also made substantial contributions to the fields of political philosophy, the philosophy of law, and ethics. She is a Distinguished Professor and the Abraham I. Melden Chair in Moral Philosophy at the University of California, Irvine.

== Life ==
Gilbert was born in the United Kingdom, the second and youngest child of Peter Gilbert, a north London jeweler, and his wife Miriam. The original family name Goldberg was Anglicised to Gilbert. All four of her grandparents had been born in the Pale of Settlement in Tsarist Russia (modern Poland and Lithuania).

She obtained a "double first" B.A. degree in Classics and Philosophy from Cambridge University and a B.Phil. and D.Phil. degree in Philosophy from Oxford University. From 1983 until 2006, she taught at the University of Connecticut, Storrs, where she was Professor of Philosophy, and became Professor Emerita. As of Fall 2006, she holds the Abraham I. Melden Chair in Moral Philosophy at the University of California, Irvine. She has been a visiting teacher and researcher at many academic institutions including Princeton University, the Institute for Advanced Study, the University of Pennsylvania, Indiana University, Wolfson College, Oxford, Technische Universität Dresden, King's College London, and the Swedish Collegium for Advanced Study in the Social Sciences, and regularly gives invited lectures in the United States, Europe, and elsewhere. Gilbert was married to philosopher Saul Kripke and is the sister of British historian Sir Martin Gilbert. In 2016, Margaret Gilbert was elected to the American Academy of Arts and Sciences. In 2019 she was awarded the Lebowitz Prize for Philosophical Achievement and Contribution by Phi Beta Kappa in conjunction with the American Philosophical Association.

== Work ==
In her book On Social Facts (1989) Gilbert presented novel accounts of a number of central social phenomena in the context of critical reflections on proposals by the founders of sociology Émile Durkheim, Georg Simmel, and Max Weber and others, including the philosopher David Lewis. The phenomena discussed include social conventions, social groups in a central sense of the term, group languages, collective belief, and acting together. Gilbert argued that these were all 'plural subject phenomena'. In a summary passage she wrote, with allusion to Rousseau, that "One is willing to be the member of a plural subject if one is willing, at least in relation to certain conditions, to put one's own will into a 'pool of wills' dedicated, as one, to a single goal (or whatever it is that the pool is dedicated to)" (p.18). If two or more people have openly expressed such willingness in relation to a particular goal, in conditions of common knowledge, then the pertinent pool of wills is set up. In other words, the people concerned constitute the plural subject of the goal. As an alternative to talking of a pool of wills Gilbert refers also to joint commitment as when she writes: "the wills of the parties are jointly committed" (p.198). In later work she has preferred the language of joint commitment. Gilbert compares the plural subject to the singular subject and argues, with allusion to Durkheim, that "In order for individual human beings to form collectivities, they must take on a special character, a 'new' character, insofar as they need not, qua human beings, have that character. Moreover, humans must form a whole or unit of a special kind...a plural subject" (p.431).

In subsequent writings Gilbert continued the development and application of her plural subject theory. Each of the essay collections Living Together (1996), Sociality and Responsibility (2000) and Marcher Ensemble (in French) (2003) is composed of relevant papers authored by Gilbert.

In her book A Theory of Political Obligation (2006; 2008) Gilbert offered a new perspective on a classical problem in political philosophy, generally known as 'the' problem of political obligation. As Gilbert makes clear in her book, there are many versions of this problem. She addresses the question whether there is something about one's being the member of a particular society that means one is obligated to uphold the political institutions of that society. Unlike most contemporary writers on the subject, she does not insist that the obligation in question is a matter of moral requirement. Gilbert argues that there are obligations of a different sort, and that these that are a function of membership in a political society construed as membership in a particular kind of plural subject constituted, as are all plural subjects, by a joint commitment.

Other topics Gilbert has addressed in one or more of her publications include agreements and promises, authority, collective emotions, collective responsibility, personal decisions and intentions, marital love, mutual recognition, patriotism, rights (in particular claim-rights), shared attention, shared values, social rules, and social unity.

Gilbert's essay collection Joint Commitment (2014) contains eighteen recent papers that together address most of the topics in the above list along with several others that Gilbert argues can be illuminated by an appeal to joint commitment.

Gilbert's book Rights and Demands (2018) is the first extended treatment of demand-rights, a class of rights that, she argues, are apt to be considered rights par excellence. To have a demand-right is to have the standing to demand an action of someone. That person is, correspondingly, obligated to the right-holder to perform the act in question. Seeking to answer the question "How are demand rights possible?" Gilbert argues for two main theses. First, joint commitment is a ground of demand-rights. Second, joint commitment may well be their only ground. In this connection Gilbert asks whether there are demand-rights whose existence can be demonstrated by moral argument without invoking a joint commitment, and finds wanting existing arguments to the effect that there are. She also argues against the possibility of accruing demand-rights through the existence of a given legal system or other institution without the involvement of a joint commitment. The final chapter of the book applies its findings to the topic of human rights.

In the course of Rights and Demands Gilbert engages with the work of central figures in contemporary rights theory such as H. L. A. Hart, Joseph Raz and Judith Thomson, and with prominent human rights theorists such as Charles Beitz and Alan Buchanan. She argues that promises and agreements - both commonly understood to ground demand-rights - are constituted by joint commitments, rejecting promise theorists' standard assumption that the obligations most closely associated with promises are a matter of moral requirement.

Gilbert's work has influenced a number of theorists outside philosophy including that of developmental psychologist Michael Tomasello.

== Selected publications ==
- On Social Facts, London, New York: Routledge, (1989, Reprinted 1992)
- Living Together: Rationality, Sociality, and Obligation, Rowman and Littlefield, Lanham, MD. (1996)
- Sociality and Responsibility: New Essays in Plural Subject Theory, Rowman and Littlefield, Lanham, MD. (2000)
- Marcher ensemble: Essais sur les fondements des phénomènes collectifs, Presses universitaires de France: Paris, France, (2003)
- A Theory of Political Obligation: Membership, Commitment, and the Bonds of Society, Oxford University Press: Oxford (2006)(2008)
- Joint Commitment: How We Make the Social World, Oxford University Press: New York (2014).
- Il Noi Collettivo: Impegno Congiunto e Mondo Sociale, Raffaelo Cortina: Milano (2015).
- Rights and Demands: A Foundational Inquiry, Oxford University Press: Oxford (2018).
- Life in Groups: How We Think, Feel, and Act Together, Oxford University Press: Oxford (2023).

== See also ==
- Collective intentionality
- Social ontology
