= Albert Simard =

French-American physician, Legion of Honour, activist

Albert Charles Joseph Simard
- Born: c. 1891; France
- Died: May 2, 1973 (aged 82); New York City
- Citizenship: French, American
- Occupation: Physician
- Known for: Activism

Albert Charles Joseph Simard [Albert C. J. Simard] (c. 1891 — May 2, 1973) was a French-American medical doctor. He was appointed to the Legion of Honour. He was also active in various professional and academic organizations before, during, and after World War II.

== Biography ==
=== Involvement in World War I, education and medical career (1914 – 1939) ===
While serving in World War I, Simard was seriously injured. The French government appointed him to the Legion of Honour (As a Chevalier de la Légion d'honneur) for his service. Dr. Simard received his medical degree from the University of Paris in 1921. In the same year, he wrote an educational test, La réaction de fixation de l'alexine: son application au diagnostic sérologique de la peste, (Eng.; Work of the Pasteur Institute in Paris, Plague Laboratory). Simard continued working at the Pasteur Institute through the early 1930s.

Simard then moved to New York around 1935 or 1936. There, Simard was an endocrinologist, as well as a gland specialist in Manhattan. He was a member of various medical associations, including: the American Geriatric Society, the Endocrine Society, the Academy-International of Medicine, the New York County Medical Society, the Medical Society of the State of New York, and the American Medical Association.

=== Involvement in World War II (1939 – 1945) ===
In 1939, Simard was elected to head the Comité des Associations Françaises de New York - USA (Eng.; French Societies of New York). That year the Second World War broke out. At the time, Simard was the medical attache of the French consulate in New York City. In an April 1940 report, he is mentioned as a French civilian relief worker. He was described by famed professor Fred G. Hoffherr as "one of the leaders of the French colony," presumably among French ex-pats in America. Simard was President of the Federation of French War Veterans of the World War. Simard was one of the founders of France Forever. This organization was founded on 29 June, 1940 in Simard's apartment. Following Charles de Gaulle's appeal on 18 June 1940, on 29 June, Simard called a public meeting to launch a support movement, stating: "We are convinced that France and all enslaved European democracies can be freed only by British victory and that a German victory over Britain will be the signal for an attack on all of the Americas."

In the November 1940 protest against Vichy anti-Jewish legislation, as vice president of France Forever, he addressed the rally, reading a message of support de Gaulle had sent. Following Richard de Rochemont, Simard would later serve as the President and Executive Committee Chairman of France Forever. On 15 January 1942, at the Red Cross, during a special observance of foreign nations and people, Simard represented France. At the Allied Day event, he "spoke on the goal of the Free French Movement," and for the Red Cross.

=== Later life and death (1946 – 1973) ===
Simard would later become involved with the Society for the Prevention of World War III, serving as its Secretary. In March 1946, Simard reviewed Erich Maria Remarque's Arch of Triumph in Free World. On October 9, 1946, an exhibit "France Comes Back" opened in New York in the Museum of Natural History, created partially by Simard. Author-Historian Gilbert Chinard was also involved in the exhibit.

In the 1950s, Simard was also active in the Union for the Protection of the Human Person, founded by Boris Gourevitch. In 1955, he wrote an introductory forward on Gourevitch's life in Gourevitch's book, The Road to Peace and to Moral Democracy: An Encyclopedia of Peace. The first annual French-American Friendship Dinner was held on 29 April 1956 at Waldorf-Astoria, with 300 guests present. Simard was chairman of the dinner committee and one of its speakers.

Dr. Simard died in New York, on 2 May 1973, at the age of 82.
