= Frederik Jacobus Johannes Buytendijk =

Dutch anthropologist, biologist and psychologist

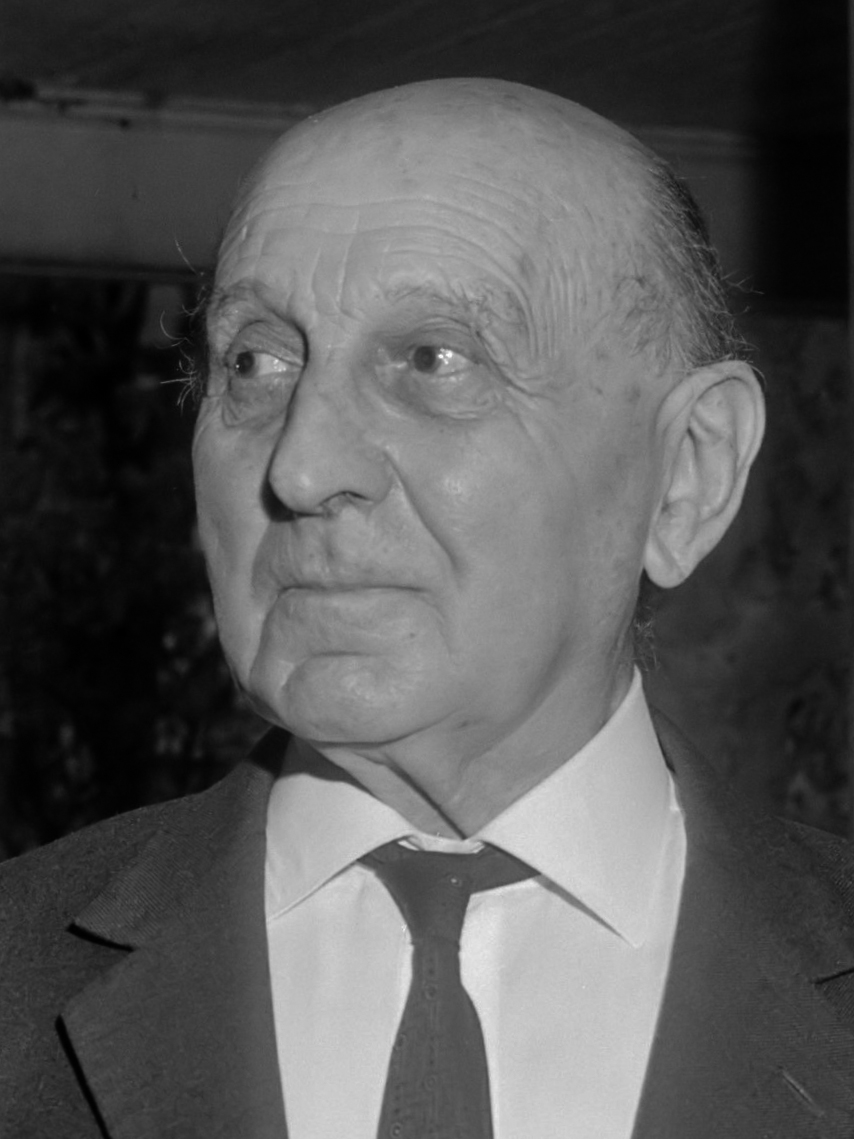

Frederik Jacobus Johannes Buytendijk (April 29, 1887, Breda – October 21, 1974, Nijmegen) was a Dutch anthropologist, biologist and psychologist.

== Biography ==
Buytendijk was an only child of a mathematics teacher and was raised in the Dutch Reformed faith; during his childhood, he collected plants and butterflies as well as keeping an aquarium. He studied medicine at the University of Amsterdam and graduated on October 21, 1909; he gained his doctorate in medicine from the University of Utrecht in 1918, with a dissertation entitled Experiments on Habit Formation in Animals.

He was a lecturer in biology and general physiology at the VU University Amsterdam and received a chair in physiology there in 1919. In 1924 he became professor of physiology and histology in Groningen. From 1946 until his retirement in 1957, he was an extraordinary professor in Nijmegen and professor of psychology in Utrecht, although he had never studied psychology.

In his younger years, acquaintance with Max Scheler, Hans Driesch and Helmuth Plessner (with whom he became friends) had a considerable influence on Buytendijk. He corresponded with many great philosophers, such as Binswanger, Guardini, Merleau-Ponty, Sartre and de Beauvoir. Buytendijk got his inspiration and method from different sources: the experiences he had since 1918 as an animal psychologist, and after the Second World War as a human psychologist, and from phenomenology, the doctrine that makes the phenomena speak for themselves. In his General Theory of Human Posture and Movement (1949), Buytendijk succeeded in emphasizing a combination of body and mind.

He supported the ideas of Montessori education.

In 1935, he authored The Mind of the Dog, a book on canine intelligence that featured his own tests on dog senses.

In 1937 the originally Reformed Buytendijk became a Catholic; his motto became “Consider to the lilies of the field” (Matthew 6:28, Luke, 12:27).

During WWII, he spoke against racism and was interned in Haaren from July to October 1942.

He was, among other things, chairman of the Catholic Association for Mental Health and from the end of the 1950s he was editor-in-chief of the Aula series, the popular scientific paperback series of publishing house Het Spectrum. He published numerous books and articles, such as De Vrouw in 1951.

== Family ==
In 1919 he married Henriëtte Wilhelmina van Bemmel; they had four children.

== Books ==
His publications include:

- De Vrouw (1951)
- De Psychologie van de Roman (1962)
- Prolegomena to an Anthropological Physiology (Pittsburgh, 1974)
- Algemene theorie der menselijke houding en beweging
- De wijsheid der mieren
- The Essence and Meaning of Games
- L’homme et L’animal; Essai de Psychologie Comparee (idees)
- De rede van het hart
- Mensch und Tier
- Mier en Slang: Correspondentie van F.J.J. Buytendijk met Erich Wasmann S.J.
- Begegnung der Geschlechter
- A gênese psicológica do espírito materno: F. J. J. Buytendijk (1960)". REVISTA DA ABORDAGEM GESTÁLTICA, v. 23, p. 111-120, 2017. Tradução de Claudinei Aparecido de Freitas da Silva. Acesso: https://pepsic.bvsalud.org/scielo.php?script=sci_arttext&pid=S1809-68672017000100012&lng=pt&nrm=iso&tlng=pt
