= Philosophical anthropology =

Branch of anthropology and philosophy

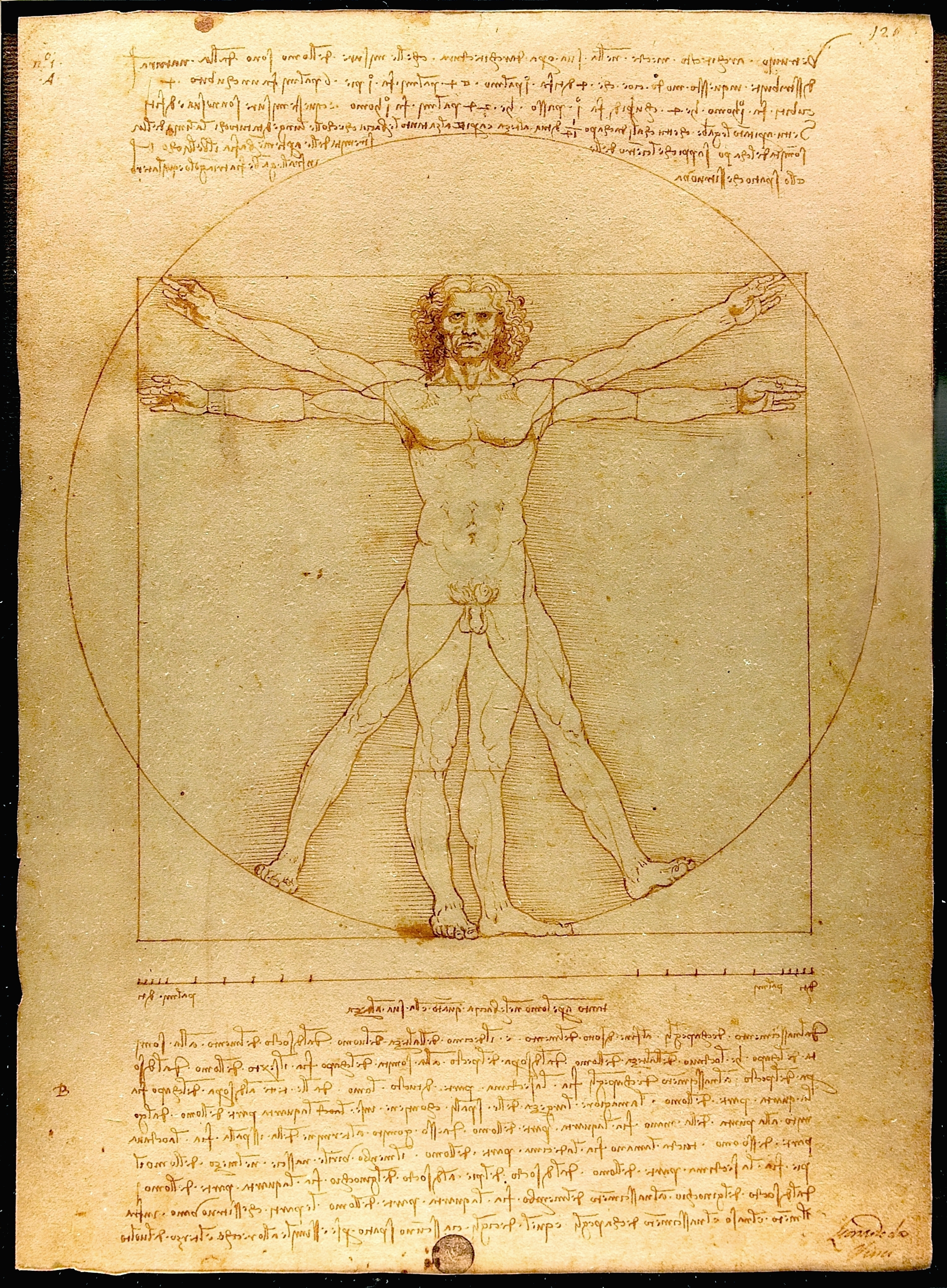
Vitruvian Man or the perfect man by Leonardo da Vinci

Philosophical anthropology, sometimes called anthropological philosophy, is a discipline within philosophy that inquires into the essence of human nature. It deals with questions of metaphysics and phenomenology of the human person.

Philosophical anthropology is distinct from philosophy of anthropology, the study of the philosophical conceptions underlying anthropological work.

== History ==
Plato identified the human essence with the soul, affirming that the material body is its prison from which the soul yearns for to be liberated because it wants to see, know and contemplate the pure hyperuranic ideas. According to the Phaedrus, after death, souls transmigrate from a body to another. Therefore Plato introduced an irreducible mind–body dualism.

Aristotle defined man as a living substance that is the union of body and soul, in a relationship where the body is matter and soul is immanent form within the so called theory of hylomorphism. Man is a type of animal with a specific characteristic that makes him superior to other animals: rationality. The soul is not something of extraneous to the body, but it is the principle that organizes, structures, gives life and form to the body's matter. The Aristotelian soul's conception is described in the treaty On the Soul from a theoretical point of view, and in the Politics and Nicomachean Ethics from a practical one.

Christian thought developed the concept of creatio ex nihilo according to which all what exists is a contingent creature of God, including matter. The Platonic khôra ended to be a region out of the Logos' power.

Time started to be conceived within a linear and not yet a cyclic becoming.

Christianity also developed the notion of person in order to explain the Most Holy Trinity and the co-existence of the human and divine nature (essence) in the unique person of Christ.

=== Ancient Christian writers: Augustine of Hippo ===
Augustine of Hippo was an early Christian author with an anthropological vision, although it is not clear if he had any influence on Max Scheler, the founder of philosophical anthropology as an independent discipline, nor on any of the major philosophers that followed him. Augustine has been cited by Husserl and Heidegger as one of the early writers to inquire on time-consciousness and the role of seeing in the feeling of "Being-in-the-world".

Augustine saw the human being as a perfect unity of two substances: soul and body. He was much closer in this anthropological view to Aristotle than to Plato. In his late treatise On Care to Be Had for the Dead sec. 5 (420 AD) he insisted that the body is essential part of the human person:

In no wise are the bodies themselves to be spurned. (...) For these pertain not to ornament or aid which is applied from without, but to the very nature of man.

Augustine's favourite figure to describe body-soul unity is marriage: caro tua, coniux tua – your body is your wife. Initially, the two elements were in perfect harmony. After the fall of humanity they are now experiencing dramatic combat between one another.

They are two categorically different things: the body is a three-dimensional object composed of the four elements, whereas the soul has no spatial dimensions. Soul is a kind of substance, participating in reason, fit for ruling the body. To be a human is to be a composite of soul and body, and that the soul is superior to the body. The latter statement is grounded in his hierarchical classification of things into those that merely exist, those that exist and live, and those that exist, live, and have intelligence or reason.

According to N. Blasquez, Augustine's dualism of substances of the body and soul doesn't stop him from seeing the unity of body and soul as a substance itself. Following Aristotle and other ancient philosophers, he defined man as a rational mortal animal – animal rationale mortale. Augustine also believed in the otherworldly Life of the soul and in the final resurrection of the flesh.

=== Modern period ===
Philosophical anthropology as a kind of thought, before it was founded as a distinct philosophical discipline in the 1920s, emerged as post-medieval thought striving for emancipation from Christian religion and Aristotelic tradition. The origin of this liberation, characteristic of modernity, has been the Cartesian skepticism formulated by Descartes in the first two of his Meditations on First Philosophy (1641).

Immanuel Kant (1724–1804) was a notable early lecturer on the subject of anthropology in the European academic world and contributor to its development as a separate discipline, breaking with the German philosophical tradition of what was up to that point referred to as "anthropology" as a subject (although he was not, contrary to some accounts, the first to offer a class the title of "anthropology"). Kant lectured on anthropology for more than 20 years at the University of Königsberg, starting in the winter semester of 1772-73. He specifically developed a conception of pragmatic anthropology, according to which the human being is studied as a free agent. At the same time, he conceived of his anthropology as an empirical, not a strictly philosophical discipline. Both his philosophical and his anthropological work has been one of the influences in the field during the 19th and 20th century. After Kant, Ludwig Feuerbach is sometimes considered the next most important influence and founder of anthropological philosophy.

During the 19th century, an important contribution came from post-Kantian German idealists like Fichte, Schelling and Hegel, as well from Søren Kierkegaard.

=== Philosophical anthropology as independent discipline ===
Since its development in the 1920s, in the milieu of Germany Weimar culture, philosophical anthropology has been turned into a philosophical discipline, competing with the other traditional sub-disciplines of philosophy such as epistemology, ethics, metaphysics, logic, and aesthetics. It is the attempt to unify disparate ways of understanding behaviour of humans as both creatures of their social environments and creators of their own values. Although the majority of philosophers throughout the history of philosophy can be said to have a distinctive "anthropology" that undergirds their thought, philosophical anthropology itself, as a specific discipline in philosophy, arose within the later modern period as an outgrowth from developing methods in philosophy, such as phenomenology and existentialism. The former, which draws its energy from methodical reflection on human experience (first person perspective) as from the philosopher's own personal experience, naturally aided the emergence of philosophical explorations of human nature and the human condition.

=== 1920s Germany ===
Max Scheler, from 1900 until 1920 had been a follower of Husserl's phenomenology, the hegemonic form of philosophy in Germany at the time. Scheler sought to apply Husserl's phenomenological approach to different topics. From 1920 Scheler laid the foundation for philosophical anthropology as a philosophical discipline, competing with phenomenology and other philosophic disciplines. Husserl and Martin Heidegger (1889–1976), were the two most authoritative philosophers in Germany at the time, and their criticism of philosophical anthropology and Scheler have had a major impact on the discipline.

Scheler defined the human being not so much as a "rational animal" (as has traditionally been the case since Aristotle) but essentially as a "loving being". He breaks down the traditional hylomorphic conception of the human person, and describes the personal being with a tripartite structure of lived body, soul, and spirit. Love and hatred are not psychological emotions, but spiritual, intentional acts of the person, which he categorises as "intentional feelings." Scheler based his philosophical anthropology in a Christian metaphysics of the spirit. Helmuth Plessner would later emancipate philosophical anthropology from Christianity.

Helmuth Plessner and Arnold Gehlen have been influenced by Scheler, and they are the three major representatives of philosophical anthropology as a movement.

=== From the 1940s ===
Ernst Cassirer, a neo-Kantian philosopher, was the most influential source for the definition and development of the field from the 1940s until the 1960s. Particularly influential has been Cassirer's description of man as a symbolic animal, which has been reprised in the 1960s by Gilbert Durand, scholar of symbolic anthropology and the imaginary.

In 1953, future pope Karol Wojtyla based his dissertation thesis on Max Scheler, limiting himself to the works Scheler wrote before rejecting Catholicism and the Judeo-Christian tradition in 1920. Wojtyla used Scheler as an example that phenomenology could be reconciled with Catholicism. Some authors have argued that Wojtyla influenced philosophical anthropology. (Note: K. Wojtyla's anthropological works: K. Wojtyla (1993). Love and Responsibility. San Francisco: Ignatius Press. ISBN 0-89870-445-6.; K. Wojtyla (1979). The Acting Person: A Contribution To Phenomenological Anthropology. Springer. ISBN 90-277-0969-6.)

In the 20th century, other important contributors and influences to philosophical anthropology were Joseph Maréchal (1878–1944), Paul Häberlin (1878–1960), Martin Buber (1878–1965), E.R. Dodds (1893–1979), Hans-Georg Gadamer (1900–2002), Eric Voegelin (1901–85), Hans Jonas (1903–93), Josef Pieper (1904–97), Hans-Eduard Hengstenberg (1904–1998), Jean-Paul Sartre (1905–80), Maurice Merleau-Ponty (1908–61), Paul Ricoeur (1913–2005), Emerich Coreth (1919–2006), Hans Blumenberg (1920-1996), René Girard (1923–2015), Leonardo Polo (1926–2013), Alasdair MacIntyre (1929–2025), Pierre Bourdieu (1930–2002), Jacques Derrida (1930–2004) and P. M. S. Hacker (1939- ).

== Anthropology of interpersonal relationships ==
A large focus of philosophical anthropology is also interpersonal relationships, as an attempt to unify disparate ways of understanding the behaviour of humans as both creatures of their social environments and creators of their own values. It analyses also the ontology that is in play in human relationships – of which intersubjectivity is a major theme. Intersubjectivity is the study of how two individuals, subjects, whose experiences and interpretations of the world are radically different understand and relate to each other.

Recently anthropology has begun to shift towards studies of intersubjectivity and other existential/phenomenological themes. Studies of language have also gained new prominence in philosophy and sociology due to language's close ties with the question of intersubjectivity.

=== Michael D. Jackson's study of intersubjectivity ===
The academic Michael D. Jackson is another important philosophical anthropologist. His research and fieldwork concentrate on existential themes of "being in the world" (Dasein) as well as interpersonal relationships. His methodology challenges traditional anthropology due to its focus on first-person experience. In his most well known book, Minima Ethnographica which focuses on intersubjectivity and interpersonal relationships, he draws upon his ethnographic fieldwork in order to explore existential theory.

In his latest book, Existential Anthropology, he explores the notion of control, stating that humans anthropomorphize inanimate objects around them in order to enter into an interpersonal relationship with them. In this way humans are able to feel as if they have control over situations that they cannot control because rather than treating the object as an object, they treat it as if it is a rational being capable of understanding their feelings and language. Good examples are prayer to gods to alleviate drought or to help a sick person or cursing at a computer that has ceased to function.

=== P. M. S. Hacker's study of human nature ===
A foremost Wittgensteinian, P. M. S. Hacker has recently completed a tetralogy in philosophical anthropology, of which he writes:

"The first was Human Nature: The Categorical Framework (2007), which provided the stage set. The second was The Intellectual Powers: A Study of Human Nature (2013), which began the play with the presentation of the intellect and its courtiers. The third The Passions: A Study of Human Nature (2017), which introduced the drama of the passions and the emotions. The fourth and final volume, The Moral Powers: A Study of Human Nature (2020), turns to the moral powers and the will, to good and evil, to pleasure and happiness, to what gives meaning to our lives, and the place of death in our lives. This tetralogy constitutes a Summa Anthropologica in as much as it presents a systematic categorical overview of our thought and talk of human nature, ranging from substance, power, and causation to good and evil and the meaning of life. A sine qua non of any philosophical investigation, according to Grice, is a synopsis of the relevant logico-linguistic grammar. It is surely unreasonable that each generation should have to amass afresh these grammatical norms of conceptual exclusion, implication, compatibility, and contextual presupposition, as well as tense and person anomalies and asymmetries. So via the tetralogy I have attempted to provide a compendium of usage of the pertinent categories in philosophical anthropology to assist others in their travels through these landscapes."

== See also ==
- Antihumanism (opposite)
- Ernst Tugendhat (2007) Anthropologie statt Metaphysik
- Introduction to Kant's Anthropology
- Martin Buber
- Völkerpsychologie

== Bibliography ==
- Agaësse, Paul SJ (2004). L'anthropologie chrétienne selon saint Augustin : image, liberté, péché et grâce. Paris: Médiasèvres. p. 197. ISBN 2-900388-68-6.
- Azurmendi, Joxe (1997). Gizakiaren filosofia ilustratutik antropologia filosofikora. Donostia: Jakin. p. 132. ISBN 84-922537-4-6.
- Blasquez, N, El concepto del substantia segun san Agustin, "Augustinus" 14 (1969), pp. 305–350; 15 (1970), pp. 369–383; 16 (1971), pp. 69–79.
- Cassirer, Ernst (1944) An Essay on Man
- Couturier Charles SJ, (1954) La structure métaphysique de l'homme d'après saint Augustin, in: Augustinus Magister, Congrès International Augustinien. Communications, Paris, vol. 1, pp. 543–550
- Donceel, Joseph F., Philosophical Anthropology, New York: Sheed&Ward 1967.
- Gilson, Étienne, (1955) History of Christian Philosophy in the Middle Ages, (2nd ed., reprinted 1985), London: Sheed & Ward, pp. 829, ISBN 0-7220-4114-4.
- Fischer, Joachim (2006) Der Identitätskern der Philosophischen Anthropologie (Scheler, Plessner, Gehlen) in Krüger, Hans-Peter and Lindemann, Gesa (2006) Philosophische Anthropologie im 21. Jahrhundert
- Fikentscher, Wolfgang (2004) Modes of thought: a study in the anthropology of law and religion
- Gianni, A., (1965) Il problema antropologico, Roma .
- Hendrics, E. (1954) Platonisches und Biblisches Denken bei Augustinus, in: Augustinus Magister, Congrès International Augustinien. Communications, Paris, vol. 1.
- Karpp, Heinrich (1950). Probleme altchristlicher Anthropologie. Biblische Anthropologie und philosophische Psychologie bei den Kirchen-vatern des dritten Jahrhunderts. Gütersloh: G. Bertelsmann Verlag.
- Lucas Lucas, Ramon, Man Incarnate Spirit, a Philosophy of Man Compendium, USA: Circle Press, 2005.
- Mann, W.E., Inner-Life Ethics, in:The Augustinian Tradition. Philosophical Traditions. G. B. Matthews (ed.). Berkeley-Los Angeles-London: University of California Press. 1999. pp. 138–152. ISBN 0-520-20999-0.
- Masutti, Egidio, (1989), Il problema del corpo in San Agostino, Roma: Borla, p. 230, ISBN 88-263-0701-6
- Mondin, Battista, Philosophical Anthropology, Man: an Impossible Project?, Rome: Urbaniana University Press, 1991.
- Pulina Giuseppe, Dizionario di antropologia filosofica, Diogene Multimedia, Bologna 2022.
- Thomas Sturm, Kant und die Wissenschaften vom Menschen. Paderborn: Mentis, 2009. ISBN 3897856085, 9783897856080
- Jesús Padilla Gálvez, Philosophical Anthropology. Wittgenstein’s Perspective. Berlin, De Gruyter, 2010. ISBN 9783110321555 Review
