= Simmel =

Simmel is a German language surname. It may refer to:

- Ernst Simmel (1882–1947), German psychologist
- Friedrich Simmel (born 1970), German biophysicist
- Georg Simmel (1858–1918), German sociologist
- Johannes Mario Simmel (1924–2009), Austrian writer
- Marianne Simmel (1923–2010), American psychologist
