= Michael Bratman =

American philosopher

- Born: July 25, 1945 (age 81)

Education
- Education: Rockefeller University

Philosophical work
- Era: Contemporary philosophy
- Region: Western philosophy
- Doctoral students: Mark Davis
- Main interests: Philosophy of action, moral philosophy
- Notable ideas: Intentionality as planning

Michael E. Bratman (born July 25, 1945) is an American philosopher who is Durfee Professor in the School of Humanities & Sciences and Professor of Philosophy at Stanford University.

== Education and career ==
Bratman graduated from Haverford College in 1967 and earned his Ph.D. in philosophy at Rockefeller University in 1974, where he worked with Donald Davidson. He joined the faculty at Stanford University in 1974, where he has taught ever since.

He was elected a Fellow of the American Academy of Arts and Sciences in 2012. In 2014, Oxford University Press published a collection of essays on Bratman's work by colleagues and former students, Rational and Social Agency: The Philosophy of Michael Bratman. A review in Notre Dame Philosophical Reviews remarked that, "Our very understanding of what it is to form a plan or shared intention is owed in no small part to Michael Bratman's massively influential body of work."

== Philosophical work ==
Bratman works in philosophy of action and moral philosophy and is best known for his development of the idea that "intention is a distinctive practical attitude marked by its pivotal role in planning for the future." His work in those areas led him to the Belief-Desire-Intention model that is used in many areas, including artificial intelligence, today. Bratman's theory of intentions as plans has also led to a distinctive and widely discussed account of "collective intentionality."

== Selected bibliography ==
- Bratman, M. E. (1999) [1987]. Intention, Plans, and Practical Reason. CSLI Publications. ISBN 1-57586-192-5. Archived from the original on August 30, 2006.
- Bratman, M. E. (1999). Faces of Intention. Cambridge University Press. ISBN 0521631319. 978-0-521-63131-0.
