= Collective intentionality =

Social concept in philosophy of mind

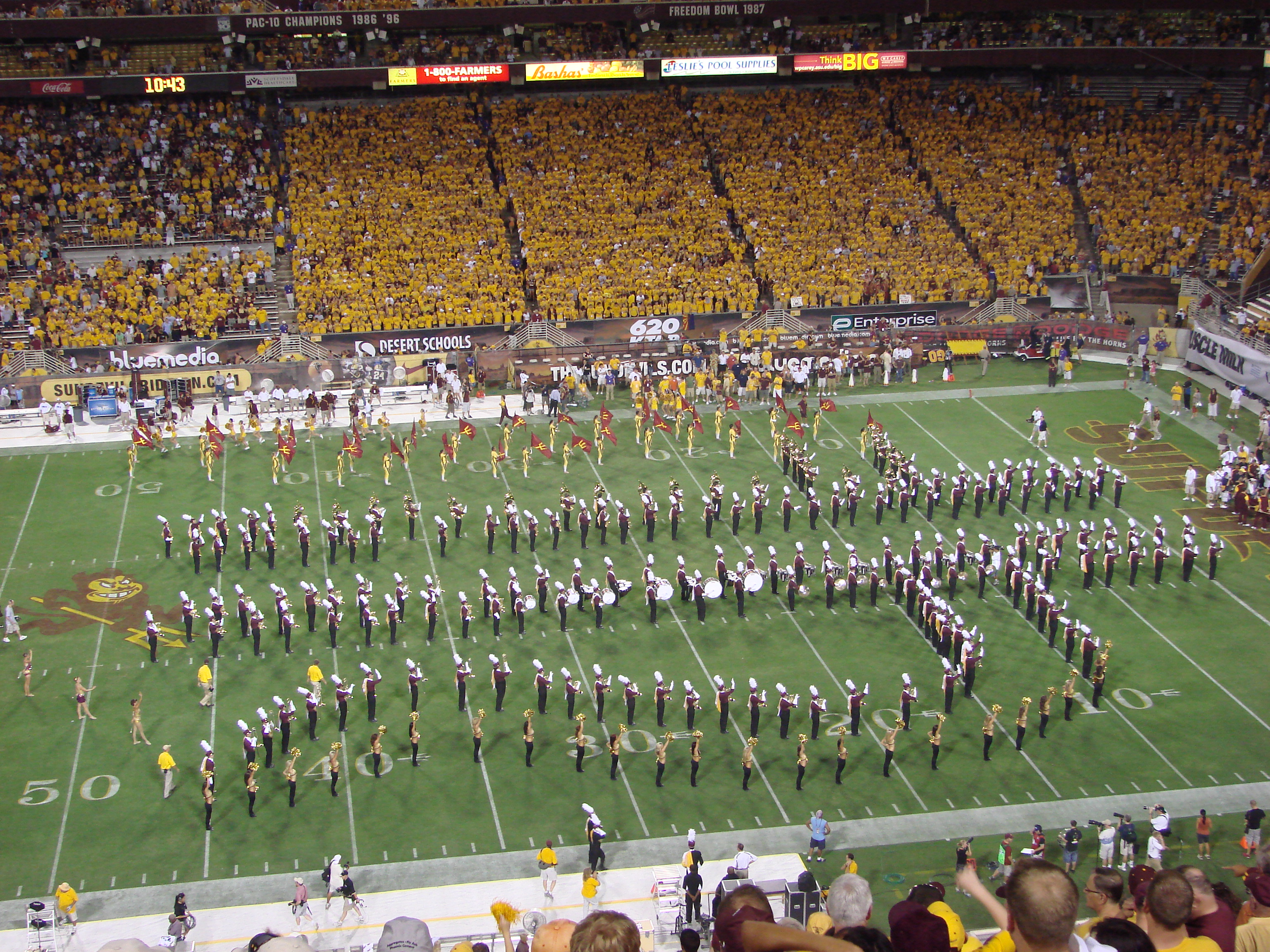
Collective intentionality demonstrated in a human formation

In the philosophy of mind, collective intentionality characterizes the intentionality that occurs when two or more individuals undertake a task together. Examples include two individuals carrying a heavy table up a flight of stairs or dancing a tango.

This phenomenon is approached from psychological and normative perspectives, among others. Prominent philosophers working in the psychological manner are Raimo Tuomela, Kaarlo Miller, John R. Searle, and Michael E. Bratman. Margaret Gilbert takes a normative approach dealing specifically with group formation. David Velleman is also concerned with how groups are formed, but his account lacks the normative element present in Gilbert.

The notion that collectives are capable of forming intentions can be found, whether implicitly or explicitly, in literature going back thousands of years. For example, ancient texts such as Plato's Republic discuss the cooperative determination of laws and social order by the group composed of society as a whole. This theme was later expanded into social contract theory by Enlightenment-era philosophers such as Thomas Hobbes and John Locke. In the 20th century, the likes of Wilfrid Sellars and Anthony Quinton noted the existence of "We-Intentions" amid broader discussion of the concept of intentionality, and thus laid the groundwork for the focused philosophical analysis of collective intentionality that began in the late 1980s.

This philosophical notion is closely related to the psychological construct of Shared intentionality. The critical difference between the two is that Collective intentionality implies aware intentions that occur when two or more individuals undertake a task together. In contrast, the term Shared intentionality describes unaware processes in mother-child dyads during social learning when very young organisms only manifest simple reflexes and do not possess abstract thinking. This difference between the two terms may mean two different neurophysiological processes underlying their appearance.

== Raimo Tuomela and Kaarlo Miller ==
Contemporary philosophical discussion of collective intentionality was initiated by Raimo Tuomela and Kaarlo Miller's "We-Intentions". In this paper, Tuomela and Miller assert three conditions necessary for a collective intention, highlighting the importance of beliefs among the agents of the group. After citing examples that are commonly accepted as requiring more than one member to participate (carrying a table upstairs, playing tennis, toasting to a friend, conversing, etc.), they state their criteria:

A member (A) of a collective (G) we-intends to do a group action (X) if and only if:

1) (A) intends to do their part of X
2) (A) believes that accomplishing X is possible, and that all members of G intend to do their part towards accomplishing X
3) (A) believes that all the members of G also believe that accomplishing X is possible.

To illustrate this idea, imagine Anne and Bob intend to carry a table (that is far too heavy for one person to carry) upstairs. In order for this action to qualify as a we-intention, Anne first needs to intend to do her part in carrying the table. Next, Anne needs to believe that carrying the table upstairs is possible, and that Bob intends to do his part in carrying. Finally, Anne needs to believe that Bob also believes that carrying the table upstairs is possible. If all of these conditions are met, then Anne and Bob have collective intentions under Tuomela and Miller's criteria.

== John Searle ==
John Searle's 1990 paper, "Collective Intentions and Actions" offers another interpretation of collective action. In contrast to Tuomela and Miller, Searle claims that collective intentionality is a "primitive phenomenon, which cannot be analyzed as the summation of individual intentional behavior". He exemplifies the fundamental distinction between "I-intentions" and "We-intentions" by comparing the hypothetical case of a set of picnickers and a dance troupe. During a rainstorm, each picnicker spontaneously runs for cover. On the other hand, the members of the dance troupe run for cover as part of a preconceived routine. Searle claims that the picnickers, whose intentions are individually oriented and simply happen to coincide, do not display collective intentionality, while members of the dance troupe do, because they deliberately cooperate with one another.

Searle's rebuttal to Tuomela and Miller's account begins with a counterexample involving a group of business school graduates who intend to pursue their own selfish interests, but believe that by doing so, they will indirectly serve humanity. These young businessmen believe that their fellow graduates will do likewise, but do not actively cooperate with one another in pursuing their goals. Searle holds that this example fulfills all of Tuomela and Miller's criteria for collective intentionality. However, he claims that collective intentionality does not actually exist in such a situation unless the graduates have organized and formed an explicit pact with one another to serve humanity through self-interested action.

He proceeds to specify two criteria that must be satisfied by any proper account of collective intentionality:

(1) It "must be consistent with the fact that society consists of nothing but individuals."
(2) It must take into account that any individual's intentions are independent of "the fact of whether or not he is getting things right."

Although a "we-intention" is always held by an individual, it must make fundamental reference to a collective formed in conjunction with the other individual(s). For instance, two individuals who, while sharing the labor of hollandaise-sauce production, each believe the proposition "We are making hollandaise sauce", have formed a collective intention. This would not exist if they only held beliefs to the effect of "I am stirring", or "I am pouring". It is thus, Searle claims, that collective intentionality is not reducible to individual intentionality.

== Michael Bratman ==
Michael Bratman's 1992 paper "Shared Cooperative Activity", contends that shared cooperative activity (SCA) can be reduced to "I-intentions". In other words, just as an individual can plan to act by themself, that same individual can also plan for a group to act. With this in mind, he presents three characteristics of shared cooperative activity:

(1) Each participant must be mutually responsive to the intentions and actions of the others,
(2) The participants must each be committed to the joint activity,
(3) The participants must each be committed to supporting the efforts of the others.

One aspect of Bratman's argument that supports these criteria is the idea of meshing subplans. Bratman claims that in a shared cooperative activity, individuals' secondary plans do not need to be the same, but they cannot conflict. For example, consider his example of two people who intend to paint a house together. Let us call these two people Alice and Bill. Suppose Alice wants to paint the house red and Bill wants to paint the house blue. Both are aware that their subplans conflict, and that the other is aware of it as well. Bratman argues that even if Alice and Bill do end up painting the house together, they do not have a shared cooperative activity, because their subplans are in conflict. Furthermore, each participant must also be committed to having subplans that mesh. Without this commitment, participants might disregard others' subplans, leading to a lack of cooperation. However, he additionally claims that their subplans need not be identical. For instance, suppose Alice wants to use an inexpensive paint and Bill wants paint from a specific hardware store. In this case, there is a way that both subplans can be achieved: they could buy an inexpensive paint from Bill's store of choice. The details of Bratman's view are as follows:

For a cooperatively neutral action, our doing an action J is an SCA if and only if:

1) We do J (in a way that could involve cooperation, but does not have to)
2) It is common knowledge between us that we are both committed to meshing subplans and
3) (B) leads to (A) by way of mutual responsiveness (in the pursuit of completing our action) of intention and in action.

=== Responses to Bratman ===
One work associated with Bratman is Facundo Alonso's "Shared Intention, Reliance, and Interpersonal Obligations". Alonso contends that shared intention is a basis for interpersonal obligation. He begins the paper by asserting characteristics of joint action, which do not include multiple agents acting individually or factors of body movements, but instead are shared or collective intentions to act. Alonso distinguishes the normative theory supplied by Gilbert and the descriptive theory supplied by Bratman. Whereas Bratman focuses on intents, Alonso is also careful to point out Tuomela and Miller's focus on action to describe the roots of joint action. Alonso attempts to compromise both views by taking a path where joint action is not necessarily a normative or descriptive case. He argues for a system built off Bratman's that can take place in a descriptive nature addressed by Margaret Gilbert.

Stephen Butterfill offers another response to Bratman's view. He argues that Bratman's account is unable to explain simple interactions between agents. For example, Butterfill states that Bratman cannot explain cooperative actions between very young children, who do not yet have an understanding of other minds.

== Margaret Gilbert ==
Whereas Bratman argues for a descriptive account of collective intentionality, other authors have taken a normative approach. Margaret Gilbert in "Walking Together: A Paradigmatic Social Phenomena", sets the conditions for people entering, enduring, and exiting acts of collective intentionality. Gilbert asserts that social groups in general can be defined by something as simple as two people walking together. In her analysis the basic conditions for collective intentions that must be satisfied are as follows:

(1) People must know they are entering into an agreement by communicating it clearly (even if they are coerced). Gilbert states that this act of agreement is sufficient to set a goal for a group. Furthermore, the agreement groups the agents who comprise the group into a plural subject.
(2) The agreement implies that each member is obligated to completing the final goal.
(3) Because of this implied obligation, any and all members may rebuke any one else who fails to do their part towards the completion of the goal. The "right to rebuke" is stated as a necessary feature of the group arrangement. This functions as a tool for each member of the group to ensure the goal is accomplished.
(4) In order to break the agreement there has to be joint consent among all members of the group.

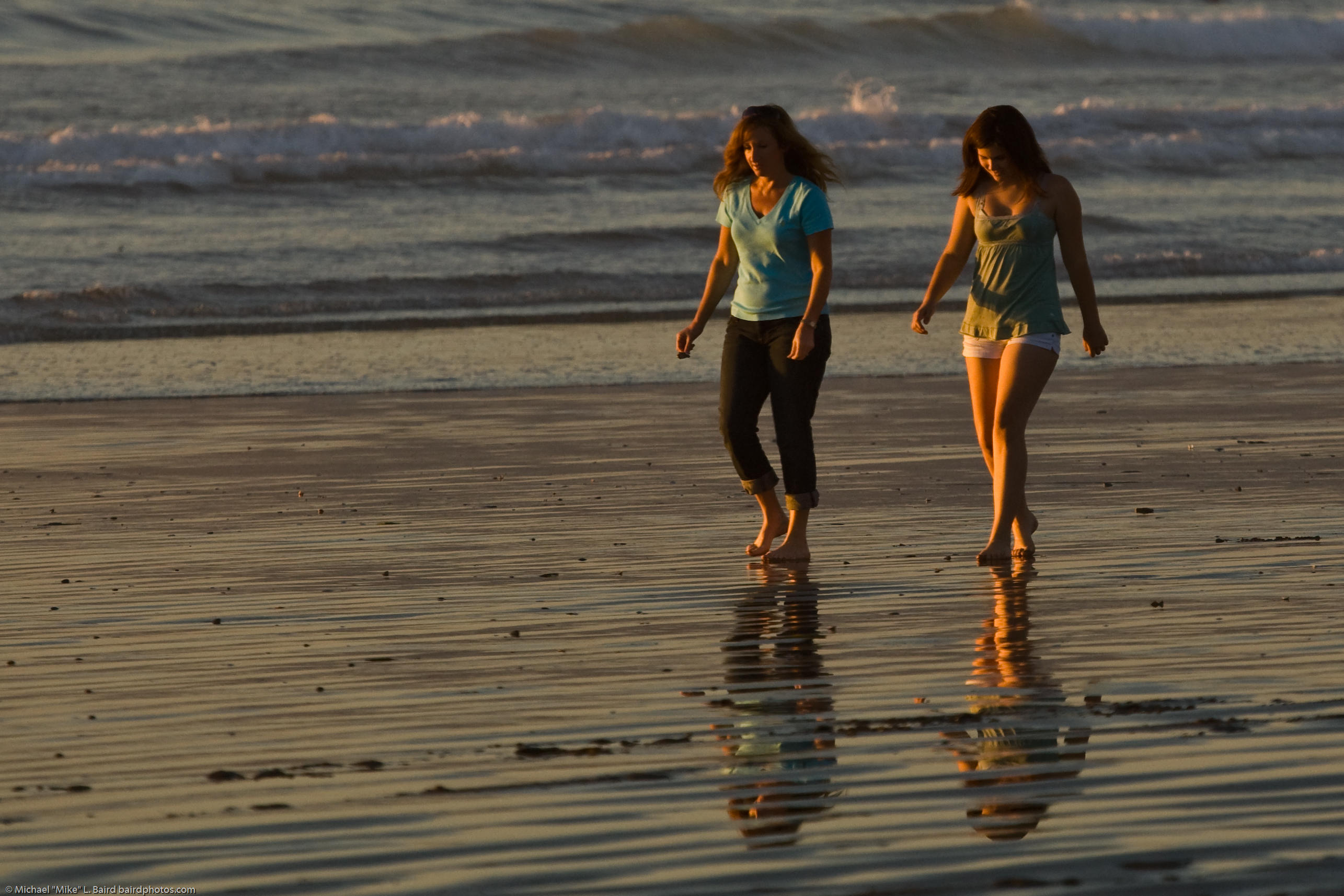
A paradigmatic social phenomenon: two people walking together

=== Responses to Gilbert ===
A number of philosophers have responded to the normative theory of Gilbert with papers that consider obligations, promises and commitments. One of these, Christopher McMahon, argues that Gilbert has observed crucial behavioral phenomena involved in acts of collective intentionality, but has misidentified the psychological dynamics underlying these phenomena. Specifically, he holds that the behaviors characterizing collective intentionality arise not from a set of mutual obligations which facilitate a "right to rebuke" but from the existence of de facto authority, or some kind of social decision-making process. This de facto authority gives one party a right to partially determine another's intentions.

Facundo M. Alonso sets conditions for how the normative phenomenon of shared intention can arise. Alonso claims that shared intention involves mutual reliance between participants. He further argues for a cognitive requirement that each member publicly intends the joint activity. Thus, Alonso states, "[R]elations of mutual reliance generate...interpersonal obligations between the participants". As a result, shared intentions generate normative promises that are enforced by mutual reliance and relevant obligation.

A. S. Roth offers his own modifications to Gilbert's account of intentionality. He, too, relies on a normative notion to explain collective intentions. Rather than obligations, however, Roth is interested in commitments. Roth enumerates four different types of commitment: participatory, contralateral, executive, and ipsilateral commitments. Roth claims that the contralateral commitments are necessary for joint actions to occur, and that they may have a moral component (though not necessarily). This opposes Gilbert's claim that the obligations found in joint activity have no moral component.

Christopher Kutz's work "Acting Together" contests the basis for what is considered a group. When speaking of a group, it becomes common to say "they" did whatever action the group is seen as doing. However, Kutz explains that each person may have varying levels of involvement in their group or their group efforts. He also questions what obligations each member is considered to have to the group and what binds those individuals to their group. To illustrate his objections, Kutz describes two group types: executive and participatory. An "executive" commitment would extend to those members of a group who participate with others of a group only superficially but still carry the name of the group as a title. This includes people working in an office or an assembly line. A "participatory" group is involved directly with the process and end results of an action. Each member is assumed to have at least some knowledge of all of the plans and sub-plans for the actions taken by the group. This opens Kutz to a discussion about who, within the group, may be considered responsible for the actions of the group.

== J. David Velleman ==
J. David Velleman provides a reaction to Gilbert as well as Searle. Velleman is concerned with explaining how a group is capable of making a decision, or, as he puts it, "how... several different minds (can) submit themselves to a single making up". To that end, he picks up Gilbert's notion of the 'pool of wills', that is, "a single will forged from the wills of different individuals". However, according to Velleman, Gilbert does not explain how such a thing can be formed. To solve this problem, he turns to a portion of Searle's theory of intentions, namely that an "intention is a mental representation that causes behavior by representing itself as causing it".

Velleman explains that, since a representation is capable of causing behavior, and speech acts are a form of representation, it is possible for a speech act to cause a behavior. That is, saying a thing can cause one to do that thing. Thus, a speech act can, in itself, be an intention. This is critical for him to make the case that an agent, having made a decision or an intending speech act, can "remain decided". In other words, that agent can continue to intend after the speech act has been accomplished. With this, Velleman shows how an agent can make a decision for a group. If an agent utters a conditional intention, and another agent utters an intention that fulfills the conditions present in the previous utterance, then the second agent has effectively decided the question for the first agent. Thus, a single collective will has been formed from multiple individual wills.

Therefore, Velleman argues that collective intention is not the summation of multiple individual intentions, but rather one shared intention. This is accomplished by perceiving intentions as existing outside the mind of an individual and within a verbal statement. The verbal statements have causal power because of the desire to not speak falsely.

== Natalie Gold and Robert Sugden ==
Collective intentionality has also been approached in light of economic theories, including game theory. According to Natalie Gold and Robert Sugden, efforts to define collective intentions as individual intentions and related beliefs (such as those of Tuomela & Miller and Michael Bratman) fail because they allow obviously non-cooperative actions to be counted as cooperative. For example, in many simple games analyzed by game theory, the players are counted as acting jointly when they achieve the Nash equilibrium, even though that equilibrium state is neither optimal nor achieved cooperatively. In the prisoner's dilemma, the Nash equilibrium occurs when each player defects against the other, even though they would both do better if they cooperated.

The normal game for prisoners' dilemma is shown below:

	Prisoner B stays silent (cooperates)	Prisoner B betrays (defects)
Prisoner A stays silent (cooperates)	Each serves 1 month	Prisoner A: 12 months Prisoner B: goes free
Prisoner A betrays (defects)	Prisoner A: goes free Prisoner B: 12 months	Each serves 3 months

Standard game theory bases rationality in individual self-interest, and thus predicts that all rational agents will choose defect. However, as Gold and Sugden note, between 40 and 50 percent of participants in prisoner's dilemma trials instead choose cooperate. They argue that by employing we-reasoning, a team of people can intend and act in rational ways to achieve the outcome they, as a group, desire. Members of a group reason with the goal of achieving not "what is best for me", but "what is best for us". This distinction draws on Searle's claim that "the notion of a we-intention...implies the notion of cooperation". As a result, if each prisoner recognizes that they belong to a team, they will conclude that cooperation is in the best interest of the group.

== See also ==
- Collective action
- Collective intelligence
- Functionalism
- Group mind
- Language
- Moral responsibility
- Shared intentionality
- Social phenomenology
