= Agnosticism =

Doubt about God's existence

Agnosticism is a position that questions the existence of God or the divine. On a psychological level, it is a personal attitude that suspends judgment, withholding both belief and disbelief. In philosophy, agnosticism is often treated as a general claim stating that God's existence is unknown or unknowable. In the broadest sense, agnosticism is not restricted to theology and can also express skeptical attitudes toward non-religious claims.

Agnosticism contrasts with theism, which affirms God's existence, and atheism, which denies it. (Note: Atheism is sometimes defined more broadly as the absence of belief rather than the presence of disbelief; see § Theism and atheism.) It is often understood either as a neutral middle ground between the two or as a rejection of their shared assumption that knowledge is attainable. Agnosticism is commonly characterized as an informed indecision by someone who has reflected on the issue but has not reached a conclusion, distinguishing agnostics from those who have never considered the issue. It is related to skepticism and fallibilism, which deny that knowledge or absolute certainty is possible.

Arguments for and against agnosticism are discussed in the academic literature. Proponents typically hold that evidence regarding God's existence is inconclusive and that intellectual humility demands suspending judgment. Different groups of critics contend that there is decisive evidence either for or against God's existence, or that the absence of decisive evidence leaves disbelief, rather than the suspension of judgment, as the default attitude. Agnosticism is often associated with a secular lifestyle that resembles atheism in practice, but it does not necessarily preclude religion. For example, agnostic theists believe in God while denying that true knowledge of the divine is possible.

The term agnosticism was coined in the 19th century by Thomas Henry Huxley, who rejected speculative theological and metaphysical conclusions without sufficient evidence. However, its precursors and theoretical roots can be traced to antiquity, including ideas found in ancient Greek and Indian thought.

== Definition ==
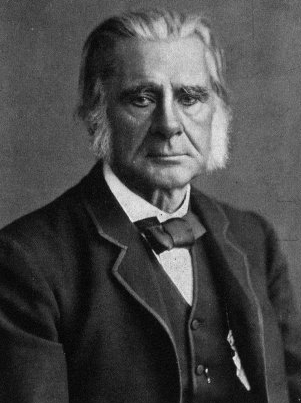
Thomas Henry Huxley coined the term agnosticism.

Agnosticism is a stance questioning the existence of God or the divine. It is a neutral position in which an individual neither affirms nor denies God's existence. Instead, they withhold judgment and remain open to both possibilities. Agnosticism is typically contrasted with belief and disbelief, and is understood either as the absence of both or as a distinct attitude, such as a settled indecision. A commonly discussed criterion is that the agnostic has considered the question of God's existence but has not reached a positive or negative conclusion. In this sense, someone who does not comprehend the question or has never thought about it, such as an infant, does not count as agnostic. (Note: Philosophers discuss the sense in which agnosticism involves a question. For example, Jane Friedman characterizes it as a question-directed attitude, which has a question as its content, structurally resembling a form of inquiry. Avery Archer, by contrast, understands it as a questioning attitude, which has a proposition as its content and is skeptical about its truth value, emphasizing structural similarities among agnosticism, belief, and disbelief.) Agnostics are often motivated by the idea that the available evidence is inconclusive, preferring to withhold assent as an expression of intellectual humility rather than adopt a dogmatic stance.

Philosophers often define agnosticism in a stronger sense as the theory that the existence of God is unknowable. This attitude goes beyond suspension of belief by embracing the claim that human cognition is too limited to access or verify this information. In its broadest sense, agnosticism is not restricted to religious questions but can be applied to any field. For example, a person can be agnostic about the truth of string theory or the existence of free will if they are unable to reach a verdict on these issues.

Agnosticism is often contrasted with theism and atheism and treated either as a middle ground between the two or as a rejection of their shared assumption that knowledge about God is attainable. Some approaches group agnosticism with atheism as an irreligious attitude in which belief in God is absent. Agnostics are not necessarily opposed to religion and may engage in some religious practices and traditions while remaining uncommitted about God's existence. (Note: Unlike organized religions, agnosticism is not a codified institution and lacks canonical scriptures or formal membership.)

The word agnosticism derives from the Ancient Greek terms ἀ- (a-), meaning 'not, without', and γνῶσις (gnōsis), meaning 'knowledge'. It was coined by Thomas Henry Huxley in a speech to the Metaphysical Society in 1869 to describe the view that humans lack the cognitive capacity to attain definitive knowledge about God and related matters. (Note: The term agnosticism is not the direct opposite of gnosticism, which refers to a family of Hellenistic religions that flourished in the 1st and 2nd centuries CE.) Agnosticism is discussed in several fields of inquiry, including theology, philosophy of religion, psychology of religion, religious studies, and the social sciences.

== Types ==
Several types of agnosticism are discussed in the academic literature, distinguished by the kind of attitude, form of inquiry, and scope of subject matter.

=== Based on attitude ===
Psychological or doxastic agnosticism is a suspension of judgment. In this sense, a person is agnostic if they have considered God's existence but neither believe nor disbelieve it. Psychological agnosticism describes someone's state of mind without implying that this state is rational or demanded by a general lack of evidence. It contrasts with epistemological or cognitive agnosticism, which asserts that the existence of God is unknown or unknowable. Epistemological agnosticism argues that humans are unable to acquire this kind of information or that there is insufficient evidence to reach a definitive verdict. Some versions maintain that no evidence is available; others hold that the evidence for and against is mixed or balances out. In either case, epistemological agnosticism concerns what people should or should not believe, not what they actually believe. Accordingly, it rejects both theism and atheism for claiming more than the evidence permits. Epistemological agnosticism is sometimes interpreted as skepticism about God because of its focus on the limits of knowledge.

A related distinction focuses on the degree of commitment. Weak agnosticism is a personal attitude of someone who neither believes nor disbelieves. It is a lack of conviction in which an individual does not commit to either option without generalizing this stance into a universal claim about what others can or cannot know. Strong agnosticism, by contrast, embraces the more assertive position that knowledge of God's existence is impossible. The contrast between weak and strong agnosticism is sometimes framed as a claim about what is reasonable to believe. In this sense, weak agnosticism holds that it is rational to suspend judgment about God. This view does not deem theism and atheism irrational; it merely treats suspension of judgment as a permissible option. Strong agnosticism, by contrast, involves the wider claim that agnosticism is the only viable option, meaning that claims about the existence or non-existence of God lack sufficient justification and should be withheld. (Note: Another conception equates the distinction between weak and strong agnosticism with the distinction between temporary and permanent agnosticism. It holds that weak agnosticism leaves open the possibility of reaching knowledge in the future, which strong agnosticism denies.)

=== Based on inquiry ===
A different set of distinctions targets the inquiry involved in the agnostic stance. Grounded agnosticism is the result of serious inquiry: the person has considered the options, tried to gather evidence, and reflected on the arguments for and against. After taking everything into account, they have concluded that neither belief nor disbelief is decisively justified, leading them to see the matter as unresolvable. Ungrounded agnosticism, by contrast, withholds judgment without engaging in substantive investigation. In this case, the person understands the issue and has a basic idea of how an inquiry could proceed but has not undertaken it, for example, because they do not consider the issue important enough. The term stored agnosticism is sometimes used for an even weaker form in which a person lacks an opinion because they have never considered the issue. It is controversial whether this attitude should be regarded as a genuine form of agnosticism since no deliberate assessment of the issue was involved.

Another distinction is between optimistic, pessimistic, and hesitant agnosticism, which agree about the current lack of knowledge but disagree about the prospects of future inquiry. According to optimistic agnosticism, also called temporary agnosticism in practice, the issue may be decided in the future. In this case, a person suspends judgment but remains open to the possibility that future discoveries could provide decisive evidence one way or the other. Pessimistic agnosticism, or permanent agnosticism in principle, rejects this possibility. It holds that the question is irresolvable in principle, meaning that no amount of inquiry can settle the matter. Hesitant agnosticism is undecided both about the issue itself and about the prospects of future inquiry. Accordingly, it is unsure whether further investigation can provide evidence or whether the obstacles to knowledge are insurmountable.

Pessimistic forms of agnosticism differ over whether the problem is with available evidence or with the underlying fact. According to evidence-based views, the available evidence is insufficient to settle the matter. One suggestion holds that there is no serious evidence and that all proposed arguments fall short of the standards of rationality. Another suggestion acknowledges the presence of evidence but contends that the considerations for and against God's existence cancel each other out, so that the balance of all reasons favors neither side. Fact-based views assert that no future inquiry can resolve the issue because there is no determinate fact of the matter one way or the other. According to this view, the statement "God exists" is neither true nor false but indeterminate. (Note: Another distinction is between existential agnosticism, truth agnosticism, and semantic agnosticism, concerning the type of phenomenon that is put into question. Existential agnosticism questions knowledge of the existence of a specific entity, such as God, or a group of entities, such as moral facts. Truth agnosticism questions knowledge of the truth of a specific proposition, like knowing whether one's preferred football team will win the next match. Semantic agnosticism is also concerned with a proposition, targeting not truth itself but truth conditions, like doubts about the conditions under which the statement "murder is wrong" is true. Semantic agnosticism is sometimes contrasted with meta-linguistic agnosticism, which suspends judgment about whether religious language aims to report truths.)

=== Others ===
Researchers also distinguish types of agnosticism based on the subject matter about which judgment is suspended. Agnosticism is typically associated with the existence of God but can be applied to other topics. For example, someone can be agnostic about the existence of intelligent extraterrestrial life or the possibility of a Grand Unified Theory in physics. Accordingly, a person is agnostic about any religious or non-religious statement if they suspend judgment about it or hold that it is unknowable. Such a stance is a local or partial agnosticism limited to a specific domain: one can be agnostic about God without being agnostic about extraterrestrial life. Global or complete agnosticism, by contrast, is a broader stance that seeks to suspend judgment about everything, arguing that nothing is knowable. It is similar to radical or philosophical skepticism, which puts everything into question. Given its sweeping implications and self-undermining tendencies, global agnosticism is rarely defended as a serious position in contemporary philosophy.

Secular and religious agnosticism are distinguished by their relation to religious attitudes and practices. Agnosticism is typically associated with a secular or atheistic outlook that doubts the existence of the divine and the truth of sacred scriptures, resulting in a non-religious lifestyle that avoids traditional worship and favors naturalistic explanations. Agnostic atheists directly combine these two strands, justifying their lack of belief by arguing that knowledge is unattainable. However, not all forms of agnosticism are opposed to religion. For example, a person may suspend judgment only about specific aspects of doctrine while accepting others and engaging in religious practices. Some religious traditions explicitly embrace a form of agnosticism, such as agnostic theism and Christian agnosticism. Such an approach can be motivated by the idea that true knowledge of the divine is impossible and that religious devotion should be guided by faith rather than reason. For example, fideism contrasts faith with reason and asserts that faith is better at arriving at religious truths. Negative theology, another school of thought, maintains that the divine transcends human concepts and language, meaning that one can describe it only in a negative sense by stating what it is not.

Methodological agnosticism is an approach to the study of religion that suspends judgment about the truth of religious doctrines. Following this approach, researchers describe, analyze, and compare the beliefs, experiences, and practices of religious traditions and their followers without endorsing or critiquing their truth claims. A key motivation is to ensure scholarly neutrality and to examine religious phenomena on their own terms without importing the researcher's personal naturalistic or supernaturalistic assumptions.

== Related views ==
=== Theism and atheism ===
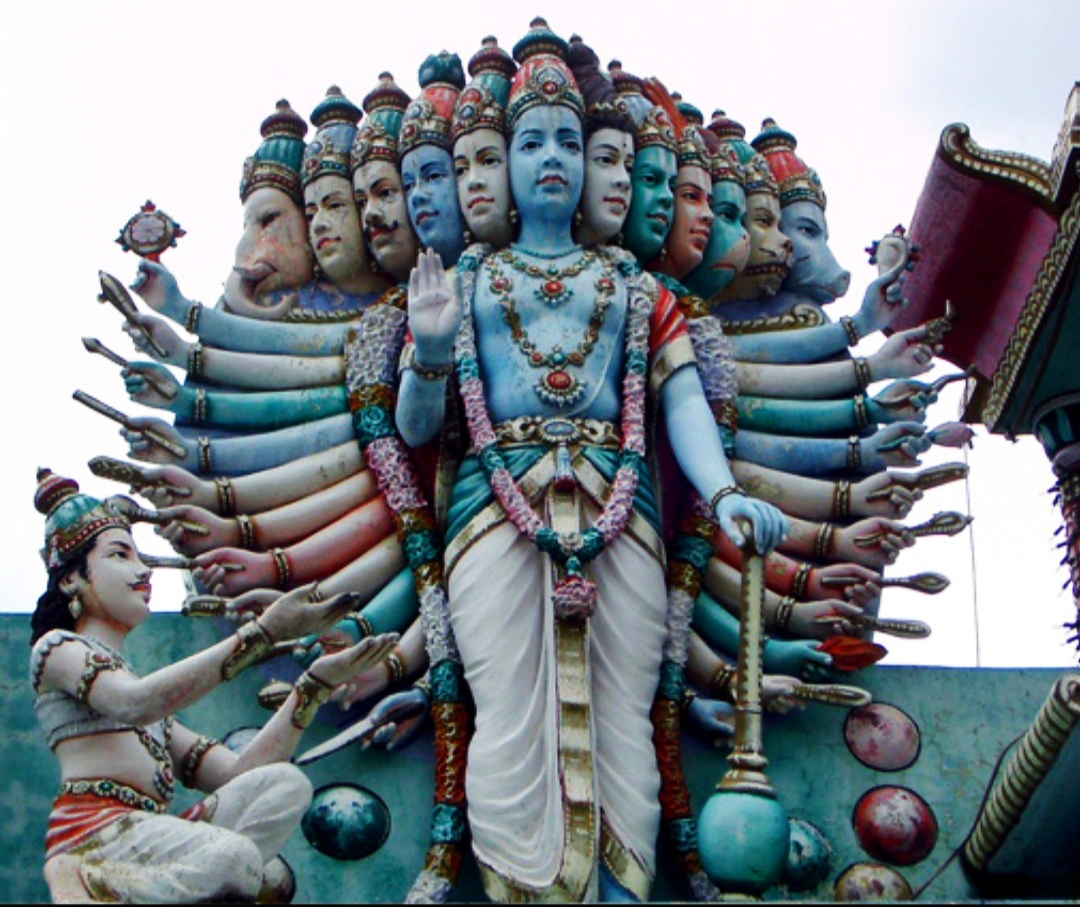
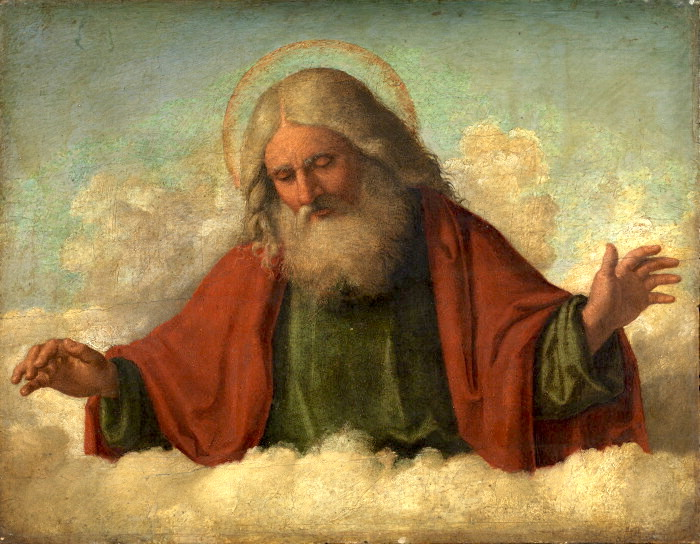
The exact understanding of the nature of the divine varies by tradition, such as the contrast between Hindu and Christian conceptions.

Agnosticism is typically contrasted with theism and atheism, but their exact relation depends on how these views are defined. Theism is the view that God or some kind of deity exists. A god is a supreme or supernatural being, usually believed to possess extraordinary power used to create, sustain, or govern the universe. (Note: The exact definition and the divine powers attributed to deities vary widely among traditions, reflected in the contrasts between Hindu, Greek, Norse, Japanese, and Aztec gods.) Monotheism holds that there is exactly one god, a view central to the Abrahamic religions. Polytheism asserts that there are many gods, as in the ancient Egyptian pantheon, which includes Ra, Osiris, and Anubis.

Atheism can be defined narrowly or broadly. In the narrow sense, it is the view that there is no god. In the broad sense, it is the absence of belief in God. This distinction matters for the relation between atheism and agnosticism. According to the narrow definition, they are distinct positions. According to the broad definition, agnosticism is a form of negative atheism that withholds belief by suspending judgment. It contrasts with positive atheism, which embraces disbelief by affirming the nonexistence of God. Some forms of atheism reject only a specific concept or understanding of God; others deny the existence of any deity, independent of tradition-specific conceptions.

According to one framework proposed by philosopher Graham Oppy, there are four mutually exclusive attitudes toward the existence of God: theists believe, atheists disbelieve, agnostics suspend judgment, and innocents have not considered the issue. This framework is complicated by an alternative definition of agnosticism, characterizing it not as a suspension of judgment but as the view that knowledge of God is unattainable. Following this definition, agnosticism can be combined with theism and atheism: agnostic theists believe in God and agnostic atheists disbelieve, but both agree that knowledge is impossible. Fideism is an outlook that often aligns with agnostic theism. It holds that reason is neither adequate nor necessary to justify religious belief, affirming faith instead as a superior path to religious truth.

=== Skepticism and fallibilism ===
Agnosticism overlaps in several ways with skepticism, which doubts knowledge claims. In its strongest form, radical skepticism is the view that knowledge is impossible. This view rejects not only knowledge of God but any form of knowledge, including the common-sense beliefs that there are other people or that there is an external world outside of one's mind. Radical skepticism is often based on the idea that it is never possible to exclude all doubt and reach absolute certainty. Narrower forms of skepticism limit doubt to specific domains. For example, moral skepticism denies knowledge of moral matters, such as statements about what actions are ethically right or wrong. In this sense, agnosticism can be interpreted as a form of religious or theological skepticism that challenges knowledge of God's existence.

Fallibilism, a related view, agrees with skepticism that absolute certainty is impossible. However, it rejects the conclusion that knowledge is unattainable, arguing instead that people can know something even if they cannot rule out all possible doubt. Accordingly, fallibilist theists and fallibilist atheists can defend their positions against skepticism and agnosticism, arguing that belief or disbelief is justified even in the absence of conclusive proof. Nonetheless, they are closer to agnosticism than their non-fallibilist counterparts since they remain more open to opposing positions by not ruling them out completely.

=== Other views ===
Like agnosticism, apatheism and ignosticism are attitudes toward the topic of God. Apatheism is an attitude of indifference: it does not care whether God exists. Apatheists are not interested in the issue as they hold that it is irrelevant to everyday concerns. By contrast, ignosticism, or igtheism, targets the concept rather than the existence of God. It holds that the concept is ill-defined so that claims about God's existence are neither true nor false but meaningless.

Other philosophical views are often invoked in the context of agnosticism, including naturalism, physicalism, empiricism, and positivism. They are sometimes attributed to agnostics, but they are not essential, and a person can be agnostic without endorsing them. Naturalism is the view that the universe is governed by natural laws and forces, excluding the influence of supernatural entities like deities. It is closely related to physicalism, the view that everything that exists is physical, implying that there are no irreducible mental or spiritual entities. Empiricism argues that all knowledge comes ultimately from sensory experience, denying the possibility of theological or metaphysical knowledge that exceeds empirical evidence. This view aligns with positivism, which emphasizes a science-based approach and verification through scientific methods. Some agnostics ground their outlook in logical positivism, dismissing theological statements that cannot be empirically verified.

Agnosticism is often associated with secularism—the view that public life should be free from religious influence. Although this outlook seeks to minimize the role of religious values, it need not endorse nihilism and can promote other values, such as moral or humanistic values.

== Arguments ==
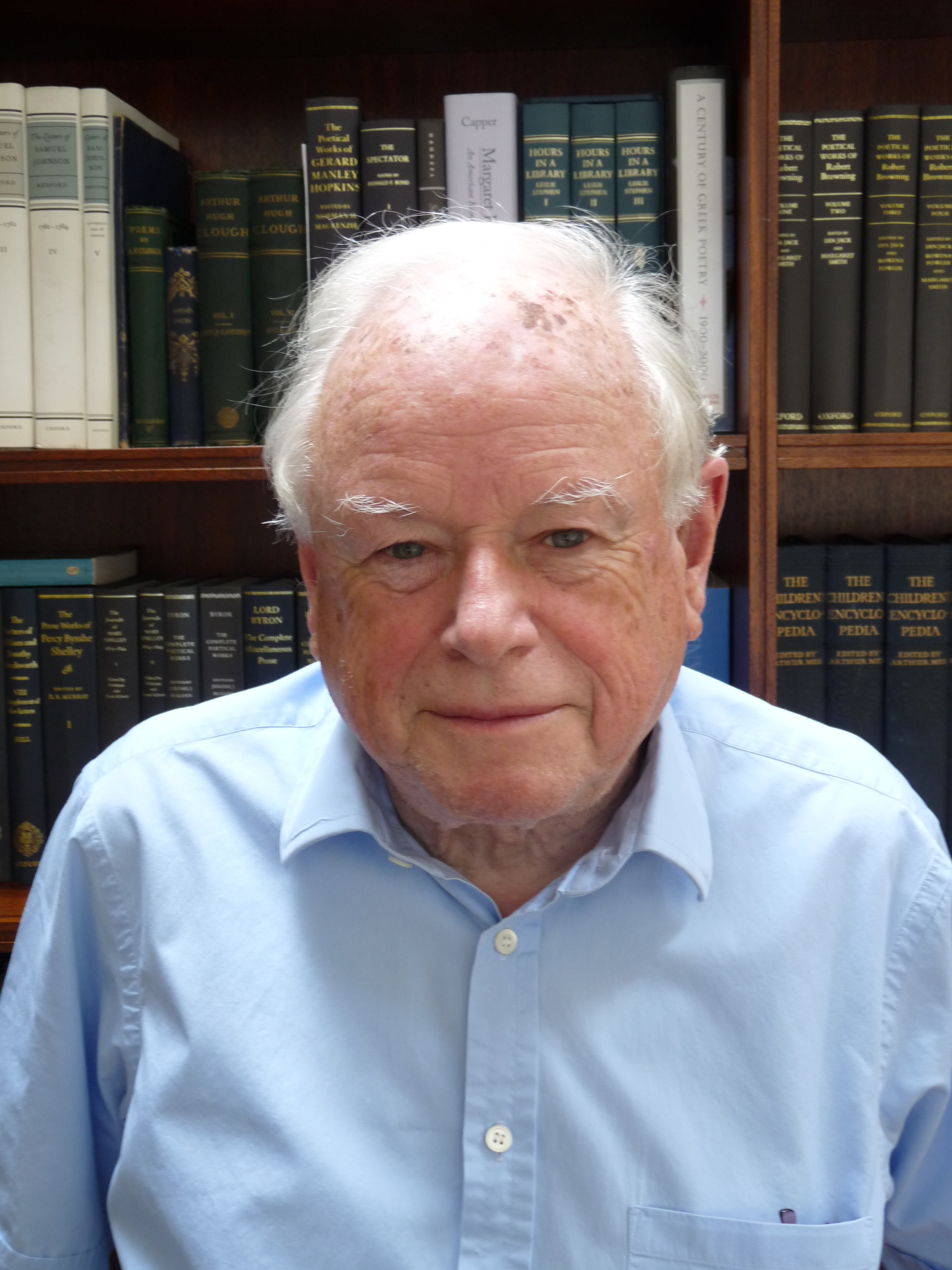
Anthony Kenny formulated a comprehensive defense of agnosticism.

Philosophers discuss several arguments for and against agnosticism, often by comparing it with theism and atheism. Many arguments focus on the available evidence for and against God's existence, relying on different principles about the relation between evidence and knowledge. Evidence for a proposition is information that counts in favor of it. Some agnostics rely on evidentialism—the view that what people should believe depends on the evidence they possess. It typically holds that a belief or disbelief is justified if it is supported by the overall balance of evidence. For example, the Lockean thesis holds that belief is justified if the degree of confidence or evidence is sufficiently high. (Note: The Lockean thesis is sometimes combined with Bayesianism, which conceptualizes degrees of confidence as numbers between 0 and 1, with 0 corresponding to certain disbelief, 1 corresponding to certain belief, and 0.5 corresponding to perfect neutrality.) Conversely, Clifford's principle maintains that belief without sufficient evidence is morally wrong. Regarding agnosticism, one view states that suspension is justified if all available evidence for and against is perfectly balanced or if no considerations meet minimal evidential standards. (Note: Guidelines of belief change include the principle of conservatism, which states that one is justified to continue believing if one does not encounter a special reason against it, and the principle of positive undermining, which states that one should stop believing upon realizing that the reasons supporting the belief are not good.)

Another suggested principle is the burden of proof: the obligation placed on one party in a dispute to justify its position. In this context, one position is often treated as the default view, requiring the other side to provide compelling reasons to challenge the privileged side. Discussions of agnosticism often hinge on whether one side bears the burden of proof or whether a lack of conclusive reasons for either side leaves agnosticism as the preferred position.

The success of the different arguments also depends on the type of agnosticism at issue. Weak forms with few theoretical commitments are usually easier to defend, whereas stronger versions require more substantial justification and are more vulnerable to criticism. For example, the weaker claim that agnosticism is rationally permissible (leaving open whether theism and atheism are also permissible) is less demanding than the stronger claim that agnosticism is obligatory (meaning that neither theism nor atheism is permissible).

=== For ===
One key argument for agnosticism holds that the available evidence regarding God is insufficient to come to a definitive conclusion. This view contends that neither theism nor atheism can be ruled out in principle since both are plausible to some extent: there are reasons why a person may adopt either position. However, these reasons are ambiguous, indecisive, or balance each other out: there is no firm basis for judging that one view is superior. Accordingly, agnostics maintain that intellectual humility and honesty require withholding both belief and disbelief.

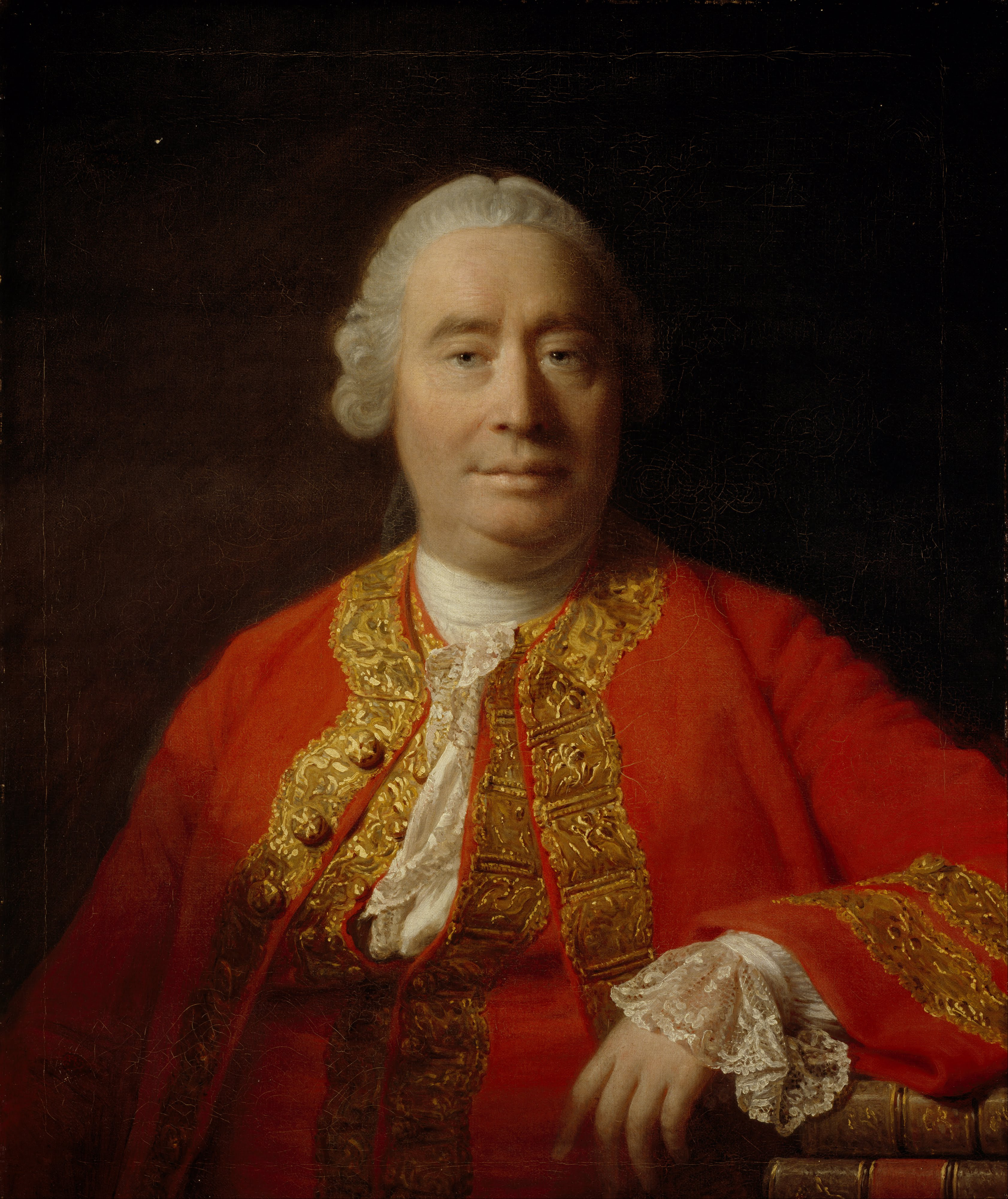
David Hume argued that knowledge of God is impossible beyond sensory experience.

A related set of arguments asserts that, strictly speaking, there is no evidence either way. For example, empiricists like David Hume hold that all knowledge of the world ultimately comes from experience. Following this view, agnostics argue that God is beyond the scope of sensory experience, so no observation or experiment could confirm or disconfirm God's existence. A similar perspective, based on Kantian philosophy, states that knowledge is limited to the realm of appearances, while knowledge of things-in-themselves, including God, is inaccessible in principle.

Some religious traditions maintain that there is no evidence because God is hidden. According to this view, the divine intentionally conceals itself from human understanding. This view challenges the possibility of knowledge of God since God remains inaccessible to empirical verification, typically emphasizing that faith, rather than objective proof, is the appropriate attitude toward God. A related view holds that God is inaccessible to human understanding because God cannot be grasped through mental concepts. For example, Sir William Hamilton argued that knowledge always limits its topic to certain conditions, and that God, as the unconditioned or the absolute, cannot be grasped this way.

One science-based argument attacks the standards of theological evidence. It contends that, compared to the empirical rigor of the scientific method, theological arguments are often too weak to support knowledge claims. Arguments based on peer disagreement focus on the opinions and discussions of experts, such as theologians and philosophers of religion. This line of thought maintains that the persistent, deep disagreements among well-informed authorities indicate that the current state of inquiry justifies neither belief nor disbelief.

A different argument focuses on the beneficial consequences of agnosticism. It holds that agnostic open-mindedness is best suited to intellectual progress and cultural tolerance, which may promote the peaceful coexistence of diverse religious and non-religious groups in pluralist societies.

=== Against ===
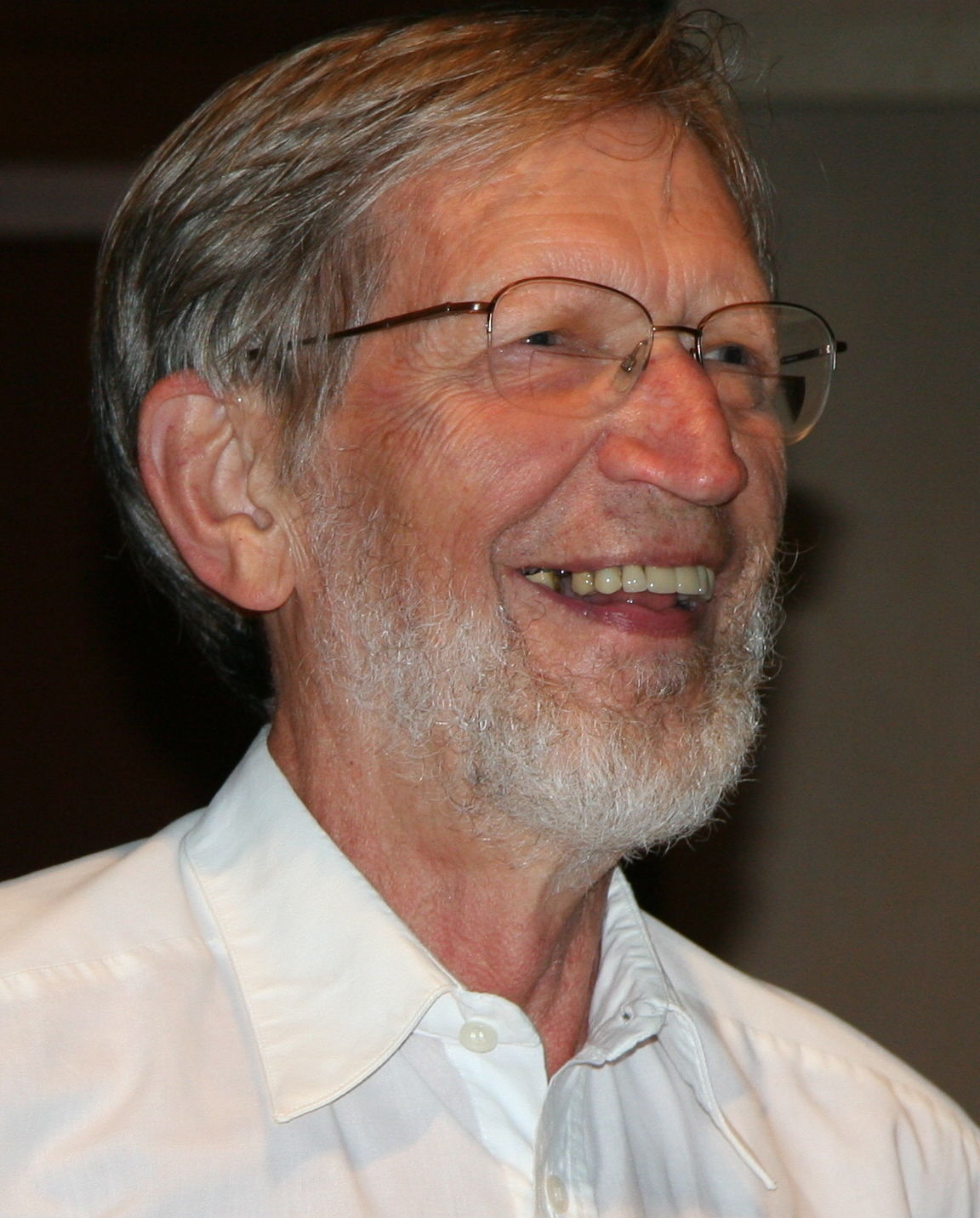
Alvin Plantinga suggested that belief in God may be a fundamental belief that does not require justification through external evidence.

Theistic criticisms of agnosticism typically seek to show that there is decisive evidence for God's reality, rendering the suspension of judgment irrational. The first-cause argument asserts that everything that begins has a cause. It argues that to explain the existence of the universe as a whole, one needs to posit God as a first cause or an unmoved mover responsible for bringing it into being. The argument from intelligent design focuses on the complex order present in the universe, such as highly organized biological organisms and intelligent life. It holds that such complexity could not have emerged on its own through mere chance but is best explained as the product of a divine intelligent creator. Moral arguments assert that a supreme moral authority and lawmaker is the most plausible account of the existence of morality, such as binding moral values and duties. Another line of reasoning appeals to religious experiences, such as dreams and visions of the divine or mystical episodes, as evidence of God's existence. Tradition-specific arguments claim that particular holy texts, such as the Bible, reveal God's reality. (Note: Another argument compares the number of possible worlds with and without a creator. It holds that for each uncreated world, there are infinitely many created worlds, making it very likely that the actual world was created by a god.)

Inspired by Alvin Plantinga, some theists hold that belief in God is a basic or fundamental belief, meaning that its justification does not rest on external evidence. In this sense, belief in God is analogous to belief in one's perceptions: people usually trust them without requiring independent external proof to validate them.

Some atheistic criticisms of agnosticism seek to show that there is overwhelming evidence that there is no God, rendering neutrality indistinguishable from unjustified doubt. Science-based arguments hold that scientific explanations are superior to religious ones without invoking deities, emphasizing the rigor of inquiry through testable hypotheses and empirical confirmation or disconfirmation. For example, the theory of evolution is often used to explain phenomena that some theists attribute to God, including the emergence of complex order and morality. It asserts that these phenomena arise through the principle of natural selection, based on the mechanisms of survival and reproduction. Other arguments target specific conceptions of God, contending that they fail to align with reality. The argument from suffering focuses on the presence of suffering in the world, caused by disease, natural disasters, war, terrorism, moral evil, and other factors. It holds that an all-knowing, all-benevolent, and all-powerful deity would not allow suffering, leading to the conclusion that such a being cannot exist.

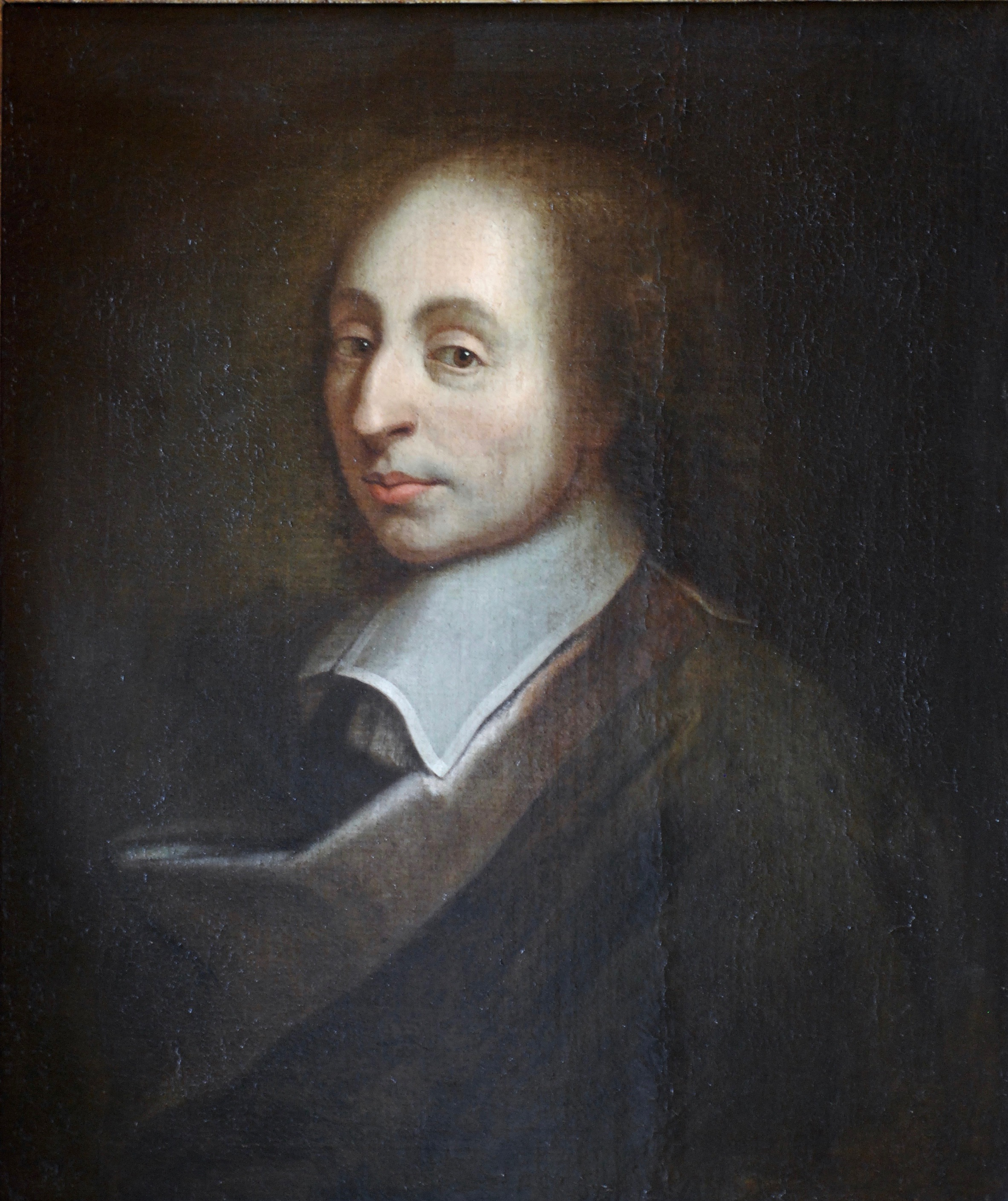
Blaise Pascal recommended belief in God because of potential practical benefits, even if knowledge is not possible.

Another atheistic objection focuses on the absence of evidence for the reality of God rather than the presence of evidence for the non-reality of God. It asserts that the burden of proof lies with theists and that they are unable to meet it, leaving atheism rather than agnosticism as the default position. For example, the lack of evidence for the existence of unicorns is usually taken as a sufficient reason to disbelieve rather than to suspend judgment. (Note: Russell's teapot is a similar thought experiment illustrating how the burden of proof lies with those who make unfalsifiable claims. It considers the hypothesis that a teapot orbits the Sun between Earth and Mars—an object too small to detect on the scale of the Solar System. Bertrand Russell argues that disbelief, rather than agnosticism, is the appropriate attitude despite the absence of definitive evidence against the hypothesis.) A different criticism holds that if a benevolent God existed, they would make ample evidence of their existence available to relieve humans of doubt. Accordingly, the absence of decisive evidence is taken as a reason for disbelief. A related argument holds that the evidential standards of agnostics are too high, resulting in excessive skepticism and paralyzing neutrality.

A position inspired by logical positivism critiques agnosticism alongside theism and atheism. It asserts that talk of God is meaningless because it cannot be verified or falsified, undermining the assumption that believing, disbelieving, and suspending judgment are coherent alternatives.

Some criticisms of agnosticism target its practical consequences rather than its theoretical justifications. Pascal's wager recommends belief in God based on considerations of possible outcomes. It holds that if the belief turns out to be true, one is rewarded with an eternal blissful life in heaven. According to Pascal, if the belief turns out to be false, the costs of adopting this erroneous outlook are minor, making the belief a wager worth taking since the potential benefits outweigh possible risks. Another line of thought claims that agnosticism has harmful consequences. For example, its focus on doubt may inhibit action and lead to moral collapse, leaving individuals without guidance or answers to the big questions of life. A different objection holds that agnosticism is a weak or anti-intellectual attitude, allegedly rooted in laziness toward inquiry and an unwillingness to use reason.

== Lifestyles and implications ==
Philosophers and social scientists discuss which lifestyles are compatible with agnosticism. It is often associated with a non-religious way of life centered on secular values, worldly well-being, and everyday concerns. In this sense, agnostics differ from atheists on a theoretical level but align on a practical level: they may act as if God does not exist, eschewing religious traditions and faith-based rituals. Instead of following religious moral teachings, they may adopt secular ethical frameworks, practice compassionate social engagement, or promote social equality, justifying moral principles through rationality or humanistic ideals rather than divine command. Agnostics may also cultivate an inquiry-based outlook focused on uncertainty, open-mindedness, and love of the unknown. This perspective treats the question of God's existence as an unsolved mystery and continues to investigate it, similar to how a detective approaches an open case by remaining receptive and entertaining suspicions. In this regard, the agnostic actively considers the different possibilities, staying interested without committing to either side.

Agnosticism is also compatible with some religious lifestyles. For example, an agnostic may engage in religion in a practical sense while suspending judgment in a theoretical sense. Accordingly, they may participate in devotional practices, observe faith-based customs, and follow religious teachings, guided by hope without holding a firm belief. A related form of agnosticism accepts belief but denies knowledge: an agnostic may affirm God's existence on a personal level while acknowledging that it cannot be known objectively or with certainty. This doubt about the capacity of humans to comprehend the divine can be combined with an emphasis on faith as a leap beyond evidence to guide conduct. Agnosticism is further compatible with religious traditions that do not believe in a personal deity, such as certain strands of Buddhism and Taoism.

On a psychological level, religious individuals tend to report higher mental well-being than atheists and agnostics, including higher overall happiness and self-esteem, and lower levels of depression and anxiety. Researchers debate the source of this effect, questioning, for example, whether it arises from religious beliefs themselves or from stronger social support networks associated with regular religious gatherings. Surveys further indicate that atheists and agnostics are more reflective than believers and rely more on analytical thinking for problem-solving and decision-making. Research also suggests differences in personality traits between agnostics and atheists: agnostics tend to be more open, prosocial, spiritual, and anxious, whereas atheists are more inclined toward analytical reasoning and have higher emotional stability.

On a social level, one line of thought holds that agnosticism promotes cultural tolerance, helping different religious and secular groups live together peacefully. A different outlook warns of potential negative effects of agnosticism, arguing that lack of commitment can paralyze decision-making and result in moral decay. In some religious societies, agnostics may face discrimination as other members associate their neutral attitude with social deviance or negative personality traits.

Different estimates of the global prevalence of agnosticism have been suggested. They are complicated by the tendency of researchers to group atheists and agnostics into a single category, and by the fact that many countries do not systematically track the religious identification of their populations. According to a 2007 estimate, about 7% of the world's population is either atheist or agnostic, the number of atheists and agnostics being roughly the same. The proportion of agnostics varies widely by country. A 2008 survey reports rates as low as 1% in Venezuela, Chile, and Turkey, and as high as 19% in Japan and Sweden. Men are more likely than women to identify as agnostic.

== History ==
=== Ancient and medieval ===
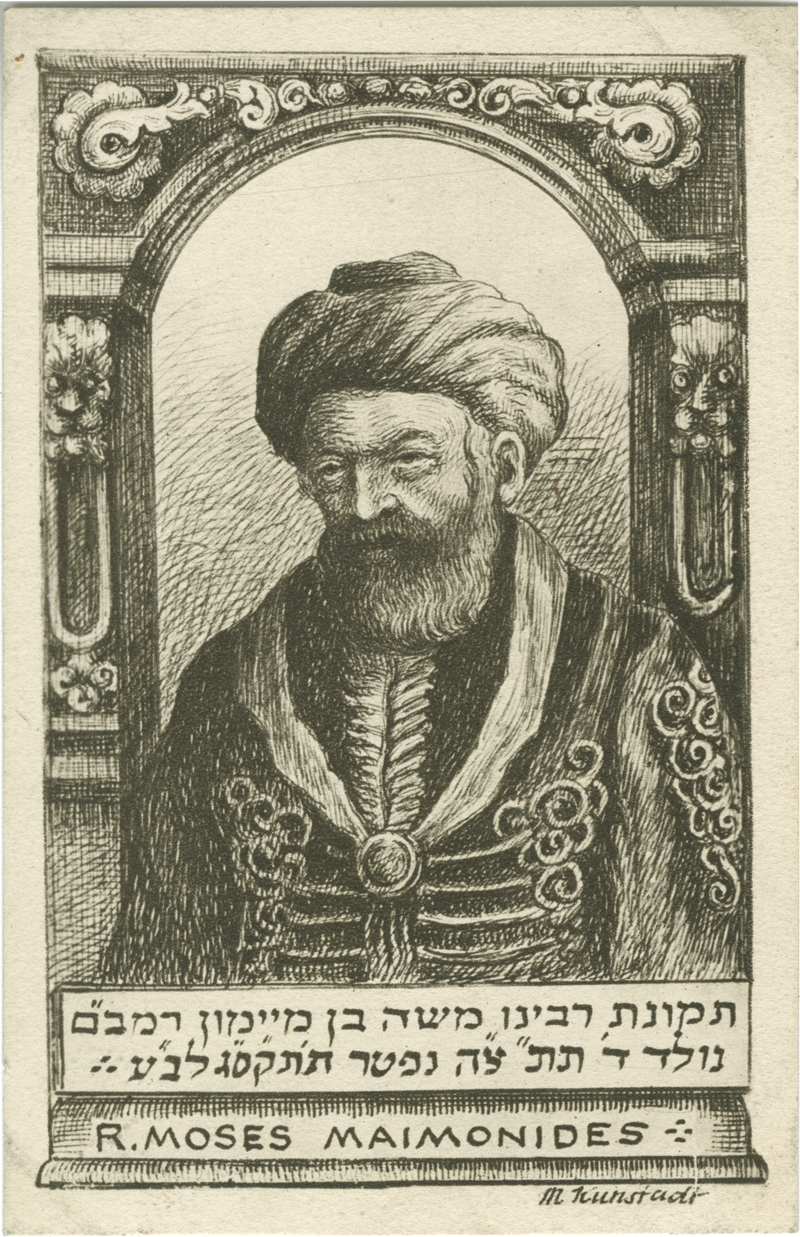
Maimonides held that God's nature is unknowable and that accurate descriptions can only be given in negative terms by saying what God is not.

Although the term agnosticism was coined in the 19th century, its theoretical roots lie in antiquity. In ancient Greece, the pre-Socratic philosopher Protagoras (c. 490 – c. 420 BCE) formulated an early form of agnosticism, arguing that the gods are veiled in uncertainty and questioning the possibility of objective knowledge. A further forerunner, Socrates (c. 470 – c. 399 BCE) emphasized the limits of human knowledge, advocating humility and awareness of one's own ignorance. Ancient skepticism was another precursor, typically targeting knowledge in general rather than specifically knowledge of God. Pyrrho (c. 360 – c. 270 BCE) maintained that humans cannot reach certainty and recommended suspension of judgment over dogmatic belief as a way to achieve a form of equanimity. Pyrrhonian skepticism was later systematized by Sextus Empiricus (fl. around 200 CE), who examined how different arguments often lead to opposite conclusions, suggesting that people should remain neutral.

In ancient Hindu thought, agnostic ideas are found in the Nāsadīya Sūkta (Hymn of Creation), a text from the Rigveda, composed in the 2nd millennium BCE. It questions whether knowledge of gods and the creation is possible. In the 6th century BCE, a broader skepticism, advanced by the school of Ajñana, challenged the possibility and usefulness of knowledge in general. Some agnostic themes, such as a skepticism about knowledge of ultimate reality, are also found in Buddhist philosophy, a tradition that arose roughly in the 5th century BCE, and in the thought of Confucius around 500 BCE.

In medieval Christian philosophy, Pseudo-Dionysius (5th or 6th century CE) formulated key ideas of negative theology, arguing that God transcends human concepts and understanding. Negative theology also played a central role in the philosophy of Thomas Aquinas (1225–1274 CE). He affirmed God's existence but adopted an agnostic attitude toward knowledge of God's nature, holding that representations of God's attributes are never fully adequate. (Note: A comparable outlook is also found in the thought of Meister Eckhart (c. 1260 – c. 1328 CE).) William of Ockham (c. 1287 – c. 1347 CE) argued that the human intellect is too limited to know God, contending that religious faith takes precedence over philosophical reason in theological matters. In Jewish philosophy, Maimonides (c. 1135–1204 CE) asserted that although God's existence can be known, the divine essence remains utterly unknowable, meaning that God can be described only in negative terms by stating what God is not. Some strands of Islamic philosophy questioned the possibility of religious knowledge, such as al-Razi's (c. 865 – c. 925 CE) criticism of prophecies, but usually without extending this skepticism toward the existence of Allah.

=== Modern and contemporary ===
In early modern philosophy, Blaise Pascal (1623–1662) argued that even if certain knowledge of God is impossible, one should nonetheless choose to believe because of potential practical benefits. Following an empiricist outlook, David Hume (1711–1776) held that knowledge of the world is limited to sensory experience, leading him to conclude that knowledge of a supernatural God is impossible. Inspired by Hume, Immanuel Kant (1724–1804) contended that human understanding is limited to the realm of appearances and cannot extend to things-in-themselves, which implies that the existence of God is not accessible to theoretical knowledge.

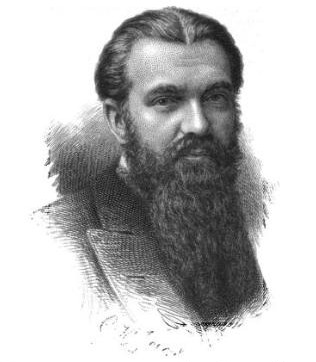
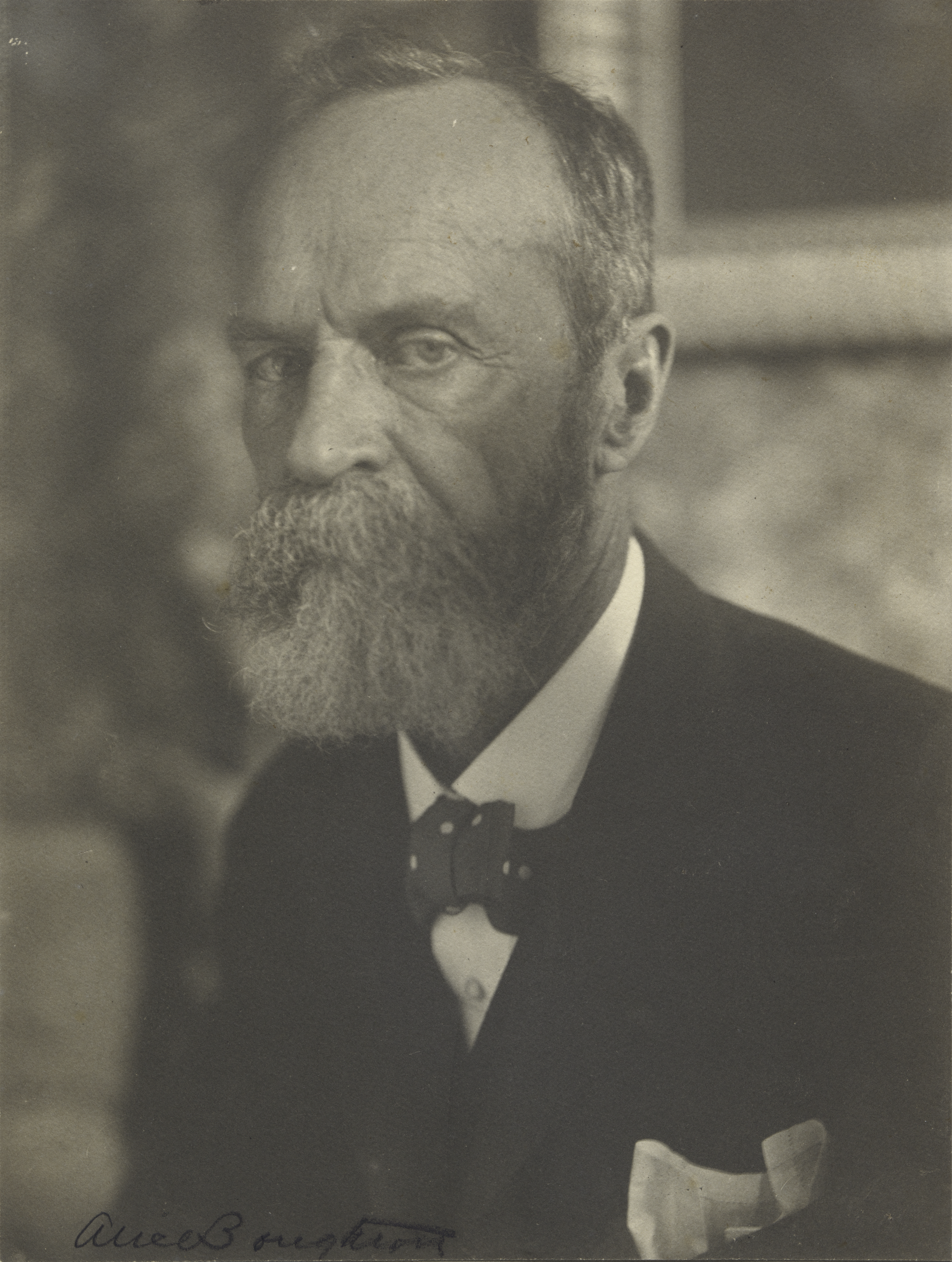
William Kingdon Clifford and William James disagreed about whether belief without sufficient evidence is always wrong.

Sir William Hamilton (1788–1856) developed Kant's ideas about the nature of knowledge to defend agnosticism, maintaining that to understand something is to impose certain limits on it. He held that this process necessarily misconstrues God since God has no such limits, making accurate knowledge of the divine impossible. Drawing on Hamilton, Henry Longueville Mansel (1820–1871) concluded that reason can attain only relative knowledge while knowledge of the absolute is contradictory. For Mansel, the realm of theology lies beyond rational inquiry and depends on revelation and faith. Hamilton's thought also influenced Herbert Spencer (1820–1903), who sought a comprehensive philosophical system synthesizing science and religion. He held that an ultimate reality is responsible for phenomena while knowledge is limited to phenomena, science being dedicated to what is knowable and religion dedicated to what is unknowable.

[The agnostic] principle may be stated in various ways, but they all amount to this: that it is wrong for a man to say that he is certain of the objective truth of any proposition unless he can produce evidence which logically justifies that certainty.

— Thomas Henry Huxley

Charles Darwin's (1809–1882) formulation of the theory of evolution was a key factor in the popularization of agnosticism as it undermined traditional religious teachings of a divine creator to explain the diversity of life. Influenced by Darwin, Thomas Henry Huxley (1825–1895) coined the term agnosticism in a speech to the Metaphysical Society in 1869 as an alternative to theism and atheism. He understood it as the epistemological principle that one should not claim to know something without satisfactory evidence. Huxley saw it as a method of inquiry that refuses speculative conclusions, applying it specifically to theological and metaphysical problems. As a result of religious skepticism fueled by Darwin's and Huxley's works, agnosticism gained cultural traction starting at the end of the 19th century and spread to the general public through popular journals, public lectures, and philosophical debates. Central to this popularization were the initiatives of editors of popular journals, such as Richard Holt Hutton (1826–1897) and James Thomas Knowles (1831–1908), and the establishment of The Agnostic Annual—a journal dedicated exclusively to agnosticism. Robert G. Ingersoll (1833–1899), nicknamed the "Great Agnostic" by his contemporaries, was instrumental in popularizing the newly coined term in the United States as a traveling lecturer.

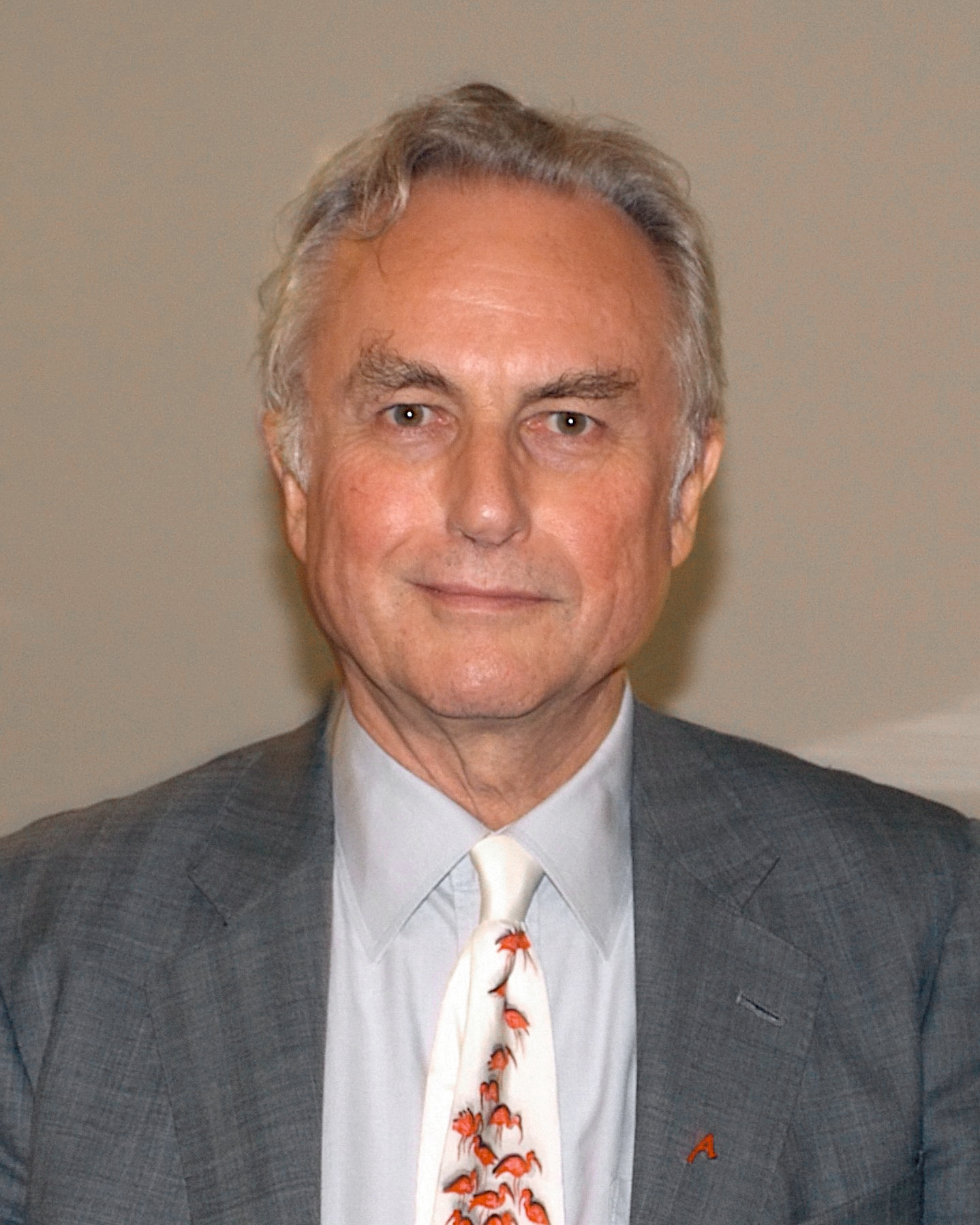
Richard Dawkins maintained that the burden of proof lies with theism, concluding that lack of evidence calls for atheism rather than agnosticism.

Søren Kierkegaard (1813–1855) explored how agnosticism can be combined with belief in God. He proposed a leap of faith, arguing that what matters for religion is an inward passion even when there is no objective certainty. (Note: John Stuart Mill (1806–1873), George Eliot (1819–1880), and Leslie Stephen (1832–1904), by contrast, challenged orthodox Christian doctrine from the perspective of scientific naturalism, adopting an agnostic outlook instead.) In his repudiation of Christian belief, William Kingdon Clifford (1845–1879) formulated Clifford's principle, stating that it is always wrong to believe without sufficient evidence. William James (1842–1910) challenged this principle from a pragmatist perspective. He maintained that there can be practical reasons to believe in the absence of decisive evidence and that the goal of avoiding errors must be balanced against the risk of missing momentous truths. Leslie Weatherhead (1893–1976) proposed a form of Christian agnosticism as a response to the clash between scriptural doctrine and the realities of modern life. Influenced by Huxley, Hu Shih (1891–1962) interpreted Confucianism from an agnostic perspective, rejecting its religious aspects while arguing for non-religious Confucianism.

Bertrand Russell (1872–1970) defended a form of agnosticism inclined to atheism, holding that there is no decisive evidence for or against God's existence. Responding to Russell's ideas, Richard Dawkins (born 1941) argued that the lack of evidence calls for disbelief rather than suspension of judgment. He proposed a New Atheism focused on scientific rigor. In turn, authors like J. L. Schellenberg (born 1959) and Robin Le Poidevin (born 1962) formulated a "new agnosticism" that can exist alongside religious faith and practice. (Note: Responding to Schellenberg, James Elliott proposed ietsism (literally 'somethingism') as the theory that there is an unspecified something that deserves religious commitment.)

Arguing from the perspective of logical positivism, A. J. Ayer (1910–1989) maintained that utterances about God are meaningless. Consequently, he attacked theism, atheism, and agnosticism for their shared assumption that they disagree about a substantive issue. Ludwig Wittgenstein (1889–1951) characterized faith as a form of life rather than a theoretical conclusion, meaning that it is not primarily about accurately representing reality or tracking evidence.

Influenced by Aquinas, Anthony Kenny (born 1931) formulated a comprehensive defense of agnosticism, focusing on the lack of solid evidence, flaws in arguments about God's existence, contradictory elements in divine attributes, and meaninglessness of religious language. Alvin Plantinga (born 1932) suggested that belief in God may be a fundamental belief that does not require justification through external evidence, similar to how people typically trust their perceptions without demanding further external verification.

== See also ==
- Ignoramus et ignorabimus – Maxim about limits of scientific knowledge
- List of agnostics
- Possibilianism – Theory rejecting dogmatic theism and atheism
- Strong and weak atheism – Types of atheism
