= Geoffrey Thomas Bennett =

English mathematician

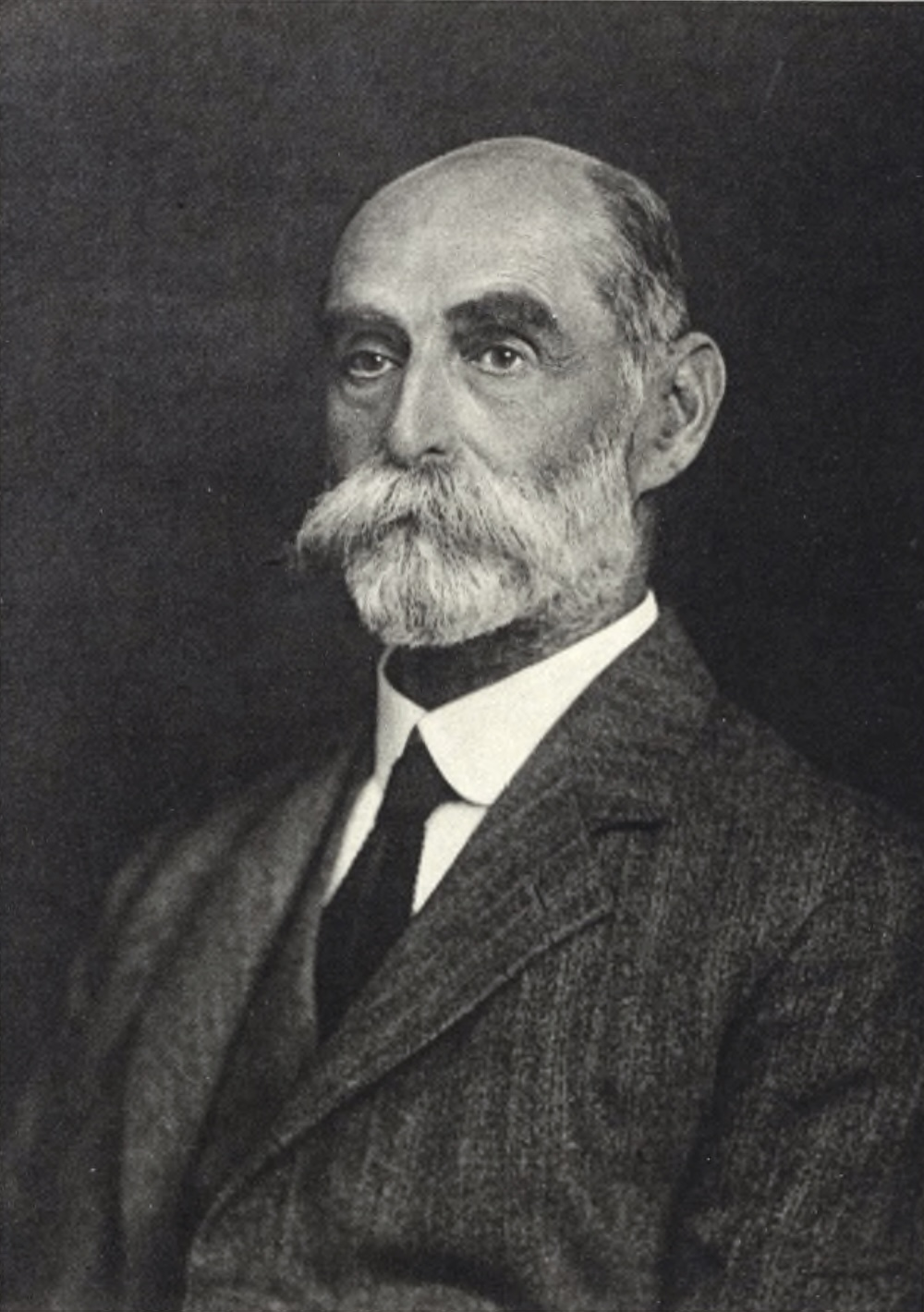
Image of Geoffrey Thomas Bennett

Geoffrey Thomas Bennett OBE (1868–1943) was an English mathematician, professor at the University of Cambridge.

== Life and work ==
Born in London, he began his secondary studies at the University College School, under Robert Tucker. After one year at University College of London, Bennett obtained a scholarship at St. John's College, Cambridge, where he graduated in 1890 as Senior Wrangler. However, the best grade in the Mathematical Tripos of that year was for Philippa Fawcett, but she was not included in the list for her gender.

Upon completion of his studies he was appointed college lecturer of mathematics at Emmanuel College, Cambridge. He held a fellowship at the college from 1893 until his death in 1943. He had also great interest in music and athletics. He was a keen bicyclist and a good pianist.

During the First World War he was member of the Anti-Aircraft Experimental Section (AAES) for his versatility and for his ability solving geometrical problems by mechanical means.

== Selected publications ==
- Bennett, G.T. (1905). "LXXVII. The parallel motion of Sarrut and some allied mechanisms". The London, Edinburgh, and Dublin Philosophical Magazine and Journal of Science. 9 (54): 803–810. doi:10.1080/14786440509463333.
- Bennett, G. T. (1905). "The Spirit-level as a Seismoscope". Nature. 72 (1856): 80. Bibcode:1905Natur..72...80B. doi:10.1038/072080a0.
- Bennett, G. T. (1905). "The Hydrometer as a Seismometer". Nature. 72 (1861): 198. Bibcode:1905Natur..72..198B. doi:10.1038/072198b0.
- Bennett, G. T. (1911). "The Double Six" (PDF). Proceedings of the London Mathematical Society. 2 (1): 336–351. doi:10.1112/plms/s2-9.1.336.
- Bennett, G. T. (1911). "The Composition of Finite Displacements and the Use of Axodes" (PDF). Proceedings of the London Mathematical Society. 2 (1): 273–285. doi:10.1112/plms/s2-9.1.273. (See axode.)
- Bennett, G. T. (1912). "Deformable Octahedra" (PDF). Proceedings of the London Mathematical Society. 2 (1): 309–342. doi:10.1112/plms/s2-10.1.309.
- Bennett, G. T. (1912). "The System of Lines of a Cubic Surface" (PDF). Proceedings of the London Mathematical Society. 2 (1): 479–484. doi:10.1112/plms/s2-10.1.479.
- Bennett, G. T. (1914). "The skew isogram mechanism" (PDF). Proceedings of the London Mathematical Society. 2 (1): 151–173. doi:10.1112/plms/s2-13.1.151.
- Bennett, G. T. (1922). "The three-bar sextic curve" (PDF). Proceedings of the London Mathematical Society. 1 (2): 59–81. doi:10.1112/plms/s2-20.1.59.
- Bennett, G. T. (1923). "Paradromic Rings". Nature. 111 (2800): 882. Bibcode:1923Natur.111R.882B. doi:10.1038/111882b0.
- Bennett, G. T. (1939). "Continuants and precontinuants". Mathematical Proceedings of the Cambridge Philosophical Society. 35 (4): 548–561. Bibcode:1939PCPS...35..548B. doi:10.1017/S0305004100021332.

== Bibliography ==
- Baker, H.F. (1944). "Geoffrey Thomas Bennett. 1868–1943". Obituary Notices of Fellows of the Royal Society. 4 (13): 596–615. doi:10.1098/rsbm.1944.0011. ISSN 1479-571X. JSTOR 768851. S2CID 178513107.
- Bennett, Geoffrey Thomas (1903). "A New Mechanism". Engineering. 76 (Dec 4, 1903): 777–778.
- Barrow-Green, June (2014). "Cambridge Mathematicians' Responses to the First World War". In David Aubin; Catherine Goldstein (eds.). The War of Guns and Mathematics. American Mathematical Society. pp. 59–124. ISBN 978-1-4704-1469-6.
- Frederickson, Greg N. (2002). Dissections: Plane and Fancy. Cambridge University Press. ISBN 978-0-521-52582-4.
