= Ruth Farwell =

Ruth Sarah Farwell CBE DL retired as Vice-Chancellor and Chief Executive of Buckinghamshire New University in February 2015.

Farwell held a research fellowship in theoretical physics at Imperial College, London, in the early eighties. Her research is at the boundary between applied mathematics and theoretical physics. Her use of Clifford algebras in her mathematics generated her interest in the Victorian mathematician William Kingdon Clifford. She continues to research the mathematical contribution of Clifford, and mathematical models of particle physics, as well as undertaking research on higher education policy. Farwell actively promotes closer collaborative efforts between universities.

The University of Kent, from which she received a master's degree, awarded her an honorary degree in 2010.

Farwell is the chair of higher education representative body GuildHE, chair of the Board of Trustees of the Open College Network, South East Region, and a board member of the Higher Education Funding Council for England (HEFCE), and the Universities and Colleges Employers Association. She serves on a number of committees including HEFCE's Teaching, Quality and the Student Experience Committee, the Quality in Higher Education Group, and Universities UK’s Student Experience Policy Committee and Health and Social Care Policy Committee.

She is a member of the London Mathematical Society and the Higher Education Academy.

She was appointed Commander of the Order of the British Empire (CBE) in the 2015 New Year Honours for services to higher education, appointed a Deputy Lieutenant of Buckinghamshire in 2015 and High Sheriff of Buckinghamshire for 2018–19.

== Selected publications ==
- Gauge Transformations (1999)
- The End of the Absolute (1990)
- Unified Spin Gauge Theory (1989)
- One-Dimensional Teda Molecule (1983)
- Derivation and Solution of the Two-Dimensional Toda Equation (1982)
- Kac-Van Moerbeke Equations (1982)

Academic offices
Preceded by ?	Vice Chancellor and Chief Executive of Buckinghamshire New University; 2006–February 2015	Succeeded by Rebecca Bunting
