= Robert Tucker (mathematician) =

British mathematician (1832–1905)

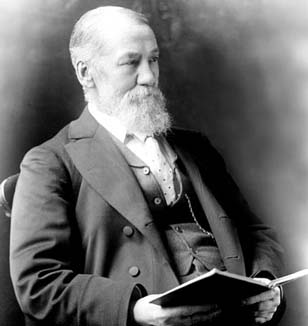
- Born: 26 April 1832; Walworth, Surrey, England
- Died: 29 January 1905 (aged 72); Worthing, England
- Education: St. John's College, Cambridge
- Scientific career
- Fields: Mathematics
- Workplaces: University College London

Robert Tucker (1832–1905) was an English mathematician, who was secretary of the London Mathematical Society for more than 30 years.

== Life and work ==
Son of a soldier who fought in the Peninsular War, Tucker studied at St. John's College, Cambridge, where he was 35th wrangler in 1855. He mastered mathematics at University College London from 1865 to 1899.

He is known for "Tucker circles", a family of circles invariant on parallel displacing.

He is also known for editing the Mathematical Papers of William Kingdon Clifford in 1882, and editing the Book IV of Elements of Dynamic in 1887.

Tucker acted as secretary of the London Mathematical Society from 1867 to 1902.

He was also a collector of mathematician's photographs. His collection, named Tucker collection is preserved by the London Mathematical Society at De Morgan house.

== Bibliography ==
- Clifford, William Kingdon (2007). William Tucker (ed.). Mathematical Papers. AMS Chelsea Publishing. ISBN 978-0-8218-4252-2.
- Rice, Adrian C.; Wilson, Robin J.; Gardner, J. Helen (1995). "From Student Club to National Society: The Founding of the London Mathematical Society in 1865". Historia Mathematica. 22 (4): 402–421. doi:10.1006/hmat.1995.1032. ISSN 0315-0860.
