= Clifford's principle =

Philosophical principle about evidence

Clifford's principle holds that it is immoral for individuals, no matter of circumstances, to believe anything without sufficient evidence. While this principle has existed for centuries, it only became prominent in the minds of the common people after the ethics of belief debate in the 19th century between W. K. Clifford and William James, with Clifford articulating the principle in his now-famous work The Ethics of Belief, where he argued in favor of evidentialism.

== History ==
While Clifford's principle can be found in works from previous philosophers such as John Milton and Samuel Coleridge, it is the most well known by Clifford's iconic definition: "It is wrong always, everywhere, and for anyone to believe anything on insufficient evidence." This principle can also be found in a slight variation, often called Clifford's Other Principle: "It is wrong always, everywhere, and for anyone to ignore evidence that is relevant to his beliefs, or to dismiss relevant evidence in a facile way."
