= William Kingdon Clifford =

British mathematician and philosopher (1845–1879)

William Clifford FRS
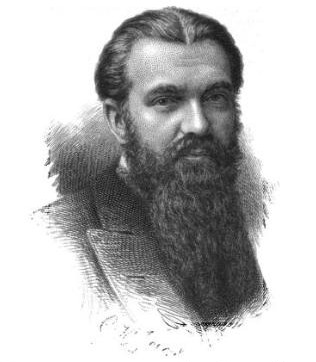
- Likeness, from the frontispiece of Lectures and Essays by the Late William Kingdon Clifford, F.R.S. (1901)
- Born: 4 May 1845; Exeter, Devon, England
- Died: 3 March 1879 (aged 33); Madeira, Portugal
- Education: King's College London; Trinity College, Cambridge
- Known for: Clifford algebra Clifford's circle theorems Clifford's theorem Clifford torus Clifford–Klein form Clifford parallel Bessel–Clifford function Dual quaternion Elements of Dynamic
- Spouse: Lucy Clifford (1875–1879)
- Scientific career
- Workplaces: University College London
- Doctoral students: Arthur Black

Signature
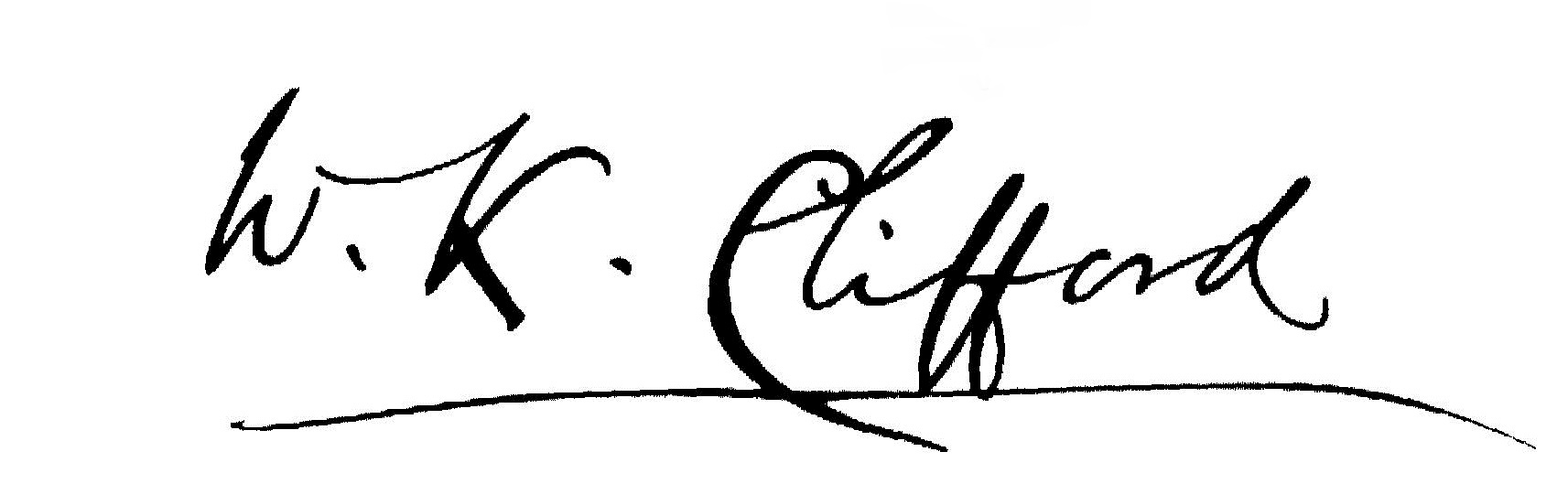

William Kingdon Clifford (4 May 1845 – 3 March 1879) was a British mathematician and philosopher. Building on the work of Hermann Grassmann, he introduced what is now termed geometric algebra. This is a special case of what later became known as the Clifford algebra, which was named in his honour. The operations of geometric algebra have the effect of mirroring, rotating, translating, and mapping the geometric objects that are being modelled to new positions. Clifford algebras in general and geometric algebra in particular have been of ever increasing importance to mathematical physics, geometry, and computing. Clifford was the first to suggest that gravitation might be a manifestation of an underlying geometry. In his philosophical writings he coined the expression mind-stuff.

== Biography ==
Born in Exeter, William Clifford was educated at Doctor Templeton's Academy on Bedford Circus and showed great promise at school. He went on to King's College London (at age 15) and Trinity College, Cambridge, where he was elected fellow in 1868, after being Second Wrangler in 1867 and second Smith's prizeman. In 1870, he was part of an expedition to Italy to observe the solar eclipse of 22 December 1870. During that voyage he survived a shipwreck along the Sicilian coast.

In 1871, he was appointed professor of mathematics and mechanics at University College London, and in 1874 became a fellow of the Royal Society. He was also a member of the London Mathematical Society and the Metaphysical Society.

Clifford married Lucy Lane on 7 April 1875, with whom he had two children. Lucy Clifford was an accomplished novelist, playwright, and journalist.

=== Death and legacy ===
In 1876, Clifford suffered a breakdown, probably brought on by overwork. He taught and administered by day, and wrote by night. A half-year holiday in Algeria and Spain allowed him to resume his duties for 18 months, after which he collapsed again. He went to the island of Madeira to recover, but died there of tuberculosis after a few months, leaving a widow with two children.

The academic journal Advances in Applied Clifford Algebras publishes on Clifford's legacy in kinematics and abstract algebra.

== Mathematics ==
"Clifford was above all and before all a geometer."

— Henry John Stephen Smith

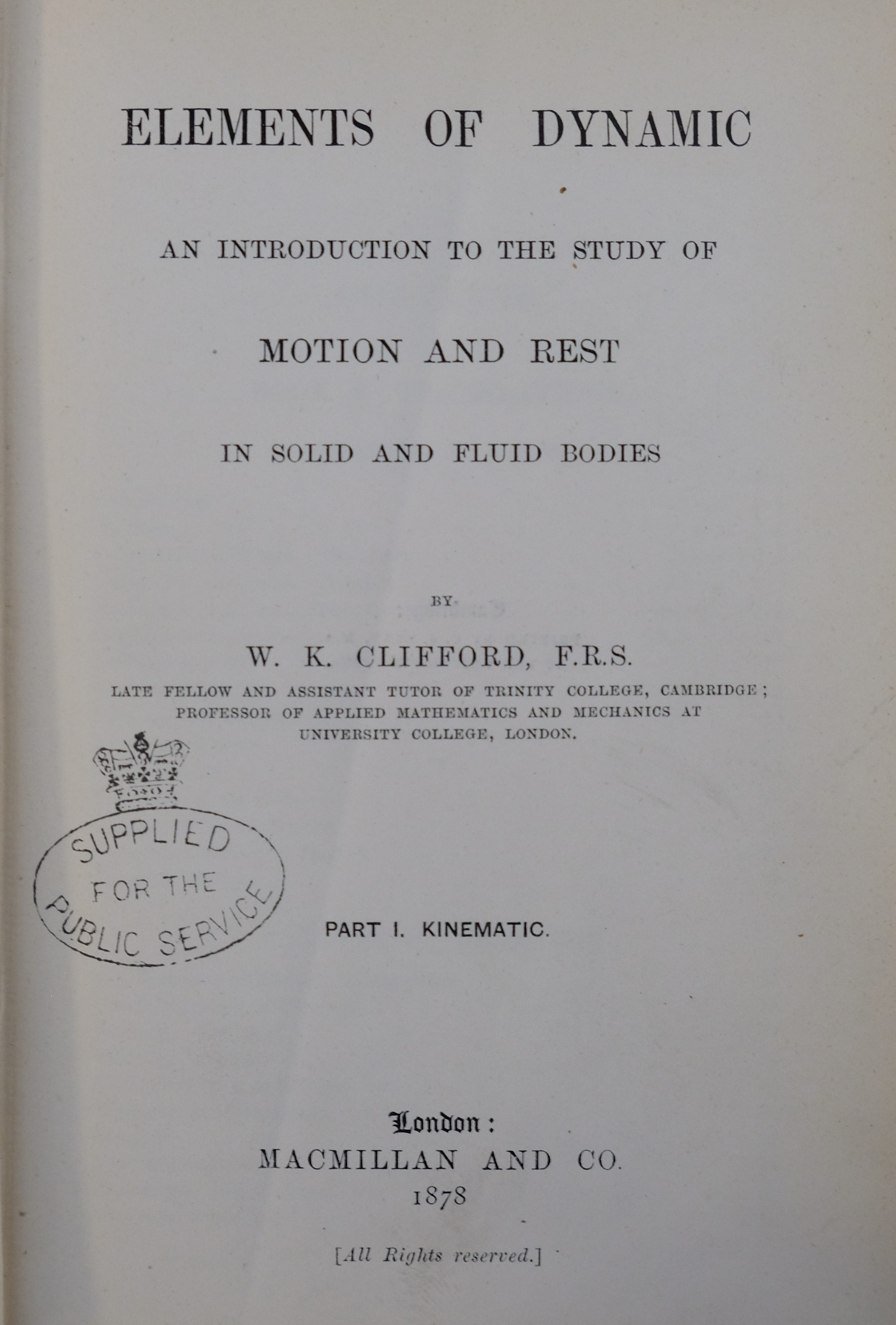
Title page of Volume 1 (1878) containing books I-III of Clifford's "Elements of Dynamic"

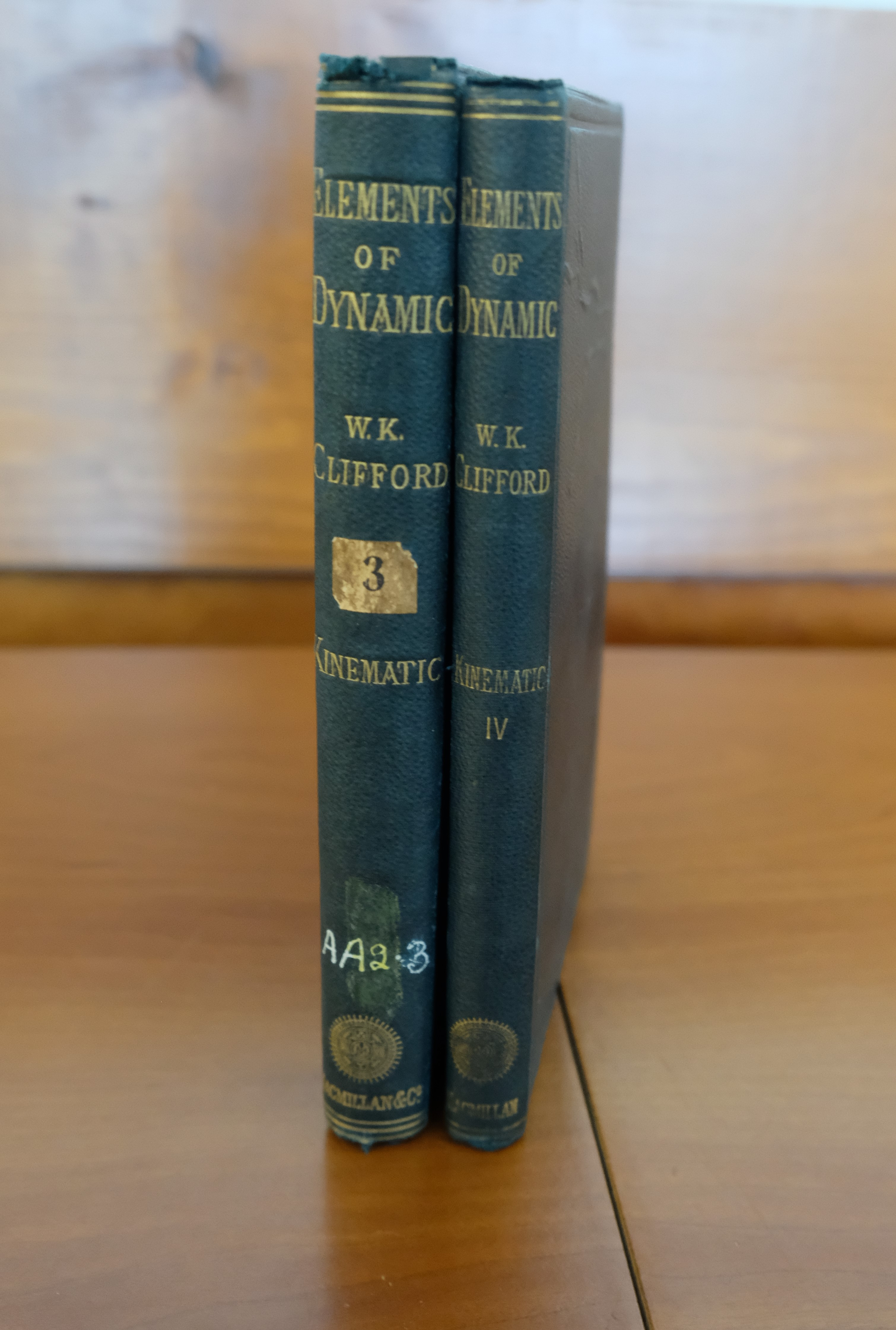
Volumes 1 (1878) and 2 (1887) containing books I-IV of Clifford's "Elements of Dynamic"

The discovery of non-Euclidean geometry opened new possibilities in geometry in Clifford's era. The field of intrinsic differential geometry was born, with the concept of curvature broadly applied to space itself as well as to curved lines and surfaces. Clifford was very much impressed by Bernhard Riemann’s 1854 essay "On the hypotheses which lie at the bases of geometry". In 1870, he reported to the Cambridge Philosophical Society on the curved space concepts of Riemann, and included speculation on the bending of space by gravity. Clifford's translation of Riemann's paper was published in Nature in 1873. The report of his 1870 talk at Cambridge was published in 1876, anticipating Albert Einstein's general relativity by 40 years. Clifford elaborated elliptic space geometry as a non-Euclidean metric space. Equidistant curves in elliptic space are now said to be Clifford parallels.

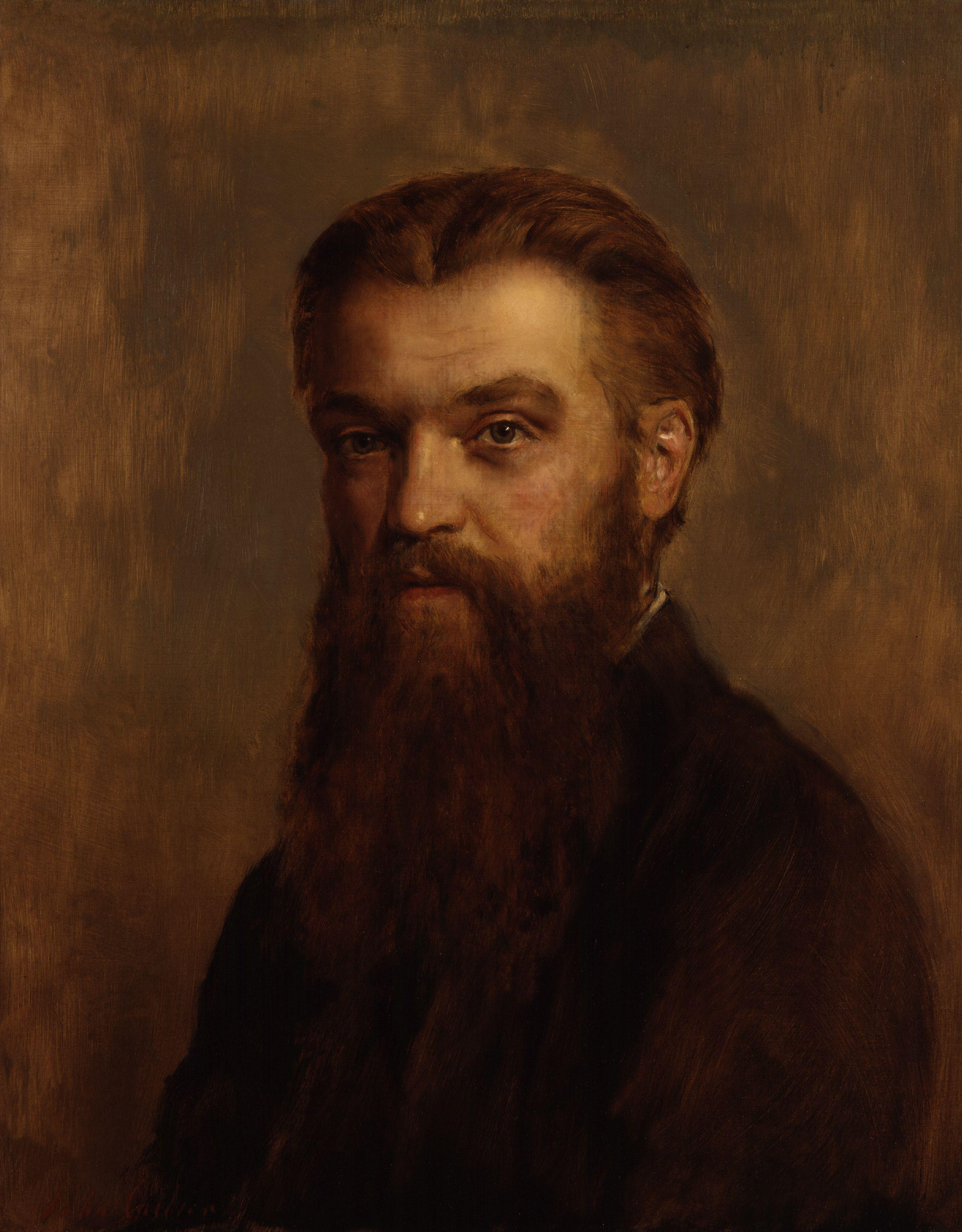
Clifford by John Collier

Clifford's contemporaries considered him acute and original, witty and warm. He often worked late into the night, which may have hastened his death. He published papers on a range of topics including algebraic forms and projective geometry and the textbook Elements of Dynamic. His application of graph theory to invariant theory was followed up by William Spottiswoode and Alfred Kempe.

=== Algebras ===
In 1878, Clifford published a seminal work, building on Grassmann's extensive algebra. He had succeeded in unifying the quaternions, developed by William Rowan Hamilton, with Grassmann's outer product (aka the exterior product). He understood the geometric nature of Grassmann's creation, and that the quaternions fit cleanly into the algebra Grassmann had developed. The versors in quaternions facilitate representation of rotation. Clifford laid the foundation for a geometric product, composed of the sum of the inner product and Grassmann's outer product. The geometric product was eventually formalized by the Hungarian mathematician Marcel Riesz. The inner product equips geometric algebra with a metric, fully incorporating distance and angle relationships for lines, planes, and volumes, while the outer product gives those planes and volumes vector-like properties, including a directional bias.

Combining the two brought the operation of division into play. This greatly expanded our qualitative understanding of how objects interact in space. Crucially, it also provided the means for quantitatively calculating the spatial consequences of those interactions. The resulting geometric algebra, as he called it, eventually realized the long sought goal (Note: "I believe that, so far as geometry is concerned, we need still another analysis which is distinctly geometrical or linear and which will express situation directly as algebra expresses magnitude directly." Leibniz, Gottfried. 1976 [1679]. "Letter to Christian Huygens (8 September 1679)." In Philosophical Papers and Letters (2nd ed.). Springer.) of creating an algebra that mirrors the movements and projections of objects in 3-dimensional space.

Moreover, Clifford's algebraic schema extends to higher dimensions. The algebraic operations have the same symbolic form as they do in 2 or 3-dimensions. The importance of general Clifford algebras has grown over time, while their isomorphism classes - as real algebras - have been identified in other mathematical systems beyond simply the quaternions.

The realms of real analysis and complex analysis have been expanded through the algebra H of quaternions, thanks to its notion of a three-dimensional sphere embedded in a four-dimensional space. Quaternion versors, which inhabit this 3-sphere, provide a representation of the rotation group SO(3). Clifford noted that Hamilton's biquaternions were a tensor product $H \otimes C$ of known algebras, and proposed instead two other tensor products of H: Clifford argued that the "scalars" taken from the complex numbers C might instead be taken from split-complex numbers D or from the dual numbers N. In terms of tensor products, $H \otimes D$ produces split-biquaternions, while $H \otimes N$ forms dual quaternions. The algebra of dual quaternions is used to express screw displacement, a common mapping in kinematics.

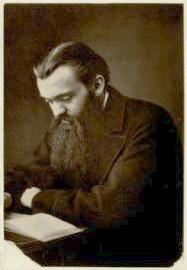
William Kingdon Clifford (1901), as shown on the frontispiece of Lectures and Essays, vol. 2.

== Philosophy ==
As a philosopher, Clifford's name is chiefly associated with two phrases of his coining, mind-stuff and the tribal self. The former symbolizes his metaphysical conception, suggested to him by his reading of Baruch Spinoza, which Clifford (1878) defined as follows:

That element of which, as we have seen, even the simplest feeling is a complex, I shall call Mind-stuff. A moving molecule of inorganic matter does not possess mind or consciousness; but it possesses a small piece of mind-stuff. When molecules are so combined together as to form the film on the under side of a jelly-fish, the elements of mind-stuff which go along with them are so combined as to form the faint beginnings of Sentience. When the molecules are so combined as to form the brain and nervous system of a vertebrate, the corresponding elements of mind-stuff are so combined as to form some kind of consciousness; that is to say, changes in the complex which take place at the same time get so linked together that the repetition of one implies the repetition of the other. When matter takes the complex form of a living human brain, the corresponding mind-stuff takes the form of a human consciousness, having intelligence and volition.

— "On the Nature of Things-in-Themselves" (1878)

Regarding Clifford's concept, Sir Frederick Pollock wrote:

Briefly put, the conception is that mind is the one ultimate reality; not mind as we know it in the complex forms of conscious feeling and thought, but the simpler elements out of which thought and feeling are built up. The hypothetical ultimate element of mind, or atom of mind-stuff, precisely corresponds to the hypothetical atom of matter, being the ultimate fact of which the material atom is the phenomenon. Matter and the sensible universe are the relations between particular organisms, that is, mind organized into consciousness, and the rest of the world. This leads to results which would in a loose and popular sense be called materialist. But the theory must, as a metaphysical theory, be reckoned on the idealist side. To speak technically, it is an idealist monism.

Tribal self, on the other hand, gives the key to Clifford's ethical view, which explains conscience and the moral law by the development in each individual of a 'self,' which prescribes the conduct conducive to the welfare of the 'tribe.' Much of Clifford's contemporary prominence was due to his attitude toward religion. Animated by an intense love of his conception of truth and devotion to public duty, he waged war on such ecclesiastical systems as seemed to him to favour obscurantism, and to put the claims of sect above those of human society. The alarm was greater, as theology was still unreconciled with Darwinism; and Clifford was regarded as a dangerous champion of the anti-spiritual tendencies then imputed to modern science. There has also been debate on the extent to which Clifford's doctrine of 'concomitance' or 'psychophysical parallelism' influenced John Hughlings Jackson's model of the nervous system and, through him, the work of Janet, Freud, Ribot, and Ey.

=== Ethics ===
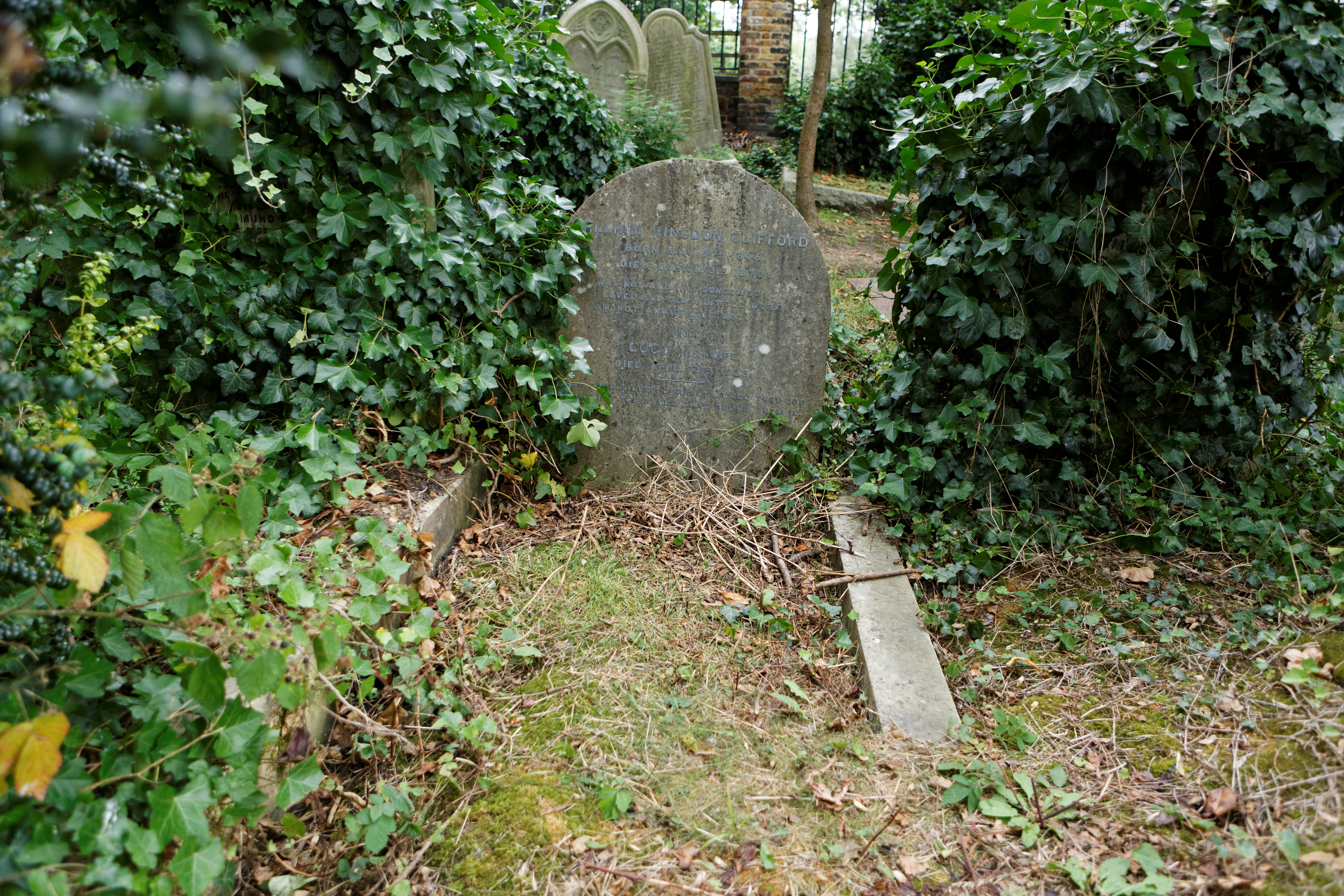
The grave in Highgate Cemetery - East - of William Kingdon Clifford, just north of the grave of Karl Marx.

In his 1877 essay, The Ethics of Belief, Clifford argues that it is immoral to believe things for which one lacks evidence. He describes a ship-owner who planned to send to sea an old and not well-built ship full of passengers. The ship-owner had doubts suggested to him that the ship might not be seaworthy: "These doubts preyed upon his mind, and made him unhappy." He considered having the ship refitted even though it would be expensive. At last, "he succeeded in overcoming these melancholy reflections." He watched the ship depart, "with a light heart…and he got his insurance money when she went down in mid-ocean and told no tales."

Clifford argues that the ship-owner was guilty of the deaths of the passengers even though he sincerely believed the ship was sound: "[H]e had no right to believe on such evidence as was before him." (Note: The italics are in the original.) Moreover, he contends that even in the case where the ship successfully reaches the destination, the decision remains immoral, because the morality of the choice is defined forever once the choice is made, and actual outcome, defined by blind chance, doesn't matter. The ship-owner would be no less guilty: his wrongdoing would never be discovered, but he still had no right to make that decision given the information available to him at the time.

Clifford famously concludes with what has come to be known as Clifford's principle: "it is wrong always, everywhere, and for anyone, to believe anything upon insufficient evidence."

As such, he is arguing in direct opposition to religious thinkers for whom 'blind faith' (i.e. belief in things in spite of the lack of evidence for them) was a virtue. This paper was famously attacked by pragmatist philosopher William James in his "Will to Believe" lecture. Often these two works are read and published together as touchstones for the debate over evidentialism, faith, and overbelief.

== Premonition of relativity ==
Though Clifford never constructed a full theory of spacetime and relativity, there are some remarkable observations he made in print that foreshadowed these modern concepts: In his book Elements of Dynamic (1878), he introduced "quasi-harmonic motion in a hyperbola". He wrote an expression for a parametrized unit hyperbola, which other authors later used as a model for relativistic velocity. Elsewhere he states:

The geometry of rotors and motors…forms the basis of the whole modern theory of the relative rest (Static) and the relative motion (Kinematic and Kinetic) of invariable systems. (Note: This passage is immediately followed by a section on "The bending of space." However, according to the preface (p.vii), this section was written by Karl Pearson)

This passage makes reference to biquaternions, though Clifford made these into split-biquaternions as his independent development. The book continues with a chapter "On the bending of space", the substance of general relativity. Clifford also discussed his views in On the Space-Theory of Matter in 1876.

In 1910, William Barrett Frankland quoted the Space-Theory of Matter in his book on parallelism: "The boldness of this speculation is surely unexcelled in the history of thought. Up to the present, however, it presents the appearance of an Icarian flight." Years later, after general relativity had been advanced by Albert Einstein, various authors noted that Clifford had anticipated Einstein. Hermann Weyl (1923), for instance, mentioned Clifford as one of those who, like Bernhard Riemann, anticipated the geometric ideas of relativity.

In 1940, Eric Temple Bell published The Development of Mathematics, in which he discusses the prescience of Clifford on relativity:

Bolder even than Riemann, Clifford confessed his belief (1870) that matter is only a manifestation of curvature in a space-time manifold. This embryonic divination has been acclaimed as an anticipation of Einstein's (1915–16) relativistic theory of the gravitational field. The actual theory, however, bears but slight resemblance to Clifford's rather detailed creed. As a rule, those mathematical prophets who never descend to particulars make the top scores. Almost anyone can hit the side of a barn at forty yards with a charge of buckshot.

John Archibald Wheeler, during the 1960 International Congress for Logic, Methodology, and Philosophy of Science (CLMPS) at Stanford, introduced his geometrodynamics formulation of general relativity by crediting Clifford as the initiator.

In The Natural Philosophy of Time (1961), Gerald James Whitrow recalls Clifford's prescience, quoting him in order to describe the Friedmann–Lemaître–Robertson–Walker metric in cosmology.

Cornelius Lanczos (1970) summarizes Clifford's premonitions:

[He] with great ingenuity foresaw in a qualitative fashion that physical matter might be conceived as a curved ripple on a generally flat plane. Many of his ingenious hunches were later realized in Einstein's gravitational theory. Such speculations were automatically premature and could not lead to anything constructive without an intermediate link which demanded the extension of 3-dimensional geometry to the inclusion of time. The theory of curved spaces had to be preceded by the realization that space and time form a single four-dimensional entity.

Likewise, Banesh Hoffmann (1973) writes:

Riemann, and more specifically Clifford, conjectured that forces and matter might be local irregularities in the curvature of space, and in this they were strikingly prophetic, though for their pains they were dismissed at the time as visionaries.

In 1990, Ruth Farwell and Christopher Knee examined the record on acknowledgement of Clifford's foresight. They conclude that "it was Clifford, not Riemann, who anticipated some of the conceptual ideas of General Relativity." To explain the lack of recognition of Clifford's prescience, they point out that he was an expert in metric geometry, and "metric geometry was too challenging to orthodox epistemology to be pursued." In 1992, Farwell and Knee continued their study of Clifford and Riemann:

[They] hold that once tensors had been used in the theory of general relativity, the framework existed in which a geometrical perspective in physics could be developed and allowed the challenging geometrical conceptions of Riemann and Clifford to be rediscovered.

== Collections ==
University College London Special Collections holds a portfolio of Clifford's mathematical fragments and letters from Clifford discussing religion.

== Selected writings ==
- 1872. On the aims and instruments of scientific thought, 524–41.
- 1876 [1870]. On the Space-Theory of Matter.
- 1877. "The Ethics of Belief." Contemporary Review 29:289.
- 1878. Elements of Dynamic: An Introduction to the Study of Motion And Rest In Solid And Fluid Bodies.
  - Book I: "Translations"
  - Book II: "Rotations"
  - Book III: "Strains"
- 1878. "Applications of Grassmann's Extensive Algebra." American Journal of Mathematics 1(4):353.
- 1879: Seeing and Thinking—includes four popular science lectures:
  - "The Eye and the Brain"
  - "The Eye and Seeing"
  - "The Brain and Thinking"
  - "Of Boundaries in General"
- 1879. Lectures and Essays I & II, with an introduction by Sir Frederick Pollock.
- 1881. "Mathematical fragments" (facsimiles).
- 1882. Mathematical Papers, edited by Robert Tucker, with an introduction by Henry J. S. Smith.
- 1885. The Common Sense of the Exact Sciences, completed by Karl Pearson.
- 1887. Elements of Dynamic 2.
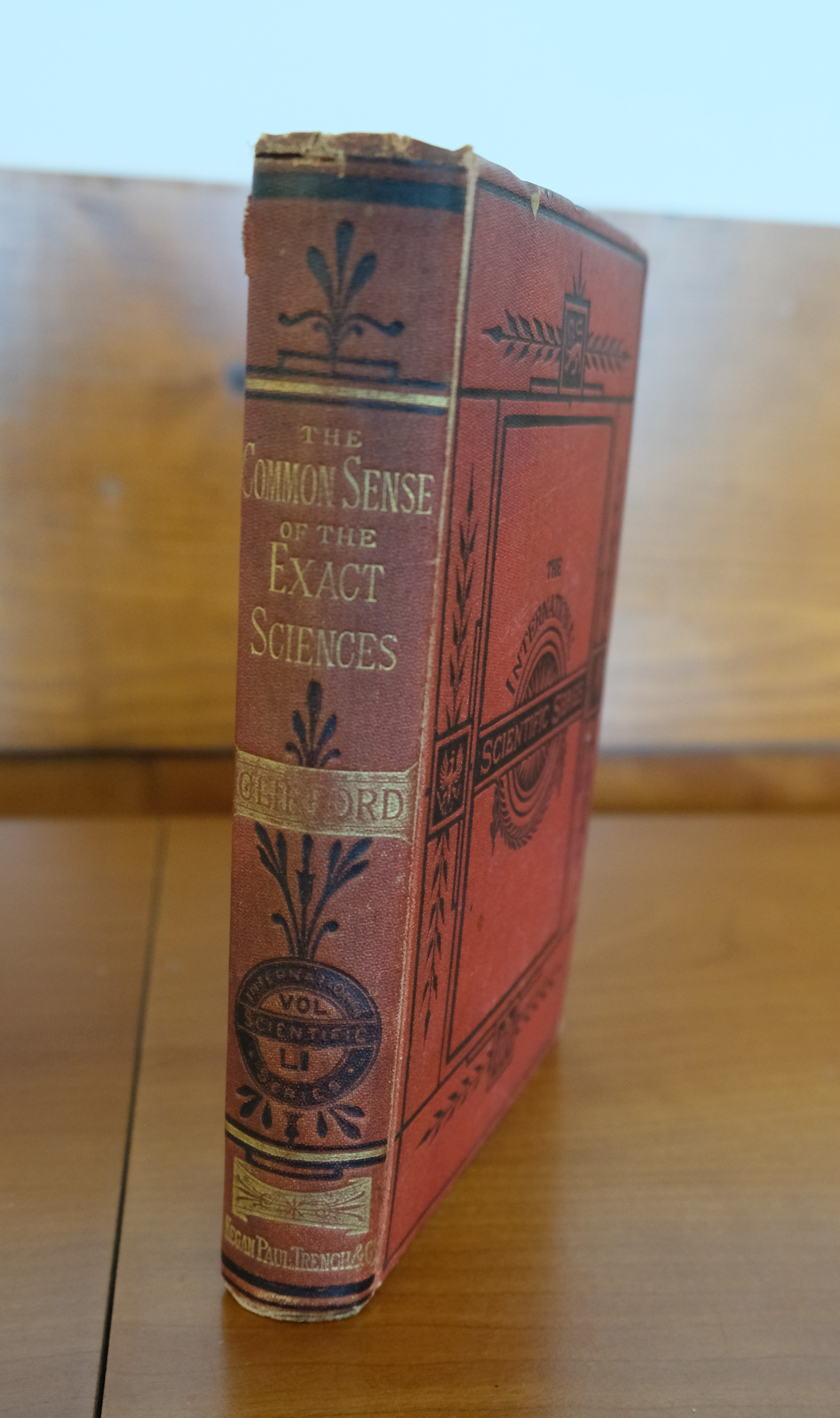
1885 copy of "The Common Sense of the Exact Sciences"

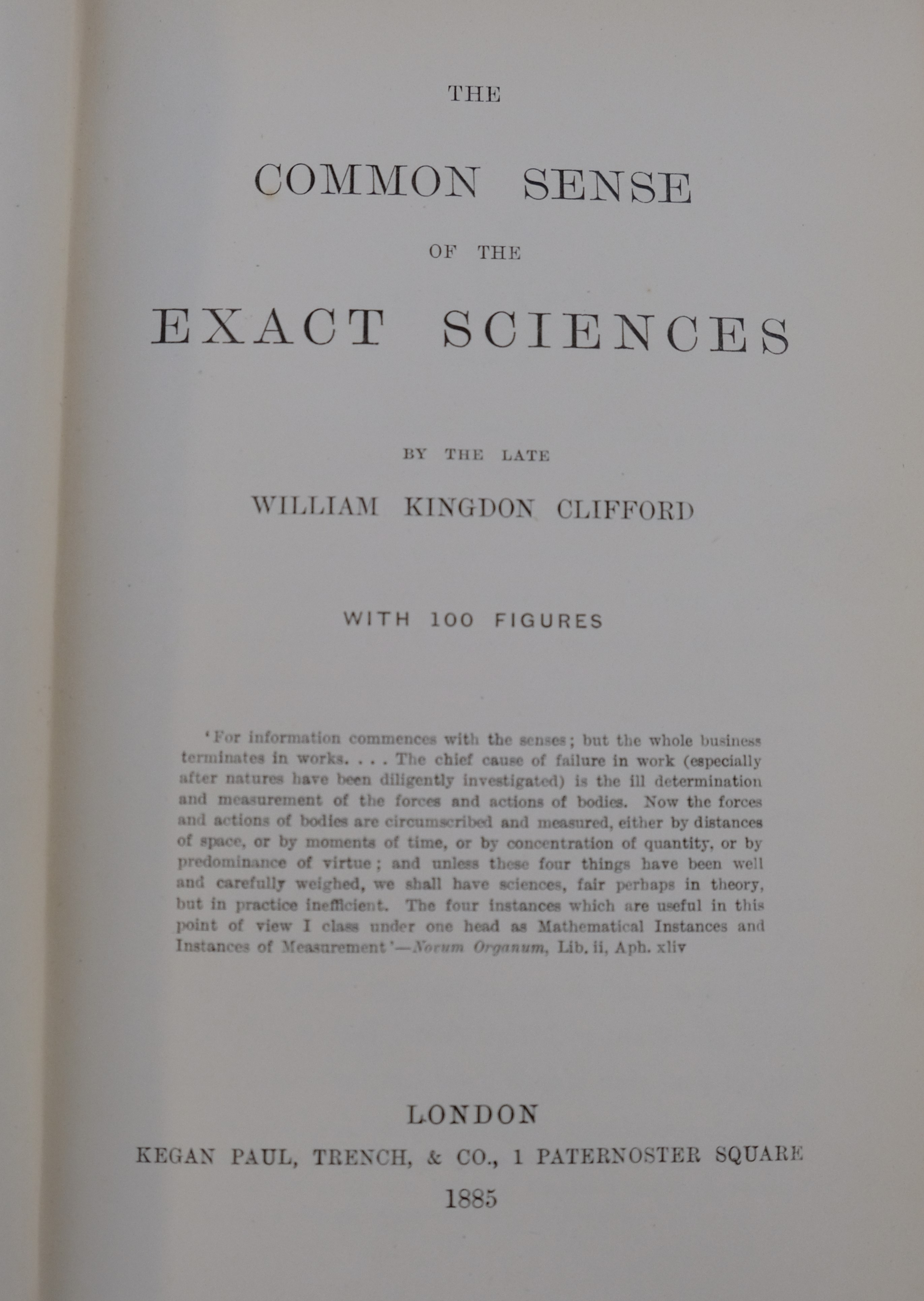
Title page of an 1885 copy of "The Common Sense of the Exact Sciences"

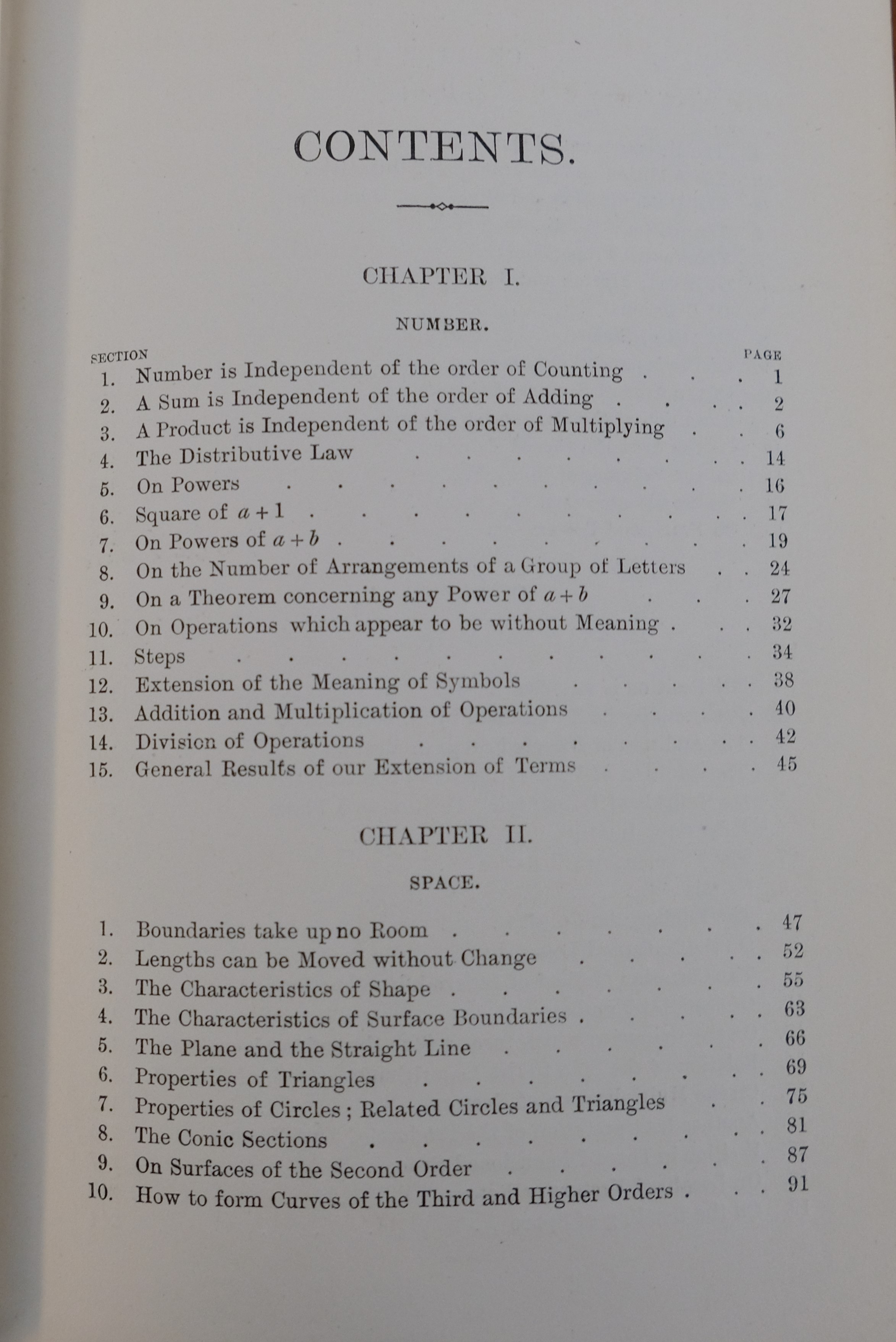
Table of contents page for an 1885 copy of "The Common Sense of the Exact Sciences"

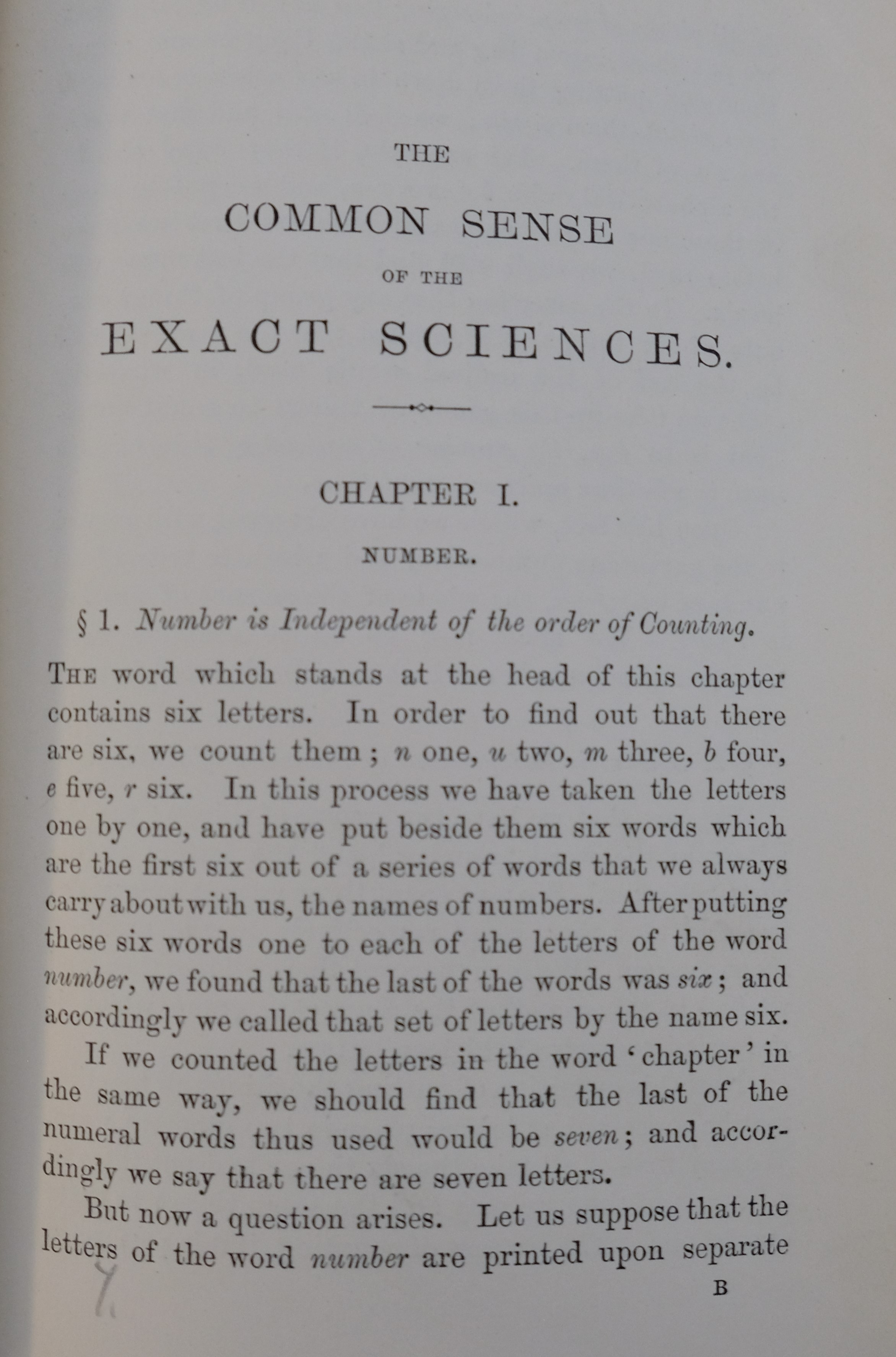
First page of an 1885 copy of "The Common Sense of the Exact Sciences"

== See also ==
- Bessel–Clifford function
- Clifford's principle
- Clifford analysis
- Clifford gates
- Clifford bundle
- Clifford module
- Clifford number
- Motor
- Rotor
- Simplex
- Split-biquaternion
- Will to Believe Doctrine
