= Elements of Dynamic =

1878 scientific reference book by William Kingdon Clifford

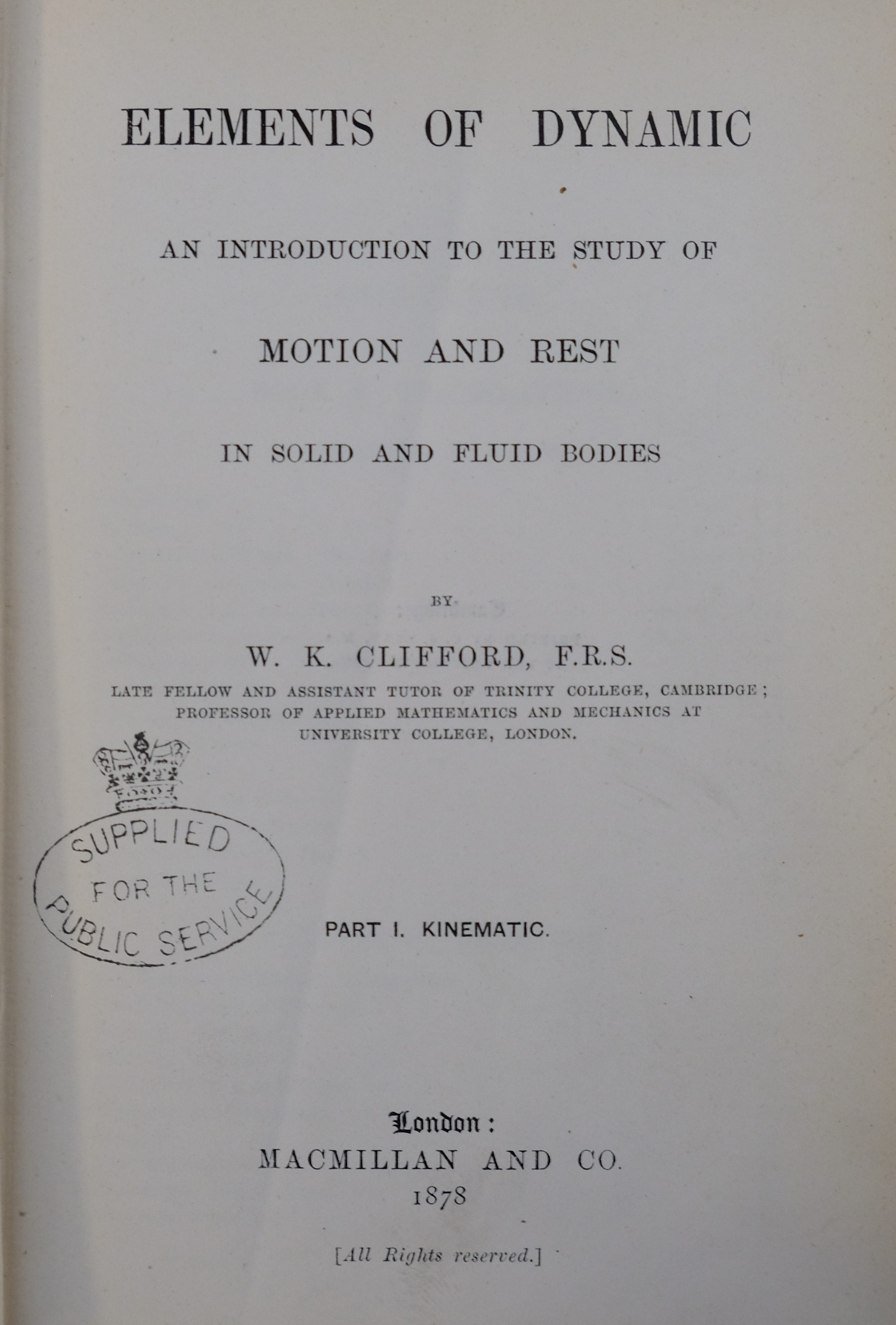
Title page of Volume 1 (1878) containing books I-III of Clifford's "Elements of Dynamic"

Elements of Dynamic is a book published by William Kingdon Clifford in 1878. In 1887 it was supplemented by a fourth part and an appendix. The subtitle is "An introduction to motion and rest in solid and fluid bodies". It was reviewed positively, has remained a standard reference since its appearance, and is now available online as a Historical Math Monograph from Cornell University.

On page 95 Clifford deconstructed the quaternion product of William Rowan Hamilton into two separate products of two vectors: vector product and scalar product. This separation of the quaternion product into two was followed by J. W. Gibbs in his development of vector analysis, first in a pamphlet acknowledging Clifford's Kinematic, and later in a textbook published by Yale University, called Vector Analysis. He apparently remained unaware of Clifford's seminal paper on the unification of these two products into what he termed a geometric algebra.

Elements of Dynamic was the debut of the term cross-ratio for a four-argument function frequently used in geometry.

Clifford uses the term twist to discuss (pages 126 to 131) the screw theory that had recently been introduced by Robert Stawell Ball.

The operation on vectors by matrix multiplication was given with
$$\phi = \begin{pmatrix}a & h \\ h' & b \end{pmatrix}$$
on page 163.

== Reviews ==
A review in the Philosophical Magazine explained for prospective readers that kinematics is the "study of the theory of pure motion". Noting the nature of "progressive training" required for mathematics, the reviewer wondered "For what class of readers is the book designed?"

Richard A. Proctor noted in The Contemporary Review (33:65) that there are "few errors in the work, and even misprints are few and far between for a treatise of this kind." He did not approve of Clifford's coining of "odd new words as squirts, sinks, twists, and whirls." Proctor quoted the last sentence of the book: "Every continuous motion of an infinite body may be built up of squirts and vortices."

In a "Sketch of Professor Clifford" in June 1879 the journal Popular Science said "It will probably not take high rank as a university text-book, for which it was intended, but is much admired by mathematicians for the elegance, freshness, and originality displayed in the treatment of mathematical problems."

After Clifford had died, and Book IV and Appendix were published in 1887, the literary magazine Athenaeum said "we have here Clifford pure and simple." It explained that he "had entirely shaken off the concept of force as an explanatory cause." It also expressed "the oft-told regret that Clifford did not live to reshape the teaching of elementary dynamics in this country, and we wait somewhat impatiently for his successor in this labour, who seems long in appearing."

In 1901 Alexander Macfarlane spoke at Lehigh University on Clifford. Reviewing Elements of Dynamic he said

The work is unique for the clear ideas given of the science; ideas and principles are more prominent than symbols and formulae. He takes such familiar words as spin, twist, squirt, whirl, and gives them exact meaning. The book is an example of what he meant by scientific insight,...

In 2004 Gowan Dawson reviewed the situation of the book's publication. On the basis of a letter from Lucy Clifford to Alexander MacMillan, the publisher, Dawson wrote

Clifford, by the time of his death, had published just a single monograph, The Elements of Dynamic, and that had been rushed through the presses in an incomplete form only during the last months of his life. Clifford's standing as both a leading mathematical specialist and an iconoclastic scientific publicist had instead been forged largely in the pages of the Victorian periodical press...

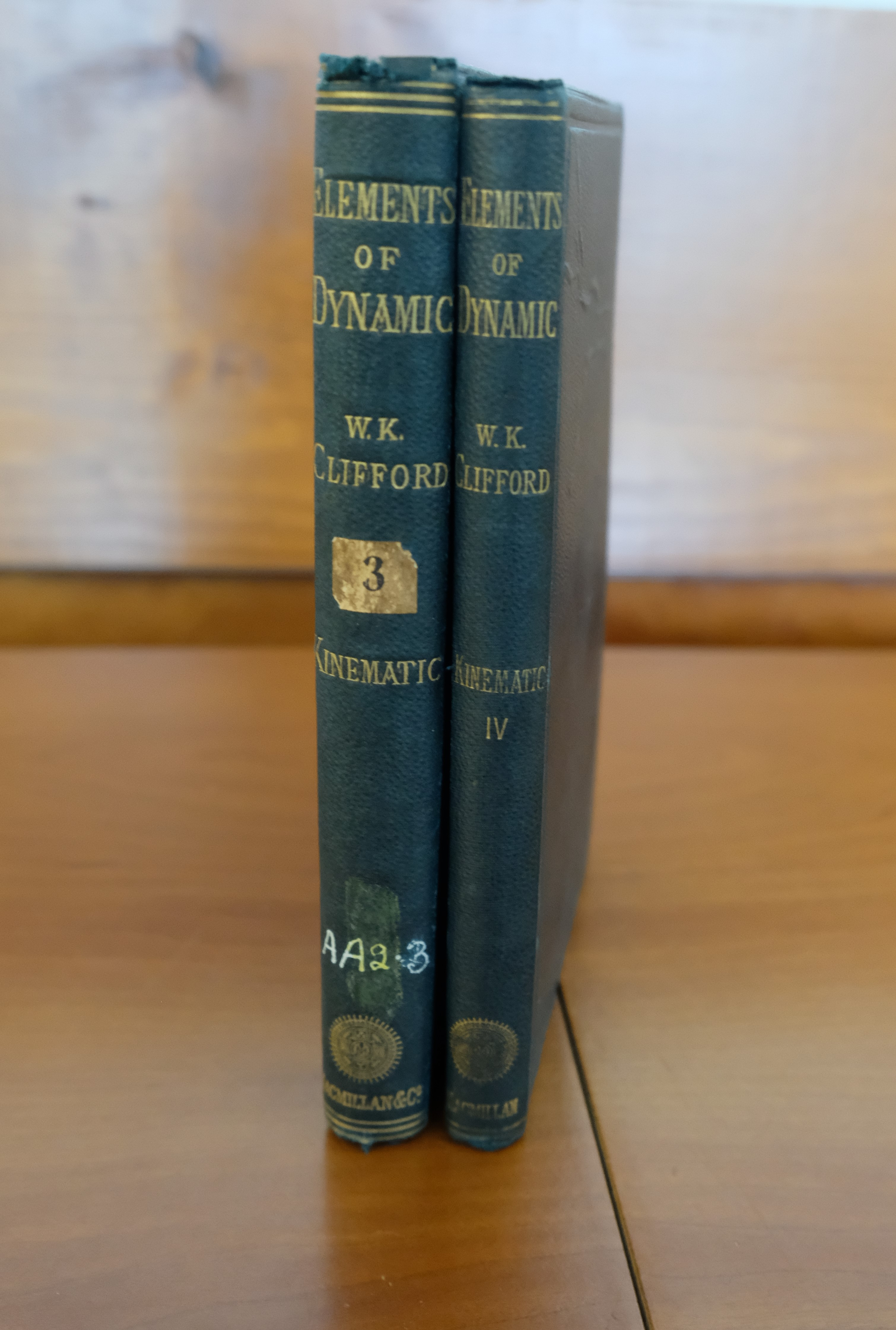
Volume 1 (1878) containing books I-III and Volume 2 containing book IV (1887) of Clifford's "Elements of Dynamic"

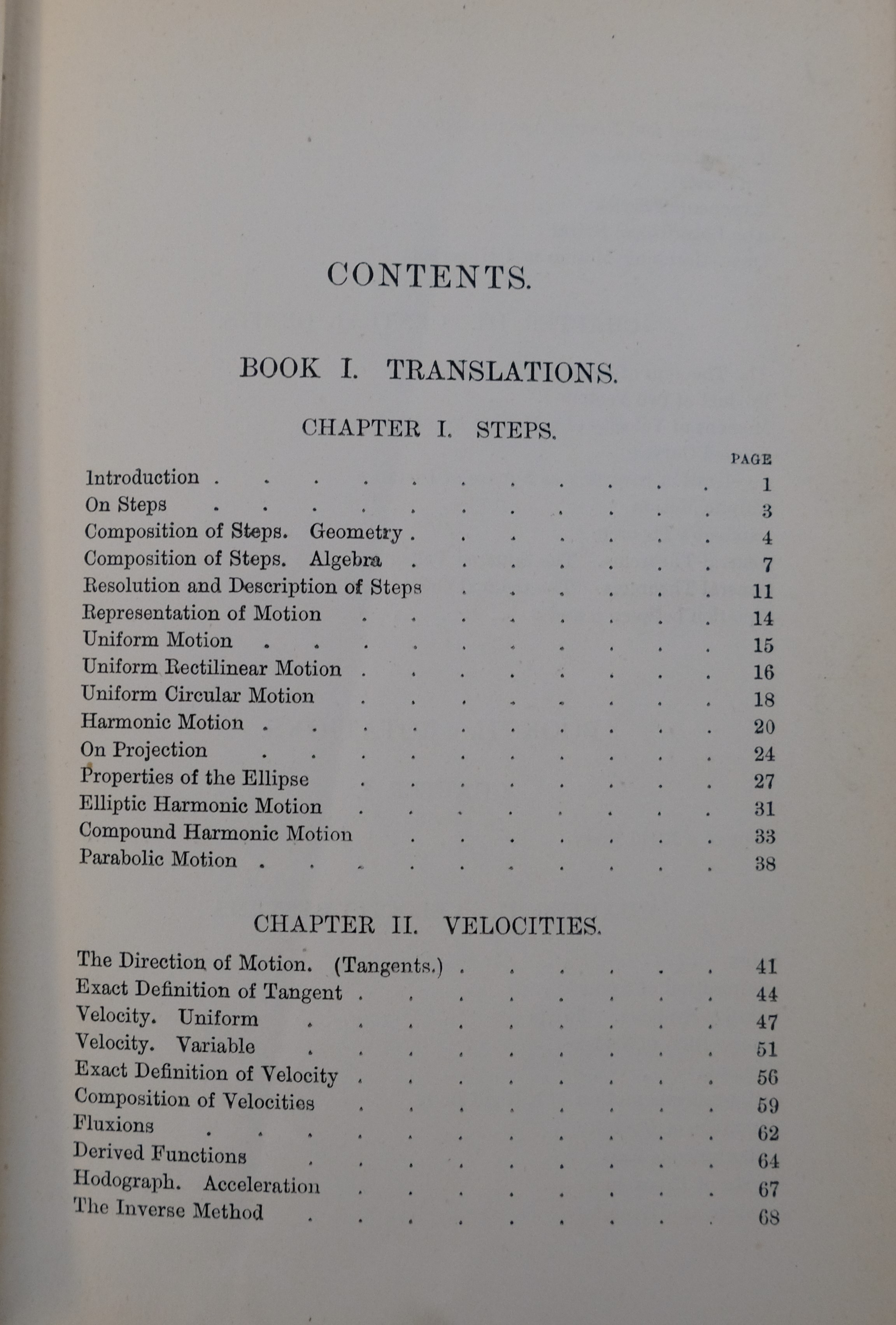
Table of contents page of Volume 1 (1878) containing books I-III of Clifford's "Elements of Dynamic"

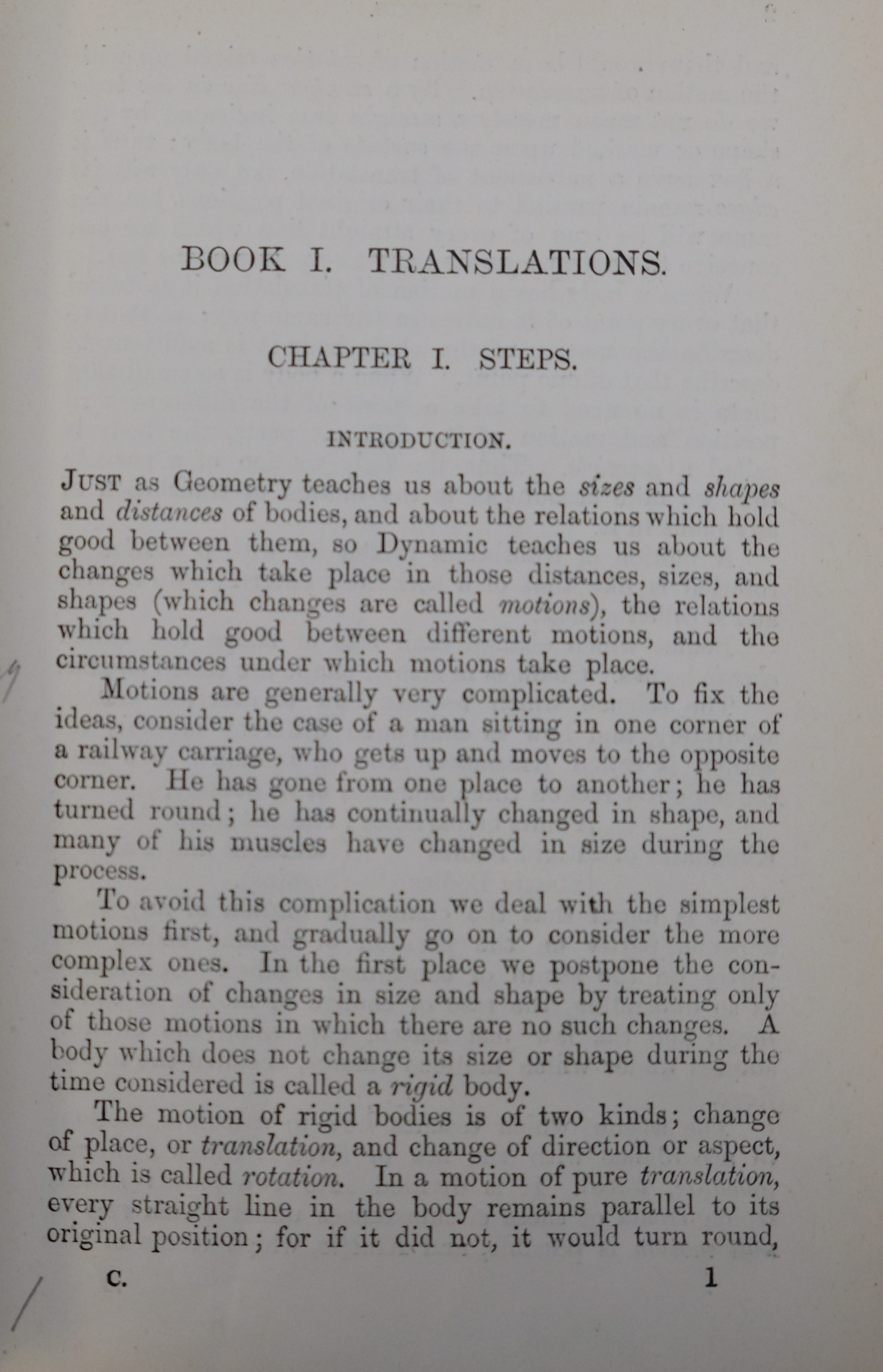
First page of Volume 1 (1878) containing books I-III of Clifford's "Elements of Dynamic"
