= Powers: A Study in Metaphysics =

2003 metaphysics book by George Molnar

- Author: George Molnar; Stephen Mumford
- Language: English
- Genre: Philosophy
- Publication date: 2003

Powers: A Study in Metaphysics is a philosophical book written by George Molnar and published posthumously in 2003. After Molnar's death, the book was completed by Stephen Mumford who had been contacted by Molnar's former partner to finish the book. David Malet Armstrong provided a brief preface and Mumford provided an introduction to provide the introductory context that was missing in Molnar's unfinished manuscript.

In Powers, Molnar argues that dispositional properties exist—that is, a disposition for, say, a wine glass to break when dropped is a property that is instantiated in the object itself (either as a universal or as a trope)—Molnar refers to these properties as powers. The primary competing view draws from David Hume, simply seeing dispositions or powers as having no metaphysical backing and sentences expressing disposition-like behaviour can simply be reduced to an expression of a conditional truth: if you drop the wine glass, it will break.

The book was well received by Timothy O'Connor in Notre Dame Philosophical Reviews, who praised the book’s "scope and clarity of argument" while noting that it was "sketchy at some points, but this is a forgivable consequence of high ambition and (to a degree of which we cannot be certain) untimely death."
