= George Molnar (philosopher) =

Hungarian-born philosopher

George Molnar (1934–1999) was a Hungarian-born philosopher whose principal area of interest was metaphysics. He worked mainly in the Philosophy Department at the University of Sydney but resided in England from 1976 to 1982. He published four philosophical papers in two separate spells; the first two in the 1960s and the second two after a return to the profession in the 1990s. His book Powers: A Study in Metaphysics was published posthumously in 2003.

== Early life ==
Molnar was a Holocaust survivor. His parents were middle-class Jews resident in Budapest. His father Imre deserted baby George and his mother Rosa before World War II and emigrated to Australia with his secretary Mimi, leaving them in Budapest during the Nazi occupation and the Siege of Budapest. Rosa and George escaped from Hungary after the war in 1949 and were stateless refugees in Europe until 1951 when they arrived in Australia.

== Education ==
Molnar studied economics at the University of Sydney and switched to philosophy in his final year, under the Australian realist philosopher John Anderson. He was later to be appointed as John Anderson Senior Research Fellow.

== Career ==
In the 1950s and 1960s Molnar was a prominent member of the Libertarian Society at Sydney University and an influential academic member of the Sydney Push. Along with philosophers David J. Ivison, Roelof Smilde, Darcy Waters and Jim Baker, Molnar was a contributor to the libertarian Broadsheet.

Molnar's writing was published in the British anarchist periodicals Freedom and Anarchy in the late 1950s and early 1960s. In a 1961 article in Anarchy, he argued that an anarchist society was probably impossible, and that the anarchist movement ought to aim to be a "permanent opposition" to authoritarian forces in society.

Philosophers and libertarians who frequented the racecourse knew Molnar as a fervid gambler. His other interests included philately and early Australian colonial history (particularly the railway systems). At various times he was a taxi-driver, tram-conductor, union advocate and public servant.

In the 1970s Molnar was active in philosophy department disturbances. He taught philosophy at Sydney University until he resigned in 1976 and moved to the UK. While living in a libertarian-style commune in Leeds, according to contemporary activist Max Farrar, Molnar became a member of the Marxist movement Big Flame.

In 1982 he returned to Sydney, joined the Department of Veterans' Affairs and became active in the Administrative and Clerical Officers Association (ACOA), later returning to Sydney University as a part-time tutor.

== Publications ==
An infrequent but influential publisher of articles and material, Molnar was working on a book at the time of his death. He was in email contact with Stephen Mumford at the University of Nottingham, who acted as archivist of his work, edited the book and saw it through to publication in 2003 under the title Powers: A Study in Metaphysics, with a foreword by David Armstrong. Its publisher, Oxford University Press, wrote "This is contemporary metaphysics of the highest quality."

In 2019 a collection of 19 personal memoirs was published under the title George Molnar: Politics and Passions of a Sydney Philosopher, collated and edited by his partner of 20 years Carlotta McIntosh.

== Bibliography ==
=== Books ===
- Molnar, George. Powers: A Study in Metaphysics, edited by Stephen Mumford, Oxford University Press, 2003

=== Articles ===
- "Sexual Freedom in the Orr Case", Australian Highway 41 (3) (June 1960): pp. 54–5
- "The Nature of Moralism", Sydney Libertarians Broadsheet 48, May 1966, pp. 1–4
- "The Sexual Revolution", Sydney Libertarians Broadsheet 39, September 1964, pp. 1–5
- "Space, Time and the Proposition" (Molnar's edition of the Anderson lectures on Alexander), Sydney University Press, 2005
- "Defeasible Propositions", Australian Journal of Philosophy 45 (1967), pp. 185–97
- "Kneale's Article Revisited", Philosophical Review 78 (1969), pp. 79–89
- "Are Dispositions Reducible?", Philosophical Quarterly 49 (1999), pp. 1–17
- "Truthmakers for Negative Truths", Australasian Journal of Philosophy 78 (2000), pp. 72–86
