= Popper and After =

1982 book by David Stove

- Cover of the first edition
- Author: David Stove
- Original title: Popper and After
- Language: English
- Subject: Philosophy of science
- Publisher: Pergamon Press
- Publication date: 1982
- Publication place: Australia
- Media type: Print (Hardcover)
- Pages: 128
- ISBN: 978-0-08-026791-3
- OCLC: 8996891
- Dewey Decimal: 501 19
- LC Class: Q175 .S83 1982

Popper and After: Four Modern Irrationalists is a book about irrationalism by the philosopher David Stove. First published by Pergamon Press in 1982, it has since been reprinted as Anything Goes: Origins of the Cult of Scientific Irrationalism and Scientific Irrationalism: Origins of a Postmodern Cult.

== Part one ==
How Irrationalism About Science is Made Credible

=== Neutralizing Success-Words ===
Stove starts chapter one by clarifying the sort of view that would uncontroversially constitute an irrationalist position regarding science.

Much more is known now than was known fifty years ago, and much more was known then than in 1580. So there has been a great accumulation or growth of knowledge in the last four hundred years. This is an extremely well-known fact, which I will refer to as (A). A philosopher, in particular, who did not know it, would be uncommonly ignorant. So a writer whose position inclined him to deny (A), or even made him at all reluctant to admit it, would almost inevitably seem, to the philosophers who read him, to be maintaining something extremely implausible.

Stove then advances his reading of the philosophers he is criticising: "Popper, Kuhn, Lakatos, and Feyerabend, are all writers whose position inclines them to deny (A), or at least makes them more or less reluctant to admit it. (That the history of science is not "cumulative", is a point they all agree on)." Popper himself had given a 1963 summary of his thoughts the title "Conjectures and Refutations: The Growth of Scientific Knowledge", seemingly endorsing (A) in almost identical language. Nonetheless, the question Stove addresses in the chapter is "How do these writers manage to be plausible, while being reluctant to admit so well-known a truth as (A)?"

A general answer to this question is offered: "the constant tendency in these authors to conflate questions of fact with questions of logical value, or the history with the philosophy of science." Stove claims this tendency is "widely recognized", but waives both this general answer (and its supporters) in favour of seeking a more specific account.

Stove's first step in refining the general answer is observing what he calls mixed strategy writing in the authors he is examining. He uses this expression, since it is not always clear to him whether the writing expresses "equivocation" or "inconsistency". What is common to the examples Stove offers is that something well-known is mixed with something extraordinary, without the clash being resolved; the "irrationalism" is introduced simultaneously with orthodoxy, rendering it more plausible to the reader—disbelief is suspended.

A straightforward example is provided by Thomas Kuhn's description of "paradigm shift", where he asserts the well-known fact that the world is the same after "paradigm shift" as before. Yet, at the same time, Kuhn also suggests that solutions to problems achieved under old paradigms are lost, redundant or "un-solutions" under new paradigms—denial of (A) above.

Examining Kuhn's use of the word solution more closely, Stove notes that Kuhn sometimes uses it in the ordinary way regarding practical knowledge, but at other times in a weaker sense, specific to Kuhn's theory, that a solution is relative to a paradigm, people, place and time. This equivocation on solution actually provides Stove with an answer of exactly the type he was looking for. All his authors, with many similar words, show similar equivocation. Stove lists knowledge, discovery, facts, verified, understanding, explanation and notes the list is far from complete. Idiosyncratic weak senses of these words are a characteristic of the writing of his subjects that explains clearly how a reader, presuming ordinary use of language, might believe them to be expressing something more orthodox than is, in fact, their intention.

At this point, Stove coins the expression neutralizing success words and provides an uncontroversial example from everyday language to illustrate it.

Nowadays in Australia a journalist will often write such a sentence as, "The Minister today refuted allegations that he had misled Parliament", when all he means is that the Minister denied these allegations. "To refute" is a verb with 'success-grammar' (in Ryle's sense). To say the Minister refuted the allegations is to ascribe to him a certain cognitive achievement: that of showing the allegations to be false. "To deny", on the other hand, has no success-grammar. So a journalist who used "refuted" when all he meant was "denied" has used a success-word, but without intending to convey the idea of success, of cognitive achievement, which is part of the word's meaning. He has neutralized a success-word [emphasis original].

Stove also provides a quote from Paul Feyerabend explicitly directing his readers to "neutralize" his success words or not, according to their own preferences.

My frequent use of such words as 'progress', 'advance', 'improvement' etc., does not mean that I claim to possess special knowledge about what is good and what is bad in the sciences and that I want to impose this knowledge upon my readers. Everyone can read the terms in his own way and in accordance with the tradition to which he belongs [emphasis original].

=== Sabotaging Logical Expressions ===
Chapter two begins with the following, precisely worded definition of logical expression.

I will call a statement a "logical" one, or a "statement of logic" if and only if it implies something about what the logical relation is between certain propositions; and the word or phrase, in virtue of which it has this implication, I will call a "logical expression".

Stove notes that logical expressions can be sabotaged, just as success-words can be neutralized. He spends some time clarifying the relationship between these phenomena, since they are similar in intention but not, in fact, identical. Rather, they work together in the following way.

The use of success-words (though neutralized), is of course a device which makes directly for plausibility. Sabotaging logical expressions does not do this, but it is an essential auxiliary to the first device. A writer who often took the implication of truth out of "proved", but never the implication of entailment out of "proof", or who often took the implication of falsity out of "refuted" but never took the implication of inconsistency out of "refutation", would be in a position hopelessly exposed to criticism. Our authors have not been so careless.

He also articulates the distinction in an informal (and wittily expressed) way, that sabotaging logical expressions is like derailing cognitive achievement en route, so that it can never arrive anywhere; while neutralizing success-words is more like blowing up any cognitive achievement at the destination, so it can never be recognized as having arrived.

Stove now presents a common method of sabotaging logical expressions in a generalizable form.

One way to sabotage a logical expression, and the way which is most common in our authors, is to embed a logical statement in a context which can be broadly described as epistemic. A schematic example, and one not likely to occur in our authors, is this: instead of saying "P entails Q", which is of course a logical statement, to say "P entails Q according to most logicians, ancient, medieval, and modern".

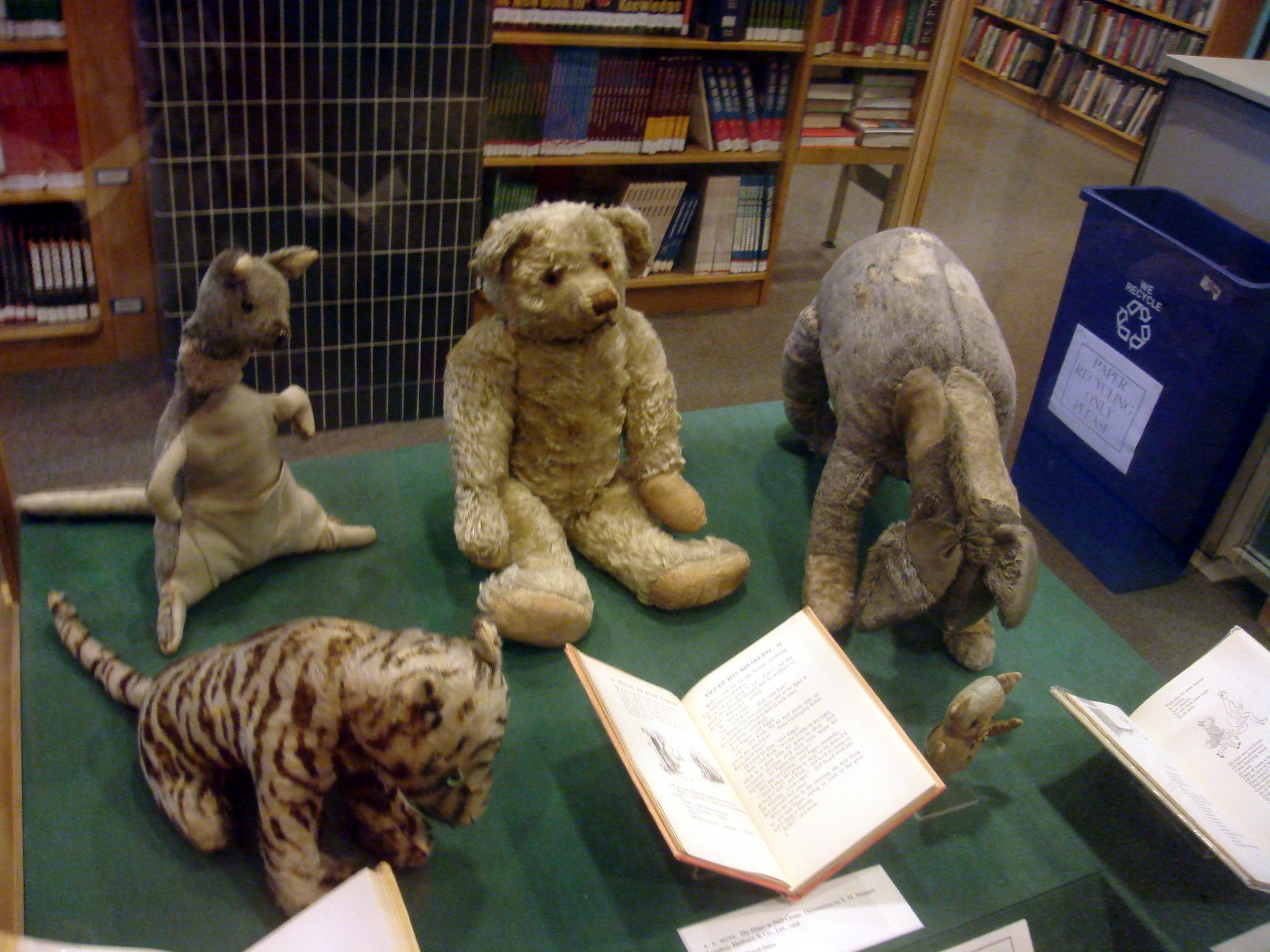
Pooh and friends

This simple pattern of expression makes historical rather than logical assertions (like an encyclopedia documenting debate, without making any truth-claims about what is said, only that it was said, see de dicto and de re).

Example:
- Eeyore: Kanga told me Winnie-the-Pooh said, "Pigs can fly."
- Piglet: Well, do you believe it?
- Eeyore: Yes I do, that's exactly the kind of thing Pooh would say. [de dicto] OR
- Eeyore: I don't know, you tell me, you're a pig. [de re]

Knowledge about what people say is different to knowledge about the matters they discuss. Stove accuses his subjects of making statements about scientific discourse, when their readers expect statements about the science itself.

== Part two ==
How irrationalism about science began

=== The historical source located ===
Stove notes that in part one he has only demonstrated how an irrational position might be expressed, in such a way as it had some appearance of credibility, not that such a position is actually held by the subjects of his study. He now turns to establishing this second point. The philosophers he is criticising not only use language in unusual ways, but do indeed also make plain language assertions of an irrationalist nature. Stove presents examples of what he believes are the clearest statements of irrationalism in their writing. Ultimately he considers providing examples from Karl Popper suffices. He presents the quotes and paraphrases apparently in ascending order of irrationality.

- "There are no such things as good positive reasons."

- "Positive reasons are neither necessary nor possible."
- A scientific theory is, not only never certain, but never even probable, in relation to the evidence for it.
- A scientific theory cannot be more probable, in relation to the empirical evidence for it, than it is a priori, or in the absence of all empirical evidence.
- The truth of any scientific theory or law-statement is exactly as improbable, both a priori and in relation to any possible evidence, as the truth of a self-contradictory proposition.
- "Belief, of course, is never rational: it is rational to suspend belief."

Stove seems to restrain his witticisms in the course of presenting the evidence above. However, as he presents the last quote, he appears to experience his astonishment at such a statement as though again for the first time, expressing this via his characteristically barbed wit. Not only could Popper bring himself to make the last assertion, he is sufficiently comfortable with it to supply of course. Not only does Popper consider belief to be irrational, he considers this to be common knowledge!

Returning to serious analysis, Stove next presents Popper's own explicit endorsement of David Hume's scepticism regarding induction.

- "I agree with Hume's opinion that induction is invalid and in no sense justified."
- "Are we rationally justified in reasoning from repeated instances of which we have experience to instances of which we have had no experience? Hume's unrelenting answer is: No, we are not justified. ... My own view is that Hume's answer to this problem is right."; and compare, This explains where many of Popper's ideas have come from—he shares Hume's scepticism about induction.

Stove considers this establishes what he set out to show in the chapter since, "Popper's philosophy of science is at any rate not more irrationalist than that of Feyerabend, Kuhn, or Lakatos, and at the same time, as a matter of well-known history, Popper's philosophy owes nothing to theirs, while Kuhn's philosophy owes much, and the philosophy of Lakatos and Feyerabend owes nearly everything, to Popper."

However, he explains that establishing both that these writers are irrationalists, and where their irrationalism comes from historically, still leaves the question of what it is they believe that leads them to accept this irrationalist conclusion. What implicit premise grounds their confidence in such an otherwise unattractive conclusion?

=== The key premise of irrationalism identified ===
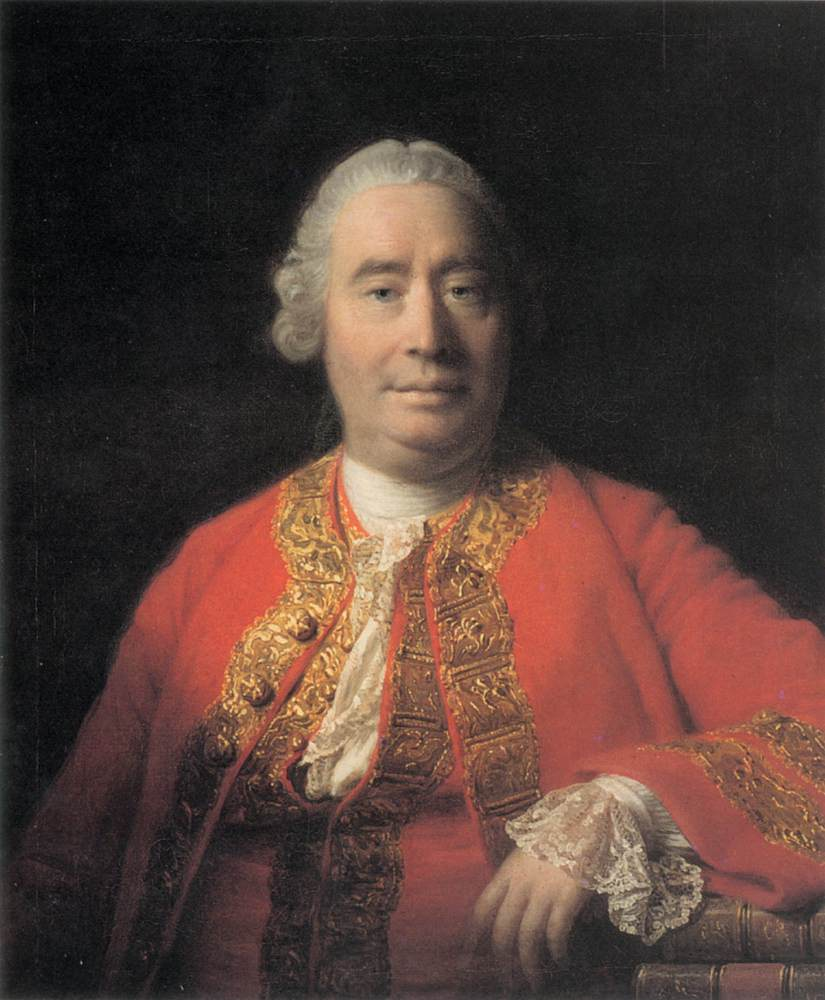
David Hume

In chapter four, Stove presents Hume's argument for scepticism about the unobserved (A in diagram and table below), quoting from three primary sources — A Treatise of Human Nature, An Abstract [of A Treatise of Human Nature] and An Enquiry concerning Human Understanding. He supports his reading by quotes from the secondary literature, where his interpretation of Hume might otherwise be challenged. He concludes that deductivism (O in diagram and table below) is the "key premise of irrationalism". In Stove's words, "Nothing fatal to empiricist philosophy of science ... follows from the admission that arguments from the observed to the unobserved are not the best; unless this assumption was combined, as it was with Hume, with the fatal assumption that only the best will do [emphasis original]." He concludes the chapter with the following diagram and table.

David Hume's scepticism per David Stove
E}
H}	E}						F}		→	M+}
J}	→	→	→	I}	F}		→	N}	O}		→	C}
}					→	M}	}						→	A
H}	→	L	→	K}	D}						}
G}	E}										→	B}
F}

A	Scepticism about the unobserved	There is no reason to believe any contingent proposition about the unobserved.
B	Empiricism	Any reason to believe a contingent proposition about the unobserved is a proposition about the observed.
C	Inductive Scepticism	No proposition about the observed is a reason to believe a contingent proposition about the observed.
D	Impotence of the a priori	No necessary truth is a reason to believe any contingent proposition.
E	Accessibles necessary or observational	A proposition is directly accessible to knowledge or reasonable belief if and only if it is either a necessary truth or a proposition about the observed.
F	Reasons must be accessible	If P is a reason or part of a reason to believe Q then P is directly accessible to knowledge or reasonable belief.
G	Induction is invalid without Resemblance	Any inductive argument is invalid, and the validator of it is a Resemblance Thesis.
H	Resemblance is a contingent feature of the Universe	A Resemblance Thesis is a contingent proposition about the unobserved.
I	Resemblance is not provable a priori	A Resemblance Thesis is not deducible from necessary truths.
J	No contingents provable a priori	No contingent proposition is deducible from necessary truths.
K	Resemblance is not provable a posteriori	A Resemblance Thesis is not deducible from propositions about the observed.
L	Induction to Resemblance is circular if valid	A Resemblance Thesis is deducible from propositions about the observed only when to the latter is conjoined a Resemblance Thesis.
M	The validator of induction not necessary or observational	Any inductive argument is invalid, and the validator of it is neither a necessary truth nor a proposition about the observed.
M+	No validator of induction is necessary or observational	Any inductive argument is invalid, and any validator of it is neither a necessary truth nor a proposition about the observed.
N	Invalidity of induction incurable	Any inductive argument is invalid, and any validator of it is not a reason or part of a reason to believe its conclusion.
O	Deductivism	P is a reason to believe Q only if the argument from P to Q is valid, or there is a validator of it which is either a necessary truth or a proposition about the observed.

=== Further evidence for this identification ===
Having established that it is specifically deductivism that characterises his subjects, and leads them first to scepticism regarding induction and then to scepticism about any scientific theory, Stove now observes that deductivism is a thesis that of itself would incline a proponent towards language like that discussed in part one of Popper and After.

If you are a deductivist, then you cannot allow yourself to use, in earnest, the word "confirms", or any of the weak or non-deductive-logical expressions. To say of an observation-statement O that it confirms a scientific theory T, entails that those two propositions stand in some logical relation such that O is a reason to believe T. But this cannot be so if deductivism is true. ... In other words, he must often sabotage the logical expression "confirms".

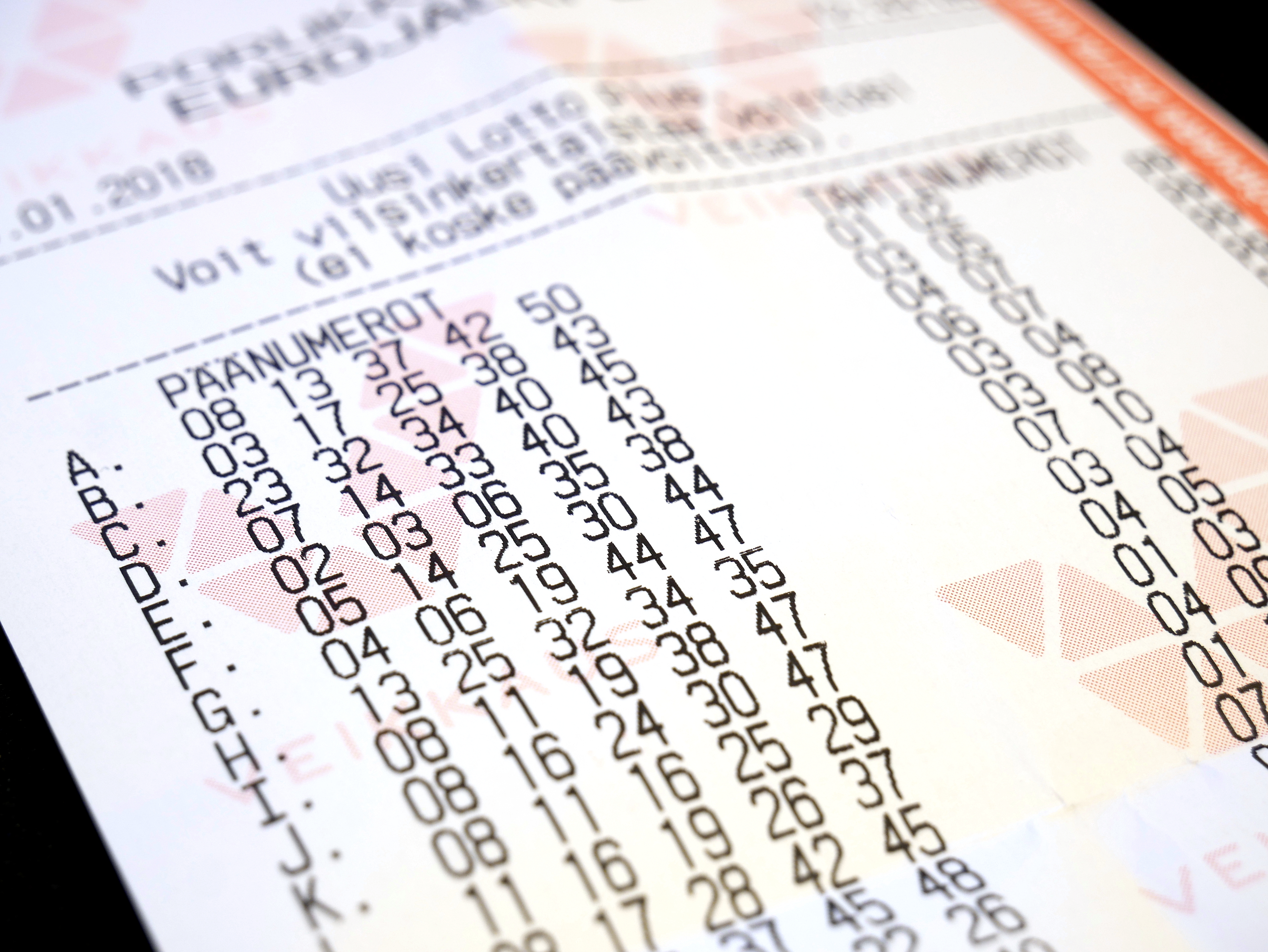
The probability of winning is not reduced by the mere fact that loss is possible.

Stove provides examples and further evidence before finally turning to a brief, common-sense defense of scientific reasoning.

Suppose I have come to know that P, "I hold just 999 of 1000 tickets in a fair lottery to be drawn tomorrow"; and suppose that, as a result of acquiring this knowledge, I have come to have a higher degree of belief than I had before in the proposition Q: "I will win the lottery tomorrow". Suppose that I am then reminded by someone of the fact that R, "It is logically possible that P be true and Q false"; and suppose I fully accept this truth, and add it to my stock of knowledge. I acknowledge, in other words, that although I hold nearly all tickets in this fair lottery, I might not win it. Suppose, finally, that on account of adding this truth R to my premise P, I come to have a lower degree of belief in Q than I had before being reminded of R. In that case, it will be evident, I am being irrational, ... because R is a necessary truth, and hence its conjunction with P is logically equivalent to P itself, while two arguments cannot differ in logical value if their premises are logically equivalent and they have the same conclusion [emphasis original].

Stove modifies this argument to suit induction and concludes the book with some strong words regarding the climate of discourse in the philosophy of science current at the time of publication.

== Reviews ==
With a combination of dazzling philosophical acumen and scarifying wit, Stove does for irrationalism in the philosophy of science what the Romans did for Carthage in the Third Punic War. He assaults and destroys it utterly.

— Roger Kimball,The New Criterion

- Agassi, Joseph (1985), "Review of Popper and After", Philosophy of the Social Sciences, 15 (3): 368–369, doi:10.1177/004839318501500312, S2CID 145544009
- Champion, Rafe, "Review of Anything Goes", the rathouse
- Moss, JMB (1984), "Review of Popper and After", The British Journal for the Philosophy of Science, 35 (3): 307–310, doi:10.1093/bjps/35.3.307, JSTOR 687483
- Lança, Patrícia (2001), "The Perils of Showmanship: David Stove, Karl Popper", The Salisbury Review, vol. 19, pp. 36–39

== See also ==
- Australian realism
- History and philosophy of science

== Bibliography ==
- David Charles Stove. Popper and After. Oxford: Pergamon Press, 1982.
- David Charles Stove. Probability and Hume's Inductive Scepticism. Oxford: Clarendon Press, 1973.
