= Stephen Mumford =

British philosopher (born 1965)

- Born: Stephen Dean Mumford; 31 July 1965 (age 61); Wakefield, West Riding of Yorkshire

Philosophical work
- Era: Contemporary philosophy
- Region: Western philosophy
- School: Analytic philosophy
- Main interests: Dispositions, laws, causation, metaphysics, truth, aesthetics
- Notable ideas: Dispositions

Stephen Dean Mumford (born 31 July 1965) is a British philosopher, who is currently Professor of Metaphysics in the Department of Philosophy at Durham University. Mumford is best known for his work in metaphysics on dispositions and laws, but has also made contributions in the philosophy of sport.

== Biography ==
Mumford was born in Wakefield, West Yorkshire. Mumford went on to read Philosophy and History of Ideas with Politics at Huddersfield Polytechnic (now University of Huddersfield) as his first degree. After Huddersfield, Mumford went on to the University of Leeds to take an MA in Philosophy of Mind. At Leeds, Mumford met Robin Le Poidevin who was to become his PhD supervisor. Mumford was awarded a PhD in 1994, for his thesis Dispositions and Reductionism, and was awarded a two-year lectureship at Leeds. Mumford left Leeds in 1995 for the University of Nottingham, where he worked until 2016. At Nottingham, Mumford served as Dean of the Faculty of Arts (2011–15), Head of the School of Humanities (2009–11), and Head of the Department of Philosophy (2004–7).

Mumford is the sole-author of four books: Dispositions (1998), Laws in Nature (2004), David Armstrong (2007), and Watching Sport: Aesthetics, Ethics and Emotions (2011). Mumford has also edited two books: Russell on Metaphysics (2003) and George Molnar's Powers: A Study in Metaphysics (2003). Most recently, Mumford co-authored, with Rani Lill Anjum, Getting Causes from Powers (2011).

== Dispositions and Dispositions (1998) ==
See main article: Dispositions

Commonplace dispositions are the elasticity of a rubber band, the fragility of a wineglass, and the solubility of sugar and salt. Such dispositions are to be found in abundance.

— Stephen Mumford, Dispositions (1998)

== Powers: A Study in Metaphysics (2003) ==
=== Background ===
See main article: George Molnar (philosopher)

The late philosopher George Molnar (1934–1999) published only four philosophical papers on metaphysics in his career, but his importance in the field should not be underestimated. After a return to the field, following a self-imposed absence, he was working on a book (Powers) and continued up until his sudden and untimely death in August 1999. The book remained unfinished until Mumford, who had previously been in contact with Molnar, in the summer of 1999, with the intention of giving feedback on the work (nearing completion), was approached to edit the remaining manuscript into a completed book. Mumford, along with several other figures in the field of metaphysics, including David Armstrong, were involved collaboratively in providing insight on Molnar's work, and on him as a person, but the editing was left to Mumford, as was the writing of an introductory chapter to correctly present and establish the material laid out - something which Molnar did not get round to doing before his death. Armstrong states, "We can be very grateful to Stephen Mumford for making a volume from the much that we have. His excellent introduction serves in place of the introductory chapter that was left unwritten". Mumford had discussed Molnar at a conference on Australian metaphysics, held in Grenoble (9–13 December 1999), but the colloquium - organised by Jean-Maurice Monnoyer, entitled "The Structure of the World: Objects, Properties and States of Affairs" - was to be the first official meeting of Mumford and Molnar as well. Mumford had considered this to be the end of the matter, but, in the spring of 2000, Mumford was contacted again concerning Powers. This time, however, it was through mutual friend Tony Skillen (lecturer in philosophy at the University of Kent) on behalf of Molnar's former partner Carlotta McIntosh, who had given access to the manuscript and who shared it with Mumford. Although the book was, in places, complete and filled with promise, there was much work to be done on the later chapters - Mumford reflects on a conversation between himself and Armstrong on the way to the Grenoble colloquium, mentioning Molnar's email stating the work was near finished, Armstrong replied: "it was near finished, in his mind". The main theory of powers survives, and with Mumford's help and editorial contribution is readily accessible.

== Metaphysics of science ==
Mumford was a project leader for The University of Nottingham in the AHRC (Arts & Humanities Research Council) funded three-year research project: the metaphysics of science. Mumford worked alongside Alexander Bird (Bristol) and Helen Beebee (Birmingham) within this project with their joint focus on "causes, laws, kinds, and dispositions". The project was described with the following abstract:

We naturally think that what happens in the universe is governed by laws of nature. We also think that events are causally related to other events, that things are naturally classified into kinds (physical, chemical and biological kinds, for example), and that at least some natural kinds have distinctive dispositions (for example, the disposition of NaCl to dissolve in water). This project explored how, or whether, all these distinct notions – law, cause, natural kind, disposition – can be made to fit together into a coherent and unified worldview. For example, must two causally related events be such that they are members of kinds that are lawfully related? Must those kinds be natural kinds? Are natural kinds distinguished from one another by the fact that members of different kinds are disposed to behave in different ways?

== Bibliography ==
=== Books ===
- Stephen Mumford; Rani Lill Anjum (2013). Causation: A Very Short Introduction. Oxford University Press.
- Stephen Mumford; Rani Lill Anjum (2011). Getting Causes From Powers. Oxford University Press.
- David Armstrong. Chesham: Acumen. 2007. ISBN 978-1-84465-100-9.
- Laws in Nature. Routledge. 2004. ISBN 0-415-31128-4.
- George Molnar (2003). Stephen Mumford (ed.). Powers: A Study in Metaphysics. Oxford University Press. ISBN 0-19-925978-X.
  - Edited with an introduction by Stephen Mumford; foreword by David Armstrong
- Bertrand Russell (2003). Stephen Mumford (ed.). Russell on Metaphysics. Routledge]. ISBN 0-415-27745-0.
  - Edited with Introductions by Stephen Mumford; Russell on... series edited by A. C. Grayling
- Stephen Mumford (1998). Dispositions. Clarendon Press. pp. xii + 249 pp. ISBN 0-19-823611-5.
- Stephen Dean Mumford (1994). Dispositions and Reductionism (PhD thesis). University of Leeds.
  - ...a critical examination of reductive accounts of the meaning and ontology of dispositional discourse
  - Available for consultation at the Brotherton Library, University of Leeds.
  - Constituent parts published separately include:
    - Dispositions, Supervenience and Reduction (1994).
    - Dispositions, Bases, Overdetermination and Identities (1995).

=== Selected articles ===
- "Passing Powers Around" (January 2009) — The Monist., vol. 92, no. 1
- "Negative Truth and Falsehood" (November 2006) — Proceedings of the Aristotelian Society (forthcoming in print, available online via Blackwell-Synergy)
- "The Ungrounded Argument" (April 2006) — Synthese., vol. 149, no. 3: 471-489
- "Function, Structure, Capacity" (March 2006) — Studies In History and Philosophy of Science Part A., vol. 37, iss. 1: 76-80
- "Kinds, Essences, Powers" (December 2005) — Ratio., vol. 18, iss. 4: 420-436
- "The True and the False" (June 2005) — Australasian Journal of Philosophy., vol. 83, no.2: 263-269
- "Laws and Lawlessness" (April 2005) — Synthese., vol. 144, no. 3: 397-413
- "Realism and the Conditional Analysis of Dispositions: Reply to Malzkorn" (July 2001) — The Philosophical Quarterly., vol. 51, no. 204: 375-378
  - Wolfgang Malzkorn: "Realism, Functionalism and the Conditional Analysis of Dispositions" (October 2000) — The Philosophical Quarterly., vol. 50, no. 201: 452-469
- "Miracles: Metaphysics and Modality" (June 2001) — Religious Studies., vol. 37, no.2: 191-202
  - Steve Clarke: "Response to Mumford and another definition of miracles" (December 2003) — Religious Studies., vol. 39, no. 4: 459-463
  - Morgan Luck: "In defence of Mumford's definition of a miracle" (December 2003) — Religious Studies., vol. 39, no. 4: 465-469
  - Steve Clarke: "Luck and miracles" (December 2003) — Religious Studies., vol. 39, no. 4: 471-474
- "Normative and Natural Laws" (April 2000) — Philosophy., vol. 75, no. 292: 265-282
- "Intentionality and the Physical: A New Theory of Disposition Ascription" (April 1999) — The Philosophical Quarterly., vol. 49, no. 125: 215-225
  - Ullin T. Place: "Intentionality and the Physical: A Reply to Mumford" (April 1999) — The Philosophical Quarterly., vol. 49, no. 125: 225-231
- "Laws of Nature Outlawed" (June 1998) — dialectica., vol. 52, no. 2: 83-101
- "Conditionals, Functional Essences and Martin on Dispositions" (January 1996) — The Philosophical Quarterly., vol. 46, no. 182: 86-92
- "Ellis and Lierse on Dispositional Essentialism" (December 1995) — Australasian Journal of Philosophy., vol. 73, no.4: 606-612
- "Dispositions, Bases, Overdetermination and Identities" (April 1995) — Ratio., vol. 8, iss. 1: 42-62
- "Dispositions, Supervenience and Reduction" (October 1994) — The Philosophical Quarterly., vol. 44, no. 177: 419-438
- "Dispositions" (Summer 1994) — Cogito., vol. 8: 141-146
- "A Puzzle About Causation" (Autumn 1993) — Philosophy Now., vol. 7: 23-30
