= Rogers Albritton =

American philosopher and academic

Rogers Garland Albritton (August 15, 1923 – May 21, 2002) was an American philosopher who served as chair of the Harvard and UCLA philosophy departments. He published little (only five research papers during his lifetime) and inspired the entry "albritton" (a contraction of "all but written") in the Philosophical Lexicon begun by Daniel Dennett (said entry having had its origins in a family joke). Albritton's specialties included ancient philosophy, philosophy of mind, free will, skepticism, metaphysics and the work of Ludwig Wittgenstein.

Highly respected in his field, Philosopher P. F. Strawson once described Rogers as "one of the 10 best philosophers in the world.” Hilary Putnam, a past president of the American Philosophical Association and emeritus professor at Harvard recounted: “Many would agree, including myself. He was quite unique."

Putnam goes on: “He gave me the feeling for what Socrates must have been like. Socrates didn’t publish much either. Like Socrates, he had a lot of impact on lots of philosophers.”

== Biography ==
Albritton was born in Columbus, Ohio to Errett Cyril Albritton, a research physiologist, and Rietta Garland Albritton, a chemist.

He was admitted to Swarthmore at the age of 15 but left to serve in the Army Air Corps in World War II. He received his B.A. from St. John's College, Annapolis in 1948. He taught for a year at St. John's and began teaching full-time at Cornell after completing 3 years of graduate work at Princeton University. He received his Ph.D. from Princeton in 1955 and continued to teach at Cornell before being appointed to Harvard in 1956.

He made tenure at Harvard in 1960 and served as chair from 1963 to 1970. In 1968, he was elected a Fellow of the American Academy of Arts and Sciences. In 1972, he transferred to University of California, Los Angeles, where he served as chair from 1972 to 1981. In 1984 he was president of the Western (then Pacific) Division of the American Philosophical Association.

He retired in 1991 but continued to teach courses at UCLA through the mid-1990s.

Having suffered from chronic emphysema, he died in 2002 of pneumonia.

Of his limited publication rate, his New York Times obituarist remarked:

"Dr. Albritton's penchant for always questioning a conclusion led him to avoid the permanency of the written word."

== Research ==
Albritton was not generally interested in mainstream philosophy such as ethics and other topics dealing with social and political philosophy. His main focus was to shift his attention to knowledge, thought processes, and validity within such methods of obtaining knowledge or if the knowledge itself was valid. This led his decision to focus on metaphysics and epistemology. This shaped his philosophies and studies further into his life.

=== Freedom of will vs. freedom of action ===
Albritton's 1985 presidential address to the APA, "Freedom of Will and Freedom of Action," distinguished freedom of action (the freedom to do what we will) from freedom of the will itself.

This was unusual, because free will had been identified with freedom of action by compatibilists since Thomas Hobbes and David Hume.

== Works ==
- “Forms of Particular Substances in Aristotle’s Metaphysics" Journal of Philosophy 54 (1957): 699–707.
- “Present Truth and Future Contingency” Philosophical Review 66 (1957): 29–46.
- “On Wittgenstein’s Use of the Term ‘Criterion’” Journal of Philosophy 56 (1959): 845–56.
- “Comments on Hilary Putnam’s ‘Robots: Machines or Artificially Created Life” Journal of Philosophy 61 (1964): 691–4.
- "Freedom of Will and Freedom of Action" Proceedings and Addresses of the American Philosophical Association. Vol. 59, No. 2 (Nov., 1985), pp. 239–251
- “Comments on ‘Moore’s Paradox and Self–Knowledge” Philosophical Studies 77 (1995): 229–39.
- "On a Form of Skeptical Argument from Possibility" Philosophical Issues 21 (2011): 1-24.
