= David Stove =

Australian philosopher (1927–1994)

- Born: David Charles Stove; 15 September 1927; Moree, New South Wales, Australia
- Died: 2 June 1994 (aged 66); Mulgoa, New South Wales, Australia

Education
- Education: University of Sydney
- Academic advisor: John Anderson

Philosophical work
- Era: 20th-century philosophy
- Region: Western philosophy
- School: Analytic philosophy Australian realism Conservatism
- Institutions: University of New South Wales, University of Sydney
- Main interests: Philosophy of science, metaphysics
- Notable ideas: Subjective idealism resting on the worst argument

David Charles Stove (15 September 1927 – 2 June 1994) was an Australian philosopher whose writings often challenged prevailing academic orthodoxy. He was known for his critiques of postmodernism, feminism, and multiculturalism.

== Philosophy ==
His work in philosophy of science included criticisms of David Hume's inductive scepticism. He offered a positive response to the problem of induction in his 1986 work, The Rationality of Induction. In Popper and After: Four Modern Irrationalists, Stove attacked the leading philosophers of science, Karl Popper, Thomas Kuhn, Imre Lakatos, and Paul Feyerabend, on the grounds that their commitment to the thesis that all logic is deductive led to skepticism.

In 1985 Stove held a competition to find the "worst argument in the world", and awarded the prize to himself for the argument "we can know things only under our forms of understanding/as they are related to us, etc, therefore we cannot know things as they are in themselves". He called this argument "The Gem" and argued that it appeared widely in various forms.

His book The Plato Cult and Other Philosophical Follies contains the influential essay "What Is Wrong With Our Thoughts?". According to philosopher Nicholas Shackel, this essay showed that "there are indefinitely many ways of cheating intellectually and for most there is no simple way to put one’s finger on how the cheat is effected." In the book, he also coined the phrase Horror Victorianorum (terror of the Victorian), an extreme distaste or condemnation of Victorian culture, art and design.

Stove was also a critic of sociobiology, describing it as a new religion in which genes play the role of gods.

== Politics ==
Stove and David M. Armstrong both resisted what they saw as attempts by Marxists to infiltrate the Faculty of Arts at the University of Sydney. In 1984–85 Stove protested publicly that the faculty was favouring women in appointments.

In "A Farewell to Arts", Stove wrote that he abandoned Marxism when he discovered "what real intellectual work was".

In his essay "Why You Should be A Conservative", Stove argued that actions can have unforeseen and unwelcome consequences; that just because something is wrong or evil, it does not follow that the world would be better off without it; and that a decline in respect for life and property had led to a decline in quality of life.

In "Racial and Other Antagonisms" (1989) Stove asserted that racism is not a form of prejudice but common sense: "Almost everyone unites in declaring 'racism' false and detestable. Yet absolutely everyone knows it is true".

In "The Intellectual Capacity of Women" (1990) he stated his belief that "the intellectual capacity of women is on the whole inferior to that of men".

== Legacy ==
Since his death in 1994 four collections of his writings have been published. Two were edited by art critic Roger Kimball: Against the Idols of the Age and Darwinian Fairytales. Kimball also wrote the foreword to What's Wrong With Benevolence, in which he writes "The most thrilling intellectual discovery of my adult life came in 1996 when I chanced upon the work of the Australian philosopher David Stove".

== Personal life ==
With his wife Jessie, he had two children, Judith and R. J. Stove.

Stove enjoyed cricket, baroque music and gardening.

Stove committed suicide after being diagnosed with esophageal cancer.

== Works ==
- Probability and Hume's Inductive Scepticism. Oxford: Clarendon, 1973.
- Popper and After: Four Modern Irrationalists, Oxford: Pergamon Press, 1982 (Reprinted as Anything Goes: Origins of the Cult of Scientific Irrationalism, Macleay Press, Sydney, 1998; and as Scientific Irrationalism, New Brunswick: Transaction, 2001.)
- The Rationality of Induction . Oxford: Clarendon, 1986.
- The Plato Cult and Other Philosophical Follies. Oxford: Blackwell, 1991.
- Cricket versus Republicanism, (ed.) James Franklin & R. J. Stove. Sydney: Quakers Hill Press, 1995.
- Darwinian Fairytales. Aldershot: Avebury Press, 1995 (Repr. New York: Encounter Books, 2006).
- Against the Idols of the Age, ed. Roger Kimball. New Brunswick and London: Transaction, 1999.
- On Enlightenment, (ed.) Andrew Irvine. New Brunswick and London: Transaction, 2002.
- What's Wrong with Benevolence: Happiness, Private Property, and the Limits of Enlightenment, (ed.) Andrew Irvine. New York: Encounter Books, 2011.

Collaborations

- "Hume, Probability, and induction". In: V.C. Chappell (ed.), Hume: A Collection of Critical Essays. Garden City, N.Y.: Doubleday & Company, Inc., 1966, pp. 187–212.
- "Dr. Johnson, British Moralist." In: Peter Coleman, L. Shrubb & V. Smith (ed.), Quadrant: Twenty Five Years. St. Lucia: University of Queensland Press, 1982, pp. 308–7.
- "Why Should Probability be the Guide of Life?" In: D.W. Livingston & D.T. King (ed.), Hume: A Re-Evaluation. New York: Fordham University Press, 1976, pp. 50–68.
- "Hume’s Argument about the Unobserved". In: J. Hardy & J. Eade (ed.), Studies in the Eighteenth Century. Oxford: The Voltaire Foundation/Taylor Institution, 1983, pp. 189–206.
- "The Nature of Hume's Skepticism." In: Stanley Tweyman, (ed.), David Hume: Critical Assessments. London: Routledge, 1995, Vol. II, pp. 274–94.

Selected publications

- "On Logical Definitions of Confirmation", British Journal for the Philosophy of Science 16, 1966, pp. 265–272.
- "Deductivism" (PDF). Australasian Journal of Philosophy. 51: 76–98. 1970.
- "Laws and Singular Propositions", Australasian Journal of Philosophy 51, 1973, pp. 139–143.
- "How Popper's Philosophy Began" (PDF). Philosophy. 57: 381–387. 1982.
- "The Subjection of John Stuart Mill" (PDF). Philosophy. 68: 5–13. 1993. doi:10.1017/s0031819100040006.
