= Kenneth Minogue =

Australian political theorist (1930–2013)

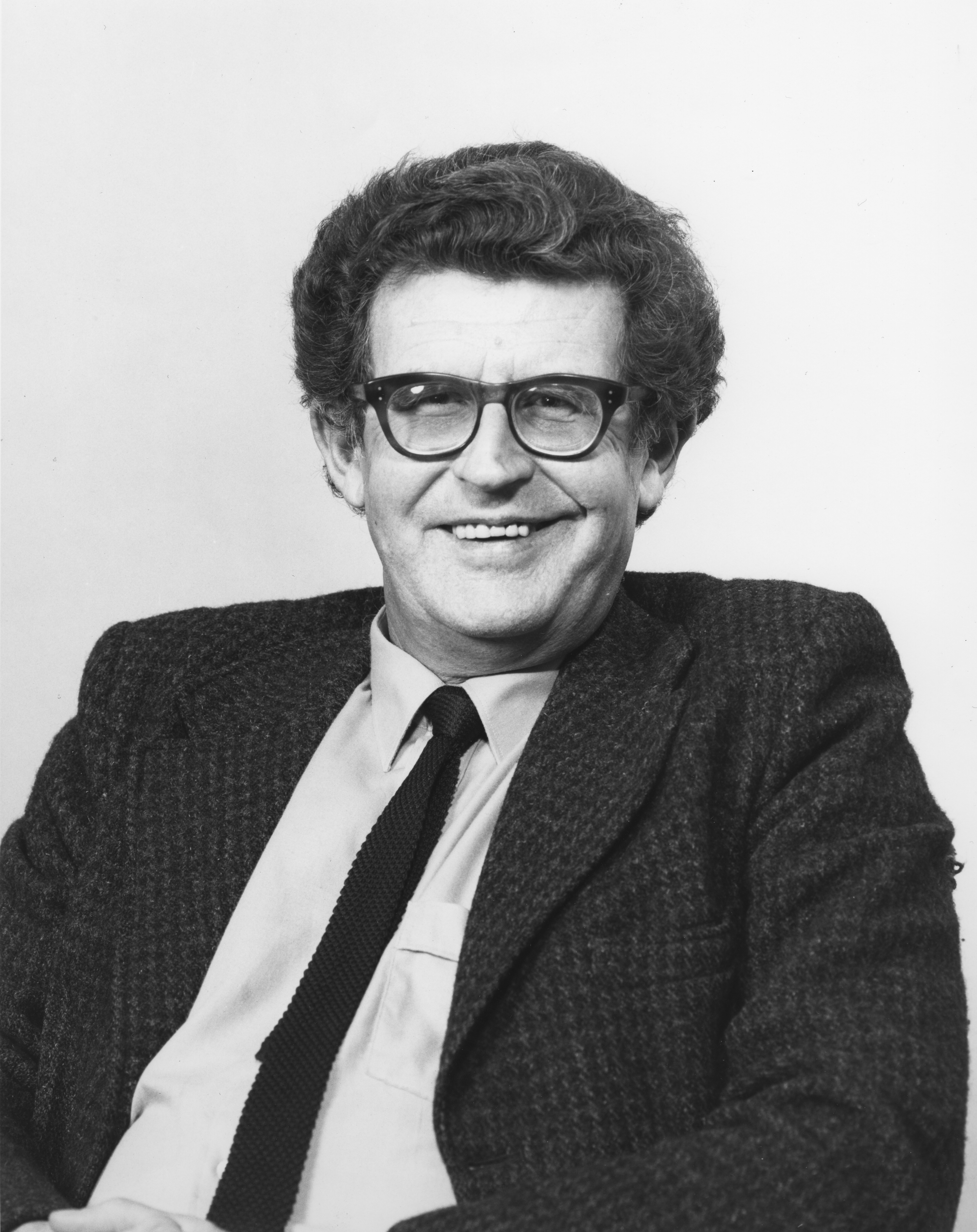
- Minogue, c. 1980s
- Born: Kenneth Robert Minogue; 11 September 1930; Palmerston North, New Zealand
- Died: 28 June 2013 (aged 82); Guayaquil, Ecuador
- Other name: Ken Minogue
- Spouses: Valerie Pearson Hallett (m. 1954; div. 2001); Beverly Cohen (died c. 2010)

Academic background
- Education: University of Sydney; London School of Economics
- Influences: John Anderson

Academic work
- Discipline: Political science
- Sub-discipline: Political theory
- School or tradition: Conservatism
- Institutions: London School of Economics

Kenneth Robert Minogue (September 11, 1930 – June 28, 2013) was an Australian academic and political theorist. Long residing in the United Kingdom, Minogue was a prominent part of the intellectual life of British conservatism.

Associated for much of his career with the London School of Economics, where he was Professor of Political Science from 1984 to 1995, he was described as a central figure in a group of prominent conservative philosophers and commentators at the LSE that included Maurice Cranston, Elie Kedourie, and William Letwin.

== Biography ==
Minogue was born on 11 September 1930 in Palmerston North, New Zealand. He was educated in Australia, attending Sydney Boys High School and the University of Sydney. Graduating with a Bachelor of Arts degree in 1950, his time there was influenced by John Anderson, who had built up a reputation on campus for his firm belief in free speech, secularism, and anti-communism. Minogue was involved in student journalism – which he admitted was to the detriment of his studies – and wrote for Honi Soit and a short-lived free-thinking broadsheet, Heresy. Friends included Murray Sayle and Peter Coleman.

Deciding to move to England, Minogue made his way there by working as a cabin boy on a ship bound for London via Odessa and Port Said, and, once arrived, soon found himself lodging at a hostel in Russell Square. After a brief stint as a freelance writer, he found steadier income by working as a supply teacher with the London Education Authority for eighteen months. Turned down for a master's degree at the LSE, he instead enrolled for a second undergraduate evening school course in economics at the same institution. Following graduation he spent a year teaching at the University of Exeter, and in 1956 at the invitation of Michael Oakeshott returned as assistant lecturer to the LSE, where he would spend the rest of his academic life.

== Career ==
Minogue wrote academic essays and books on a great range of problems in political theory. He first came to public attention with his 1963 book The Liberal Mind, which criticised the 'drift' toward collectivism and progressivism in Britain's post-war consensus, which he believed acted as a 'prop to the mediocre' and deprived individuals of personal initiative. A running theme in the book was Minogue's distaste for the 'melodrama of oppressors and victims' that he saw as constituting liberal historiography. Minogue, who described liberalism as the first 'modern ideology', also reflected on what he argued was the second – nationalism – in his 1967 book of the same name. As far as Minogue was concerned, if the liberal view of history tended to the ahistorical, then nationalist ideology was guilty of reducing it to mythology.

In 1986 Minogue presented a six-part television program on Channel 4 about free-market economics called The New Enlightenment. He was Senior Research Fellow with the Social Affairs Unit in London. He wrote a study on Māori–Pākehā relations (the latter is the Māori term for New Zealanders of European descent) for the New Zealand Business Roundtable which was published in 1998 as Waitangi - Morality and Reality.

From 1991 to 1993 Minogue was chairman of the euro-sceptic Bruges Group. From 2000, he was a trustee of Civitas. He served as president of the Mont Pelerin Society from 2010. In 2003, he received the Centenary Medal from the Australian government. He was also involved with the Centre for Policy Studies and the European Foundation.

== Personal ==
He married firstly, Valerie Pearson Hallett, with whom he had a son and a daughter, in 1954. This marriage was dissolved in 2001. Minogue was later married to Beverly Cohen, who predeceased him. He was reportedly a member of the Garrick Club and a keen tennis fan.

=== Death ===
Minogue died on 28 June 2013, aged 82, in Guayaquil, Ecuador, after apparently suffering cardiac arrest on a flight returning from San Cristóbal Island in the Galapagos, where he had been hosting a meeting of the Mont Pelerin Society.

On Minogue's legacy, James Philbin in The American Spectator suggested that Minogue was "no mere academic" but "a model of the conservative activist" because "he was in the business of defending old-fashioned civility against ideological rage, and he believed this was the real meaning of the freedom that the English-speaking peoples have created and enjoyed."

== Bibliography ==
- The Liberal Mind (1963)
- Nationalism (1967)
- The Concept of a University (1974)
- Contemporary Political Philosophers (1976)
- Alien Powers: The Pure Theory of Ideology (1985)
- Thatcherism: Personality and Politics (ed, 1987)
- Politics: A Very Short Introduction (1995)
- Conservative Realism: New Essays in Conservatism (ed, 1996)
- The Silencing of Society (1997)
- Waitangi: Morality and Reality (1998)
- The Servile Mind: How Democracy Erodes the Moral Life (2010)

Non-profit organization positions
Preceded by Deepak Lal	President of the Mont Pelerin Society; 2008–2010	Succeeded by Allan H. Meltzer
