= J. J. C. Smart =

Australian philosopher and academic

J. J. C. Smart AC FAHA
- Born: John Jamieson Carswell Smart; 16 September 1920; Cambridge, England
- Died: 6 October 2012 (aged 92); Melbourne, Australia
- Other name: Jack Smart

Education
- Education: University of Glasgow; Queen's College, Oxford
- Academic advisor: Gilbert Ryle

Philosophical work
- Era: 20th-century philosophy
- Region: Western philosophy
- School: Analytic philosophy; Australian realism
- Institutions: University of Adelaide; La Trobe University; Australian National University
- Doctoral students: Mark Colyvan; Phillip H. Wiebe
- Notable students: Jeff Malpas; Henry Krips
- Main interests: Philosophy of mind; metaphysics; philosophy of science; philosophy of time; political philosophy; philosophy of religion
- Notable ideas: Mind–brain identity theory; rate of passage argument; nomological danglers

John Jamieson Carswell Smart (16 September 1920 – 6 October 2012) was a British-Australian philosopher who was appointed as an Emeritus Professor by the Australian National University. He worked in the fields of metaphysics, philosophy of science, philosophy of mind, philosophy of religion, and political philosophy. He wrote several entries for the Stanford Encyclopedia of Philosophy.

== Career ==
Born in Cambridge, England, of Scottish parents, Smart began his education locally, attending The Leys School, a leading independent boarding school. His younger brothers also became professors: Alastair (1922–1992) was Professor of Art History at Nottingham University; Ninian was a professor of religious studies and a pioneer in that field. Their father, William Marshall Smart, was John Couch Adams Astronomer at Cambridge University and later Regius Professor of Astronomy at Glasgow. In 1950, W. M. Smart was President of the Royal Astronomical Society. In 1946, Jack Smart graduated from the University of Glasgow with an MA, followed by a BPhil from Oxford University in 1948. He then worked as a Junior Research Fellow at Corpus Christi College, Oxford, for two years.

Smart served in the Second World War with the British Army where he was commissioned as a second lieutenant in the Royal Corps of Signals on 9 October 1941 and given the service number 212091. His war service was mainly in India and Burma. He was demobilised in April 1946 and in 1950 was granted the honorary rank of lieutenant.

He arrived in Australia in August 1950 to take up the Chair of Philosophy at the University of Adelaide, which he occupied from 1950 until 1972. After twenty-two years in Adelaide, he moved to La Trobe University where he was Reader in Philosophy from 1972 to 1976. He then moved to the Australian National University where he was Professor of Philosophy in the Research School of Social Sciences from 1976 until his retirement in 1985, and where the annual Jack Smart Lecture is held in his honour. Following his retirement he was Emeritus Professor at Monash University.

Smart was a Foundation Fellow of the Australian Academy of the Humanities at its establishment in 1969. In 1990 he was awarded the Companion in the General Division of the Order of Australia. In 1991 he was elected to become an honorary Fellow of Corpus Christi College, Oxford, and in 2010, elected to become an honorary Fellow of Queen's College, Oxford.

At first Smart was a behaviourist before becoming an early proponent of type identity theory.

== Metaphysics ==
Smart's main contribution to metaphysics is in the area of philosophy of time. He has been an influential defender of the B-theory of time, and of perdurantism.

His most important original arguments in this area concern the passage of time, which he claimed is an illusion. He argued that if time really passed, then it would make sense to ask at what rate it passes, but this requires some second time-dimension with respect to which passage of normal time can be measured. This in turn faces the same problems, and so there must be a third time-dimension, and so on. This is called the rate of passage argument and it was originally put forward by C. D. Broad.

Smart changed his mind about the nature and causes of the illusion of the passage of time. In the 1950s, he held that it was due to people's use of anthropocentric temporal language. He later came to abandon this linguistic explanation of the illusion in favour of a psychological explanation in terms of the passage of memories from short-term to long-term memory.

== Philosophy of mind ==
Regarding the philosophy of mind, Smart was a physicalist. In the 1950s, he was also one of the originators, with Ullin Place, of the mind–brain identity theory, which claims that particular states of mind are identical with particular states of the brain. Initially, this view was dubbed "Australian materialism" by its detractors, in reference to the stereotype of Australians as "down-to-earth" and "unsophisticated".

Smart's identity theory dealt with some extremely long-standing objections to physicalism by comparing the mind–brain identity thesis to other identity theses well known from science, such as the thesis that lightning is an electrical discharge, or that the morning star is the evening star. Although these identity theses give rise to puzzles such as Gottlob Frege's puzzle of the Morning Star and Evening Star, in the scientific cases, some claim that it would be absurd to reject the identity theses on this ground. Since the puzzles facing physicalism are strictly analogous to the scientific identity theses, it would then also be absurd to reject physicalism on the grounds that it gives rise to these puzzles.

== Ethics ==
In ethics, Smart was a defender of utilitarianism. Specifically, he defended "extreme", or act utilitarianism, as opposed to "restricted", or rule utilitarianism. The distinction between these two types of ethical theory is explained in his essay Extreme and Restricted Utilitarianism.

Smart gave two arguments against rule utilitarianism. According to the first, rule utilitarianism collapses into act utilitarianism because there is no adequate criterion on what can count as a "rule". According to the second, even if there were such a criterion, the rule utilitarian would be committed to the untenable position of preferring to follow a rule, even if it would be better if the rule were broken, which Smart called "superstitious rule worship".

Another aspect of Smart's ethical theory is his acceptance of a preference theory of well-being, which contrasts with the hedonism associated with "classical" utilitarians such as Jeremy Bentham. Smart's combination of the preference theory with consequentialism is sometimes called "preference utilitarianism".

Smart's arguments against rule utilitarianism have been very influential, contributing to a steady decline in its popularity among ethicists during the late 20th century. Worldwide, his defence of act utilitarianism and preference theory has been less prominent but has influenced philosophers who have worked or been educated in Australia, such as Frank Jackson, Philip Pettit, and Peter Singer.

One of Smart's two entries in The Philosophical Lexicon refers to his approach to the consequences of act utilitarianism: to "outsmart" an opponent is "to embrace the conclusion of one's opponent's reductio ad absurdum argument." This move is more commonly called "biting the bullet".

== Works ==
"Extreme and Restricted Utilitarianism", The Philosophical Quarterly, Oct. 1956, pages 344–354.
An Outline of a System of Utilitarian Ethics, 1961.
Philosophy and Scientific Realism, 1963.
Problems of Space and Time, 1964 (edited, with introduction).
Between Science and Philosophy: An Introduction to the Philosophy of Science, 1968.
Utilitarianism : For and Against (co-authored with Bernard Williams; 1973)
Ethics, Persuasion and Truth, 1984.
Essays Metaphysical and Moral,1987.
Our Place in the Universe: A Metaphysical Discussion, 1989.
Atheism and Theism (Great Debates in Philosophy) (including contributions by John Haldane; 1996)
