= Horror Victorianorum =

Horror Victorianorum (terror of the Victorian), coined by the philosopher David Stove, is an extreme distaste or condemnation of Victorian culture, art and design. The term was used in Stove's book The Plato Cult as part of his argument against Karl Popper and other philosophers whom he characterised as "modernists". For Stove, Popper was influenced by the pervasive anti-Victorian mentality of the era, epitomised by Evelyn Waugh's book A Handful of Dust, in which the absurdity of Victorian values is expressed by a parody of "Victorian" conceptions of the civilizing mission of imperialism, when the hero is finally trapped in the Amazonian jungle, forced eternally to read the works of Dickens to a tribal chief.

For Stove, the ascription of absurdity to Victorian culture was essentially a matter of taste, but one so powerful and irrational that it possessed the intensity of religious faith. As a result, it produced a revulsion – rather than reasoned scepticism – to writers such as the Victorian philosopher of science William Whewell.

Following Stove's usage, the term was taken up by the design historian Shelagh Wilson to refer to modernist distaste for Victorian architecture and design. Wilson argued that "Palissyite" design, influenced by the methods of Bernard Palissy, had been ridiculed and misunderstood by proponents of "Puginite" design, following the proto-modernist principles of Augustus Pugin. Wilson's argument formed part of a reaffirmation of the aesthetic principles of the grotesque.

The argument that distaste for Victorian cultural values ('Anti-victorianism') is irrational has been adopted by other writers,either following Stove's politically conservative attack on liberal thought, or Wilson's critique of modernism.

== Notes ==
1. Kimball, Roger (1997). "Art Without Beauty". The Public Interest (127). Archived from the original on 24 November 2005 – via FindArticles.

== Literature ==
- Stove, D., The Plato Cult and other Philosophical follies, Blackwell, 1991
- Wilson, S., "Monsters and monstrosities: grotesque taste and Victorian design", in Trodd, Colin, et al. (eds.), Victorian Culture and the Idea of the Grotesque, Ashgate, 1999

== See also ==
Victorian Era
