= Disposition =

Tendency of a person to act in a specified way

A disposition is a quality of character, a habit, a preparation, a state of readiness, or a tendency to act in a specified way.

The terms dispositional belief and occurrent belief refer, in the former case, to a belief that is held in the mind but not currently being considered, and in the latter case, to a belief that is currently being considered by the mind.

In Bourdieu's theory of fields, dispositions are the natural tendencies of each individual to take on a specific position in any field. There is no strict determinism through one's dispositions. The habitus is the choice of positions according to one's dispositions. However, in retrospect, a space of possibilities can always be observed.

A disposition is not a process or event in some duration in time, but rather the state, preparation, or tendency of a structure "in waiting". In the field of possibilities, its actual triggering has a statistical value.

== Metaphysics ==
The debate about dispositions in metaphysics attempts to understand the fundamental nature of properties, including how they relate to laws of nature. The initial question asks if dispositions are real.

Metaphysical dispositionalism (a form of realism about dispositions) argues that dispositions are causally efficacious properties inherent to objects that are sufficient to produce change. Consider fragility. If a glass is suitably struck, it will break. Fragility is a property of the glass that accounts for this breaking. Paradigmatic examples of dispositional properties include fragility, solubility, and flammability. Dispositionalism maintains that even paradigmatically qualitative properties, such as squareness, possess causal powers—for example, when combined with hardness, the power to produce a square impression in soft wax. This view is historically argued for by Aristotle and Leibniz. Contemporary proponents include Sydney Shoemaker, U.T. Place, Stephen Mumford, Alexander Bird, George Molnar, and Brian David Ellis.

Others answer that dispositions are not real properties. Anti-realism about disposition argues that dispositions are ontologically derivative of the interaction of categorical (or qualitative) properties and laws. Accordingly, calling a glass fragile is a useful shorthand for describing the potential interactions of its microstructure (a categorical property) and the laws of nature; dispositions are not additional elements of being. Since the microstructure and laws are enough to explain fragility, there is no causal role for a dispositional property, here fragility, to play. This view is historically argued for by Descartes, Boyle, Hume and the logical positivists. Contemporary proponents, including David Lewis, David Malet Armstrong, and Jonathan Schaffer, continue in a neo-Human, empiricist tradition that argues for categorical on the assumption that there are no necessary connections between distinct existences.

Middle ground views are possible. The most notable is the limit (or identity) view defended by Charles B. Martin and John Heil. According to this view, dispositional and categorical (or, as Martin prefers, "qualitative", because categorical seems to be misleading) predicates are different ways of identifying one and the same property. Additionally, the properties lie on a spectrum in which it could approach either limit; however, it can never reach either end because those concepts are unrealizable. Ontologically, however, there is no real difference between the two. Fragility, for example, is both a real disposition of glass to break upon being struck and an abstraction from the underlying molecular structure. Squareness, to take another example, is both a quality of having four sides of equal length that meet at equal angles and an abstraction from the fact that this property interacts with its environment to leave square impressions on soft wax (when combined with the property ‘hardness’).

== Law ==
In law, a disposition is a civil or criminal hearing where a case can be resolved.

== Education ==
In education, a 2023 study has shown a strong correlation between the way the instructor designed assignments and students' responses to how they navigated tasks (Hardy, Kordonowy & Liss, 2023). When assignments emphasized autonomy and reflection, students were more inclined to adopt problem-exploring dispositions. However, when instructors specified strict rules for tackling problems, students were more likely to lean toward finding quick, correct answers without exploring other angles.

== Religion ==
In Christian thought, "disposition" has two meanings. Firstly, it may refer to a deliberately practiced habit of behaving in a certain way, for example, "a virtue is an habitual and firm disposition to do the good." Secondly, it may refer to a state of a person that is required for reception of a sacrament, for example, a disposition of genuine repentance is required for the forgiveness of sins in confession.

== See also ==
- Ability
- Adaptive expertise
- Counterfactualism
- Dispositional attribution
- Habitus (sociology)
- Nature versus nurture
- Truth
