= Adaptive expertise =

Adaptive expertise is a broad construct that encompasses a range of cognitive, motivational, and personality-related components, as well as habits of mind and dispositions. Generally, problem-solvers demonstrate adaptive expertise when they are able to efficiently solve previously encountered tasks and generate new procedures for new tasks. This definition can be contrasted with more traditional ideas of expertise popularized by Chi and others, which do not typically consider adaptation to completely novel situations. Its empirical validity has been examined in a number of training and learning contexts. The term was first coined by Giyoo Hatano and Kayoko Inagaki, to tease out the variability within groups of experts. Hatano and Inagaki, described two types of expertise: routine expertise, or classic expertise, and adaptive expertise. They defined routine expertise as involving mastering procedures in such a way as to become highly efficient and accurate, whereas developing adaptive expertise requires an individual to develop conceptual understanding that allows the "expert" to invent new solutions to problems and even new procedures for solving problems. To illustrate, imagine two sushi chefs: one who makes every piece perfectly but routinely makes the same few types over and over (routine, or classic, expertise), and one produces new menus frequently (adaptive expertise). To some, this is an unfair comparison, as ones' environment supports behavior. For example, the routine of the classic expert sushi chef may be tied to his restaurant environment, and this chef may be able to break out of the routines easily given a different situation. However, the adaptive expert chef clearly demonstrates flexible knowledge and performance of sushi-making. Learning Scientists are interested in adaptive expertise, in part because they would like to understand the types of learning trajectories that may allow practitioners break free from routines when necessary.

There is not, however, a true dichotomy between adaptive and classic expertise. Expertise can be thought of as a continuum of adaptive ability. On one end, practitioners can be classified as "routinely skilled" versus "innovatively competent"; as "artisans" versus "virtuosos"; or as those approaching a task in a routine versus more flexible way. The notion of adaptive expertise suggests that new problems can be viewed as a platform for exploration in a new problem space and not just an opportunity to practice completing a task more efficiently. For example, adaptability enabled the Apollo 13 crew to successfully build an air filter from ill-fitting parts whilst in space, while the TV chef, Jamie Oliver, is able to flamboyantly and creatively produce good food using only simple ingredients.

A distinguishing feature of adaptive expertise is the ability to apply knowledge effectively to novel problems or atypical cases in a domain. Holyoak characterized adaptive experts as being capable of drawing on their knowledge to invent new procedures for solving unique or fresh problems, rather than simply applying already mastered procedures. Adaptability allows experts to recognize when highly practiced rules and principles do not apply in certain situations in which other solvers might typically attempt to use a previously learned procedure. Moreover, studies have shown that this flexibility can result in better performance than that of classically defined experts, resulting in, amongst other things, better technical trouble shooting; workplace error avoidance; and more accurate medical diagnosis. John D. Bransford considers this flexible, innovative application of knowledge, in large part, underlies adaptive experts' greater tendency to enrich and refine their understanding on the basis of continuing experience to learn from problem-solving episodes.

== A model of adaptive expertise ==
One model of adaptive expertise looks at two dimensions along which a learner may develop: efficiency and innovation. Classic experts are defined as being efficient when solving problems that are routine. When presented with a problem that is not routine, or when transferring into a different situation, the adaptive expert may innovate.

Schwartz, Bransford and Sears have graphically illustrated these two dimensions of expertise. On the horizontal axis, they plot efficiency of problem solving, and on the vertical axis they plot ability to innovate. In this graph, they identify four important regions: Novice (low efficiency, low innovation), Routine Expert (high efficiency, low innovation), Frustrated or Annoying Novice (low efficiency and high innovation), and Adaptive Expert (high efficiency and high innovation). As originally presented, this graph is intended as a starting point for understanding how educators should guide students' learning and trajectory to adaptive expertise. Schwartz and colleagues suggest that the trajectory, and therefore instruction, should aim for a balance of innovation and efficiency. This work is highly related to their theories of Transfer of Learning and research on instruction that supports transfer and trajectories to adaptive expertise.

== Trajectories to adaptive expertise ==
Schwartz and his colleagues suggest two possible trajectories to adaptive expertise 1) innovate and then become efficient or 2) become efficient and then practice innovating. In several studies of instructional interventions, they have demonstrated that trajectory 1, innovation to efficiency, is the better developmental path. Based on this finding, these researchers have suggested that before learning procedures for solving problems, students should first be given the opportunity to innovate and attempt to discover solutions to novel problems without instruction. Following this practice with innovation, students can then benefit from routine practice, with less risk of becoming a routine expert or simply a frustrated novice.

== Developing adaptive expertise in the classroom ==
Giyoo Hatano and Kayoko Inagaki, proposed three factors that impact the development of adaptive expertise. First, the degree to which an individual's environment contains "randomness" requires one to modify skills based on careful observation of interacting factors. The second factor concerns the degree to which an individual is rewarded for performing skills. They theorized that environments with fewer rewards encourage individuals to experiment, rather than attempting to master rules by which they might gain rewards. The third factor is the degree to which the individual's cultural context values and promotes understanding of skills over efficiency. These factors, the authors believe, serve to promote not just procedural understanding but conceptual understanding of skills.

Hatano and Oura wrote that, based on current understandings of developing expertise, school learning is deficient in allowing for distributed expertise across groups and in promoting the sociocultural significance of content. They added that based on recent research, adaptive expertise may be promoted in schools by couching learning in contexts that view the learning as socially significant, such as performing for audiences or solving real-world problems. True adaptive expertise may not be a realistic goal for school learning, but the teaching for adaptive expertise may set students on a trajectory for later competence.

Some research has been conducted to determine when and how adaptive expertise should be developed within the elementary classroom setting. Much of the research focuses on areas of mathematics. In order to begin to cultivate adaptive expertise, Mercier and Higgins found that students must be allowed to be innovative and exploratory with mathematical concepts. Within the context of mathematics, students should be given multiple strategies for solving a set of problems, rather than presenting one strategy for a given set. By allowing the students to explore and reflect upon the different possible math strategies, each student will choose a method that is “personal and insightful” and will help move them towards becoming more flexible and adaptive. Other research found that the use of manipulatives helped to develop understanding and students were able to transfer their knowledge to new situations.

Researchers have also determined that adaptive expertise can be supported by creating an environment that encourages motivation to interact with the material. Students will be motivated to succeed as they work through their misconceptions and try to obtain understanding. This environment should also be safe for students to explore while not feeling the pressure to perform at perfection.

Collaboration has also been suggested to help develop adaptive expertise. As students work together in a group setting, each member discusses their individual thoughts about the concepts. As group members listen to each other's thought and ideas, individuals are forced to reflect upon their thoughts and reconsider their viewpoints. In doing so, the students are considering the concepts at a deeper level.

Verschaffel et al. explain that “adaptive expertise is not something that can be trained or taught but rather something that has to be promoted or cultivated.” They further these thoughts by suggesting that future research should be conducted over a long period of time in order to analyze the results of developing adaptive expertise.

== See also ==
- Expertise
- Expert systems
- Skilled worker
- Transfer of Learning
- Habits of Mind
