= The Nature of Mind =

Essay by David Armstrong

"The Nature of Mind" is a philosophical essay by David Armstrong, originally published in The Nature of Mind and Other Essays in 1980. In this essay, Armstrong outlines a philosophical account of the mind that is compatible with the Materialist scientific view of the mind. He arrives at a theory of central-state materialism, a synthesis between René Descartes' dualism (the thesis) and Gilbert Ryle's dispositional behaviourism (the antithesis).

== Structure and arguments ==
The essay begins with the simple assertion that "men have minds", and Armstrong suggests that modern science may be the best tool with which to investigate the nature of the mind. He says that it seems that scientific consensus is converging on an explanation of the mind in "purely physico-chemical terms". He acknowledges some disagreement on the matter, but says that dissent tends to be on primarily non-scientific grounds. Armstrong writes that the purpose of his essay is to outline a Materialist account of the nature of the mind - one that is compatible with the scientific view of an entirely physico-chemical mind.

=== The authority of science ===
Armstrong states that science can achieve consensus among experts on controversial matters after prolonged investigation. This, he says, makes science the authority on the nature of the mind and other matters. It is recognized that science can make mistakes, and that some claim that science has a limited sphere of inquiry. He puts forward science as the best hope we have in understanding the mind.

=== Defining the mental ===
Returning to the search for a Materialist account of the mind, Armstrong considers behaviourism, which holds that the mind "is not something behind the behaviour of the body, it [is] simply part of that physical behaviour". While behaviourism fits nicely with a Materialist view of the mind, it has significant flaws - it is possible to feel or think something without acting on this feeling or thought. For instance, one can feel angry but not express anger.

Armstrong looks at Gilbert Ryle's refinement of behaviourism, dispositional behaviourism. Armstrong illustrates Ryle's idea with a description of glass - brittleness is the disposition of materials such as glass to shatter under certain circumstances. Whether or not the glass shatters in a particular instance, it has the disposition to do so. In the same way, a mind can have a disposition towards anger, but it may only express this anger under certain circumstances. Armstrong quotes Ryle's The Concept of Mind:

"To possess a dispositional property is not to be in a particular state, or to undergo a particular change; it is to be bound or liable to be in a particular state, or to undergo a particular change, when a particular change is realized."

— Gilbert Ryle, The Concept of Mind, 1949

While this dispositional behaviourism quite successfully deals with the objection that one can feel or think one thing and do another, it is not enough - "it seems obvious as anything is obvious that there is something actually going on in me that constitutes my thought". Ryle's dispositional behaviourism denies this, and so Armstrong declares it to be "unsatisfactory as a theory of mind". Though he rejects behaviourism, Armstrong suggests that it is useful to say that the mind and mental states are "logically tied to behaviour". He says that "thought is not speech under suitable circumstances, rather it is something within the person that, in suitable circumstances, brings about speech." He thinks this view is compatible with a Materialist view of the mind, though it is also compatible with non-Materialist views, such as Descartes'.

Armstrong modifies Ryle's behaviourism by suggesting that the mind's dispositions may be explainable by science in Materialist terms, in the same way that glass's brittleness can be explained in terms of molecular structure. Armstrong offers this view as a true account of the mind. It is more fully developed in Belief, Truth and Knowledge (1973), ch. 2, sect. 2.

Armstrong brings together two earlier conclusions: that the mind is "that which stands behind and brings about our complex behaviour"; and that the Behaviourist's dispositions are "states that underlie behaviour and, under certain circumstances, bring about behaviour", and reaches "a conception of a mental state as a state of the person apt for producing certain ranges of behaviour".

=== The problem of consciousness ===
Armstrong now addresses what he calls 'the problem of consciousness': how can the personal experience of consciousness be explained by his Materialist theory of the mind? Armstrong considers times when the brain goes on 'autopilot' - during long drives without breaks, one might suddenly 'come to' and realize that while one has stayed on the road, stopped at red lights and operated the clutch, one was completely unaware of doing so. This shows that it is possible for mental processes to take place without conscious experience.

Before considering how this can be the case, Armstrong describes a method by which a psychologist may determine whether an animal can distinguish between two colours by training it to perform a task that requires this perception. The animal's behaviour would indicate its perception of the colours. While a Behaviourist would say that the animal's behaviour was its perception, Armstrong describes the perception as a state of the animal's mind. It is implied that one could test for consciousness using a similar method.

Further illustrating his idea, Armstrong gives an analogy in which perception is a key to a door, the door being action. The unlocking of the door, and therefore action, is optional, but one cannot open the door without the key. A blind man, for instance, lacks certain keys. As a result, he cannot operate in an environment in the same way that a sighted man can.

Using this conception of perception as a state, Armstrong characterizes consciousness as "perception or awareness of the state of our own mind", or "a self-scanning system in the central nervous system". He sees consciousness not as an external construct that interacts with the body and brain, but as a self-aware state of the physical brain.

== Publishing history ==
- The Nature of Mind and Other Essays, University of Queensland Press, 1980. ISBN 0-7022-1528-7.
- The Nature of Mind and Other Essays, Harvester Press, 1981. ISBN 0-7108-0027-4.
- The Nature of Mind and Other Essays, Cornell University Press, 1981. ISBN 0-8014-1353-2.
