= Materialism =

Philosophical view that matter is the fundamental substance of nature

In philosophy and metaphysics, materialism is a form of monism holding that matter is the fundamental substance of nature, so that all things, including mind and consciousness, arise from material interactions and depend on physical processes, including those of the human brain and nervous system. It contrasts with monistic idealism, which treats consciousness as fundamental, and is related to naturalism, the view that only natural laws and forces operate in the universe, and to physicalism, the view that all that exists is ultimately physical. Physicalism extends materialism by including forms of physicality beyond ordinary matter (e.g. spacetime, energy, forces, exotic matter), and some use the terms interchangeably.

Alternative or opposing views to materialism or physicalism include idealism, pluralism, dualism, solipsism, panpsychism, and other forms of monism.

== Overview ==
Materialism is the philosophical doctrine that matter has a primary position in the nature of the world, with mind or consciousness emerging as a secondary, dependent reality or not existing at all. In its extreme form, materialism asserts that the real world consists of only material things, with the important qualification that space and time must also be included if these are realities rather than mere systems of relations. Materialism belongs to the class of monist ontology, and is thus different from ontological theories based on dualism or pluralism. For singular explanations of the phenomenal reality, materialism is in contrast to idealism, neutral monism, and spiritualism. It can also contrast with phenomenalism, vitalism, and dual-aspect monism. It can be linked to the concept of determinism, as espoused by Enlightenment thinkers.

In contemporary philosophy, the terms "materialism" and "physicalism" are often treated as interchangeable, though they have distinct histories. "Materialism" appears in English toward the end of the 17th century, while "physicalism" was introduced in the 1930s by Otto Neurath and Rudolf Carnap of the Vienna Circle as a linguistic thesis arguing for the translatability of all statements into physical language. One reason to prefer "physicalism" is that physics has revealed entities that are not matter in the classical sense of an inert substance; forces such as gravity are physical but not obviously "material" by the traditional understanding. Modern philosophical materialists extend the definition to include other scientifically observable entities such as energy, forces, and the spacetime continuum; some philosophers, such as Mary Midgley, suggest that the concept of "matter" is elusive and poorly defined.

=== Non-reductive materialism ===
Materialism is often associated with reductionism, according to which the objects or phenomena individuated at one level of description, if they are genuine, must be explicable in terms of the objects or phenomena at some other level of description—typically, at a more reduced level.

Non-reductive materialism explicitly rejects this notion, taking the material constitution of all particulars to be consistent with the existence of real objects, properties or phenomena not explicable in the terms canonically used for the basic material constituents. Jerry Fodor held this view, according to which empirical laws and explanations in "special sciences" like psychology or geology are invisible from the perspective of basic physics.

== History ==
=== Early history ===
==== Before Common Era ====
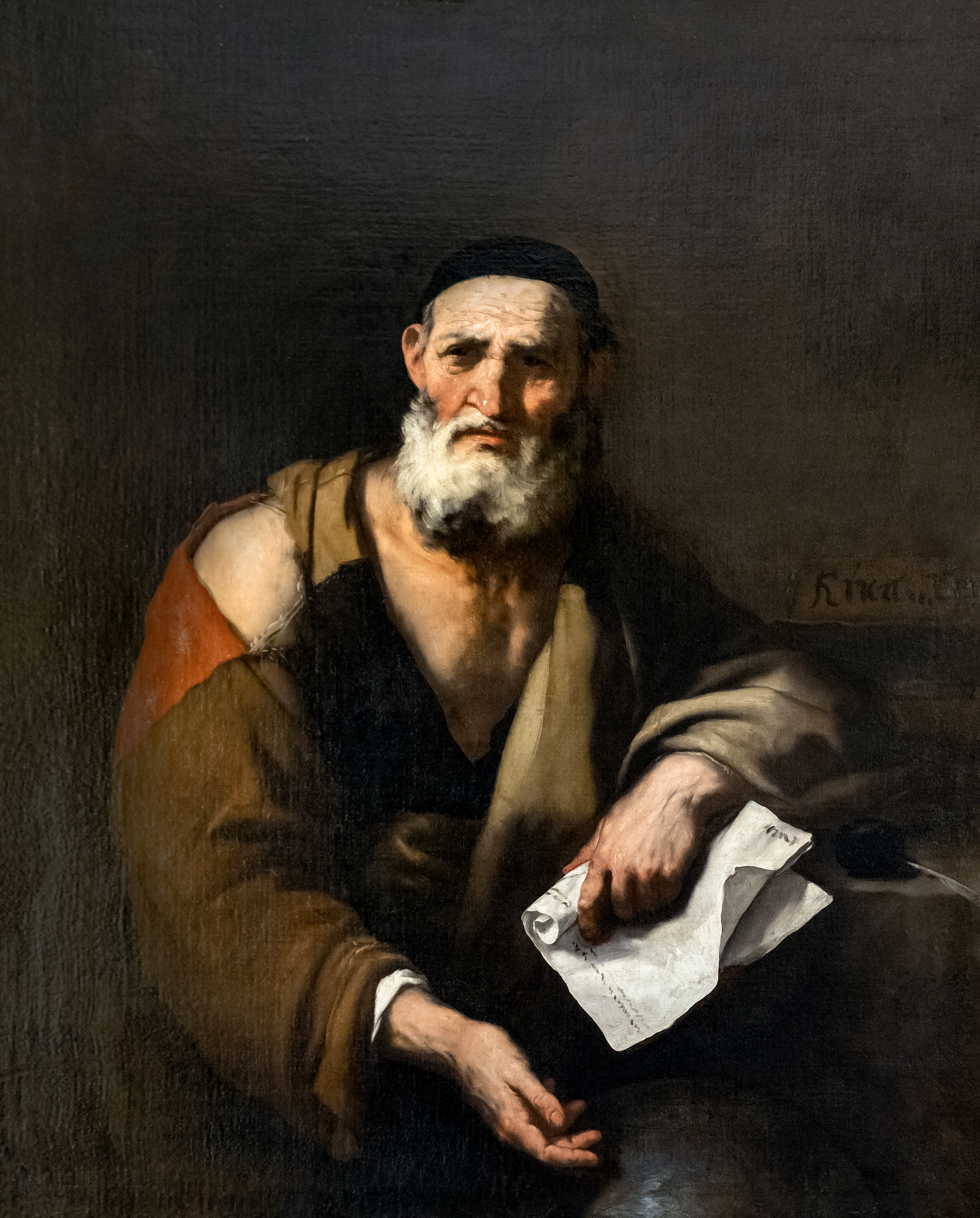
Leucippus (4th century BC), father of atomism and teacher of Democritus. Painting by Luca Giordano, c. 1653.

Materialism developed, possibly independently, in several geographically separated regions of Eurasia during what Karl Jaspers termed the Axial Age (c. 800–200 BC).

In ancient Indian philosophy, materialism developed around 600 BC with the works of Ajita Kesakambali, Payasi, Kanada and the proponents of the Cārvāka school of philosophy. Kanada became one of the early proponents of atomism. The Nyaya–Vaisesika school (c. 600–100 BC) developed one of the earliest forms of atomism (although their proofs of God and their positing that consciousness was not material precludes labelling them as materialists). Buddhist atomism and the Jaina school continued the atomic tradition.

Ancient Greek atomists like Leucippus, Democritus and Epicurus prefigure later materialists. The Latin poem De Rerum Natura by Lucretius (99 – c. 55 BC) reflects the mechanistic philosophy of Democritus and Epicurus. According to this view, all that exists is matter and void, and all phenomena result from different motions and conglomerations of base material particles called atoms (literally "indivisibles"). De Rerum Natura provides mechanistic explanations for phenomena such as erosion, evaporation, wind, and sound. Famous principles like "nothing can touch body but body" first appeared in Lucretius's work. Democritus and Epicurus did not espouse a monist ontology, instead espousing the ontological separation of matter and space (i.e. that space is "another kind" of being).

Epicureanism is a philosophy of materialism from classical antiquity that was a major forerunner of modern science. Classical atomism predates Epicurus: 5th‑century BCE thinkers Leucippus and Democritus explained all change as the collisions of indivisible atoms moving in the void. Epicureanism refined this materialist picture. Epicurus held that everything—including mind—consists solely of atoms moving in the void; to explain how parallel falling atoms could meet, he postulated the clinamen, an extremely slight lateral deviation that initiates collisions without supernatural causes and that need not imply genuine indeterminism.

==== Early Common Era ====
Wang Chong (27 – c. 100 AD) was a Chinese thinker of the early Common Era said to be a materialist. Later Indian materialist Jayaraashi Bhatta (6th century) in his work Tattvopaplavasimha (The Upsetting of All Principles) refuted the Nyāya Sūtra epistemology. The materialistic Cārvāka philosophy appears to have died out some time after 1400; when Madhavacharya compiled Sarva-darśana-samgraha (A Digest of All Philosophies) in the 14th century, he had no Cārvāka (or Lokāyata) text to quote from or refer to.

In early 12th-century al-Andalus, Arabian philosopher Ibn Tufail (a.k.a. Abubacer) discussed materialism in his philosophical novel, Hayy ibn Yaqdhan (Philosophus Autodidactus), while vaguely foreshadowing historical materialism.

==== Modern philosophy ====
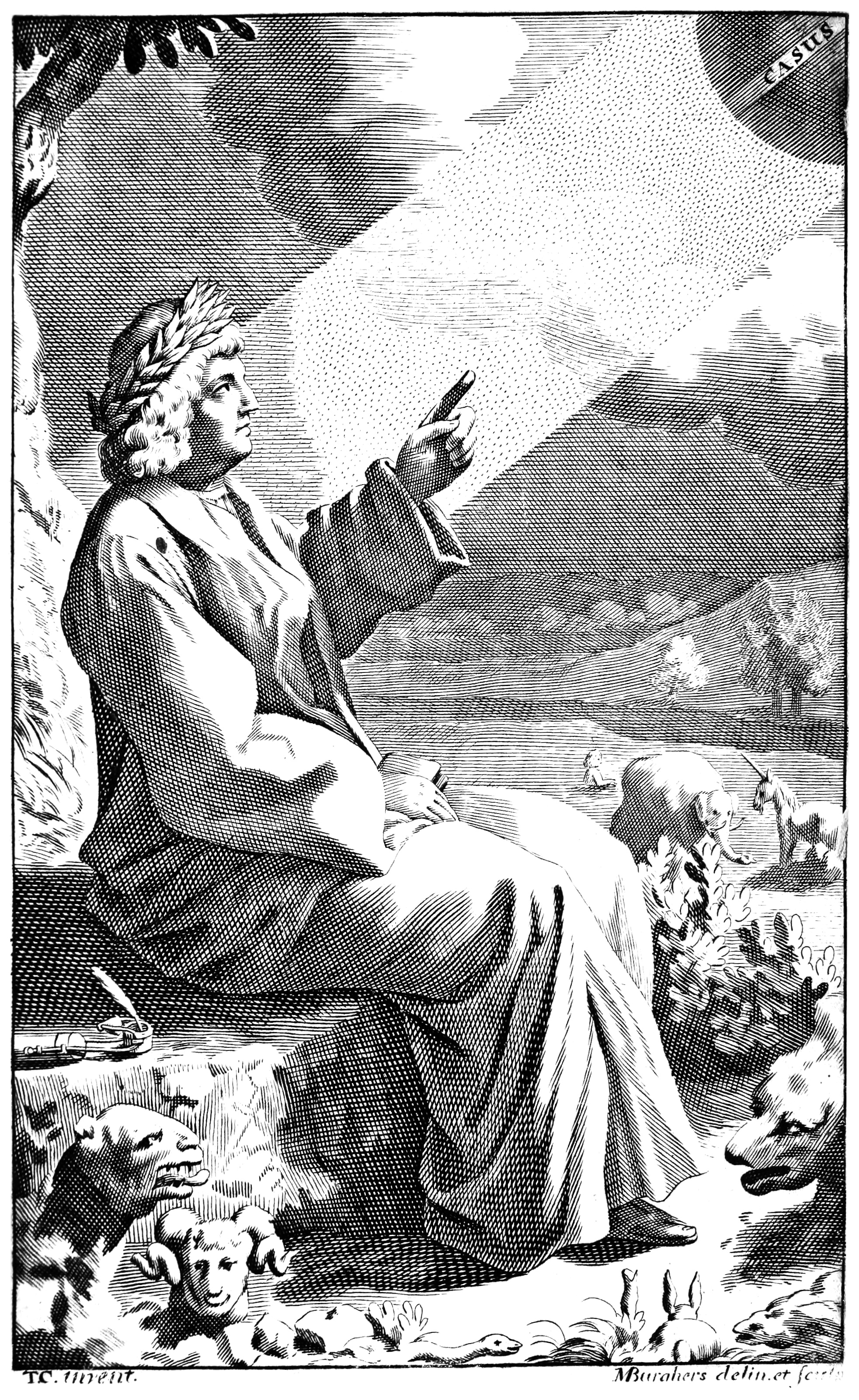
Atomists proposed that the universe consists of atoms moving in space. Of the Nature of Things by Lucretius, 1682.

In France, Pierre Gassendi (1592–1665) represented the materialist tradition in opposition to the attempts of René Descartes (1596–1650) to provide the natural sciences with dualist foundations. There followed the materialist and atheist abbé Jean Meslier (1664–1729), along with the French materialists: Julien Offray de La Mettrie (1709–1751), Denis Diderot (1713–1784), Étienne Bonnot de Condillac (1714–1780), Claude Adrien Helvétius (1715–1771), German-French Baron d'Holbach (1723–1789), and other French Enlightenment thinkers.

In England, materialism was developed in the philosophies of Francis Bacon (1561–1626), Thomas Hobbes (1588–1679), and John Locke (1632–1704). Scottish Enlightenment philosopher David Hume (1711–1776) became one of the most important materialist philosophers in the 18th century. John "Walking" Stewart (1747–1822) believed matter has a moral dimension, which had a major impact on the philosophical poetry of William Wordsworth (1770–1850).

In late modern philosophy, German atheist anthropologist Ludwig Feuerbach signaled a new turn in materialism in his 1841 book The Essence of Christianity, which presented a humanist account of religion as the outward projection of man's inward nature. Feuerbach introduced anthropological materialism, a version of materialism that views materialist anthropology as the universal science.

Feuerbach's variety of materialism heavily influenced Karl Marx, who in the late 19th century elaborated the concept of historical materialism—the basis for what Marx and Friedrich Engels outlined as scientific socialism:

The materialist conception of history starts from the proposition that the production of the means to support human life and, next to production, the exchange of things produced, is the basis of all social structure; that in every society that has appeared in history, the manner in which wealth is distributed and society divided into classes or orders is dependent upon what is produced, how it is produced, and how the products are exchanged. From this point of view, the final causes of all social changes and political revolutions are to be sought, not in men's brains, not in men's better insights into eternal truth and justice, but in changes in the modes of production and exchange. They are to be sought, not in the philosophy, but in the economics of each particular epoch.

— Friedrich Engels, Socialism: Scientific and Utopian (1880)

Through his Dialectics of Nature (1883), Engels later developed a "materialist dialectic" philosophy of nature, a worldview that Georgi Plekhanov, the father of Russian Marxism, called dialectical materialism. In early 20th-century Russian philosophy, Vladimir Lenin further developed dialectical materialism in his 1909 book Materialism and Empirio-criticism, which connects his opponents' political conceptions to their anti-materialist philosophies.

A more naturalist-oriented materialist school of thought that developed in the mid-19th century was German materialism, which included Ludwig Büchner (1824–1899), the Dutch-born Jacob Moleschott (1822–1893), and Carl Vogt (1817–1895), even though they had different views on core issues such as the evolution and the origins of life.

According to Marxist theoretician George Novack, despite the multiplicity of named schools, philosophy ultimately confronts a single binary: materialism versus idealism.

=== Contemporary history ===
==== Analytic philosophy ====
Contemporary analytic philosophers (e.g. Daniel Dennett, Willard Van Orman Quine, Donald Davidson, and Jerry Fodor) operate within a broadly physicalist or scientific materialist framework, producing rival accounts of how best to accommodate the mind, including functionalism, anomalous monism, and identity theory.

Scientific materialism is often synonymous with, and has typically been described as, a reductive materialism. In the early 21st century, Paul and Patricia Churchland advocated a radically contrasting position (at least in regard to certain hypotheses): eliminative materialism. Eliminative materialism holds that some mental phenomena simply do not exist at all, and that talk of such phenomena reflects a spurious "folk psychology" and introspection illusion. A materialist of this variety might believe that a concept like "belief" has no basis in fact (e.g. the way folk science speaks of demon-caused illnesses).

With reductive materialism at one end of a continuum (our theories will reduce to facts) and eliminative materialism at the other (certain theories will need to be eliminated in light of new facts), revisionary materialism is somewhere in the middle.

In contrast, Christian List argues that the existence of first-person perspectives, i.e., one existing as oneself and not as someone else, refutes physicalism. List argues that since first-personal facts cannot supervene on physical facts, this refutes not only physicalism, but also most forms of dualism that have purely third-personal metaphysics.

==== Continental philosophy ====
Contemporary continental philosopher Gilles Deleuze attempted to rework and strengthen classical materialist ideas. Contemporary theorists such as Manuel DeLanda, working with this reinvigorated materialism, have come to be classified as new materialists. New materialism has become its own subfield, with courses on it at major universities, as well as numerous conferences, edited collections and monographs devoted to it. Jane Bennett's 2010 book Vibrant Matter has been particularly instrumental in bringing theories of monist ontology and vitalism back into a critical theoretical fold dominated by poststructuralist theories of language and discourse. New materialism has been criticized by scholars of critical race, Indigenous, and queer studies, who argue it neglects questions of race, gender, and colonialism, and by others who question whether its claims are genuinely novel given that Indigenous and animist traditions have long held views about the agency or vitality of matter.

In Being and Event (1988), Alain Badiou developed a materialist position using Zermelo–Fraenkel set theory. Badiou argues that mathematics, rather than physics or human perception, reveals the metaphysical structure of reality, and that this structure is pure multiplicity without any foundational substance or unifying One.

Quentin Meillassoux has developed speculative materialism, a position that seeks to escape what he calls "correlationism", the post-Kantian view that thought cannot access reality independent of its relation to the subject.

== Defining "matter" ==
The nature and definition of matter—like other key concepts in science and philosophy—have occasioned much debate:

- Is there a single kind of matter (hyle) that everything is made of, or are there multiple kinds?
- Is matter a continuous substance capable of expressing multiple forms (hylomorphism) or a number of discrete, unchanging constituents (atomism)?
- Does matter have intrinsic properties (substance theory) or lack them (prima materia)?

One challenge to the conventional concept of matter as tangible "stuff" came with the rise of field physics in the 19th century. Relativity shows that matter and energy (including the spatially distributed energy of fields) are interchangeable. This enables the ontological view that energy is prima materia and matter is one of its forms. In contrast, the Standard Model of particle physics uses quantum field theory to describe all interactions. On this view it could be said that fields are prima materia and the energy is a property of the field.

According to the dominant cosmological model, the Lambda-CDM model, less than 5% of the universe's energy density is made up of the "matter" the Standard Model describes, and most of the universe is composed of dark matter and dark energy, with little agreement among scientists about what these are made of.

With the advent of quantum physics, some scientists believed the concept of matter had merely changed, while others believed the conventional position could no longer be maintained. Werner Heisenberg said: "The ontology of materialism rested upon the illusion that the kind of existence, the direct 'actuality' of the world around us, can be extrapolated into the atomic range. This extrapolation, however, is impossible...atoms are not things."

The concept of matter has changed in response to new scientific discoveries. Thus materialism has no definite content independent of the particular theory of matter on which it is based. According to Noam Chomsky, any property can be considered material, if one defines matter such that it has that property.

The philosophical materialist Gustavo Bueno uses a more precise term than matter, the stroma.

== Physicalism ==
George Stack distinguishes between materialism and physicalism:

In the twentieth century, physicalism has emerged out of positivism. Physicalism restricts meaningful statements to physical bodies or processes that are verifiable or in principle verifiable. It is an empirical hypothesis that is subject to revision and, hence, lacks the dogmatic stance of classical materialism. Herbert Feigl defended physicalism in the United States and consistently held that mental states are brain states and that mental terms have the same referent as physical terms. The twentieth century has witnessed many materialist theories of the mental, and much debate surrounding them.

But not all conceptions of physicalism are tied to verificationist theories of meaning or direct realist accounts of perception. Rather, physicalists believe that no "element of reality" is missing from the mathematical formalism of our best description of the world. "Materialist" physicalists also believe that the formalism describes fields of insentience. In other words, the intrinsic nature of the physical is non-experiential.

== Criticism and alternatives ==
=== From contemporary physicists ===
Rudolf Peierls, a physicist who played a major role in the Manhattan Project, rejected materialism: "The premise that you can describe in terms of physics the whole function of a human being ... including knowledge and consciousness, is untenable. There is still something missing."

Erwin Schrödinger said, "Consciousness cannot be accounted for in physical terms. For consciousness is absolutely fundamental. It cannot be accounted for in terms of anything else."

Werner Heisenberg said the advent of quantum physics had undermined atomistic materialism. Specifically, he argued that the discovery of quantum entities existing as probability amplitudes rather than definite particles supports a mathematical, Platonic realist, rather than materialist, conception of physical reality, arguing that "modern physics takes a definite stand against the materialism of Democritus and for Plato and the Pythagoreans".

==== Quantum mechanics ====
Some 20th-century physicists (e.g., Eugene Wigner and Henry Stapp), and some modern physicists and science writers (e.g., Stephen Barr, Paul Davies, and John Gribbin) have argued that materialism is flawed due to certain recent findings in physics, such as quantum mechanics and chaos theory. According to Gribbin and Davies (1991):

Then came our Quantum theory, which totally transformed our image of matter. The old assumption that the microscopic world of atoms was simply a scaled-down version of the everyday world had to be abandoned. Newton's deterministic machine was replaced by a shadowy and paradoxical conjunction of waves and particles, governed by the laws of chance, rather than the rigid rules of causality. An extension of the quantum theory goes beyond even this; it paints a picture in which solid matter dissolves away, to be replaced by weird excitations and vibrations of invisible field energy. Quantum physics undermines materialism because it reveals that matter has far less "substance" than we might believe. But another development goes even further by demolishing Newton's image of matter as inert lumps. This development is the theory of chaos, which has recently gained widespread attention.

— Paul Davies and John Gribbin, The Matter Myth, Chapter 1: "The Death of Materialism"

==== Digital physics ====
The objections of Davies and Gribbin are shared by proponents of digital physics, who view information rather than matter as fundamental. The physicist and proponent of digital physics John Archibald Wheeler wrote, "all matter and all things physical are information-theoretic in origin and this is a participatory universe." Some founders of quantum theory, such as Max Planck, shared their objections. He wrote:

As a man who has devoted his whole life to the most clear headed science, to the study of matter, I can tell you as a result of my research about atoms this much: There is no matter as such. All matter originates and exists only by virtue of a force which brings the particle of an atom to vibration and holds this most minute solar system of the atom together. We must assume behind this force the existence of a conscious and intelligent Mind. This Mind is the matrix of all matter.

— Max Planck, Das Wesen der Materie (1944)

James Jeans concurred with Planck, saying, "The Universe begins to look more like a great thought than like a great machine. Mind no longer appears to be an accidental intruder into the realm of matter."

=== Philosophical objections ===
In the Critique of Pure Reason, Immanuel Kant argued against materialism in defending his transcendental idealism (as well as offering arguments against subjective idealism and mind–body dualism). But Kant argues that change and time require an enduring substrate.

Postmodern/poststructuralist thinkers also express skepticism about any all-encompassing metaphysical scheme. Philosopher Mary Midgley argues that materialism is a self-refuting idea, at least in its eliminative materialist form.

==== Varieties of idealism ====
Arguments for idealism, such as those of Hegel and Berkeley, often take the form of an argument against materialism; indeed, Berkeley's idealism was called immaterialism. Now, matter can be argued to be redundant, as in bundle theory, and mind-independent properties can, in turn, be reduced to subjective percepts. Berkeley gives an example of the latter by pointing out that it is impossible to gather direct evidence of matter, as there is no direct experience of matter; all that is experienced is perception, whether internal or external. As such, matter's existence can only be inferred from the apparent (perceived) stability of perceptions; it finds absolutely no evidence in direct experience.

If matter and energy are seen as necessary to explain the physical world, but incapable of explaining mind, dualism results. Emergence, holism and process philosophy seek to ameliorate the perceived shortcomings of traditional (especially mechanistic) materialism without abandoning materialism entirely.

=== Materialism as methodology ===
Some critics object to materialism as part of an overly skeptical, narrow or reductivist approach to theorizing, rather than to the ontological claim that matter is the only substance. Particle physicist and Anglican theologian John Polkinghorne objects to what he calls promissory materialism—claims that materialistic science will eventually succeed in explaining phenomena it has not so far been able to explain. Polkinghorne prefers "dual-aspect monism" to materialism.

Some scientific materialists have been criticized for failing to provide clear definitions of matter, leaving the term materialism without any definite meaning. Noam Chomsky states that since the concept of matter may be affected by new scientific discoveries, as has happened in the past, scientific materialists are being dogmatic in assuming the opposite.

== See also ==
- Aleatory materialism
- Australian materialism
- Antimaterialism beliefs:
  - Gnosticism
  - Idealism
  - Immaterialism
  - Maya (religion)
  - Mind–body dualism
  - Platonic realism
  - Supernaturalism
  - Transcendentalism
- Cārvāka
- Central-state materialism
- Christian materialism
- Critical realism
- Cultural materialism
- Dialectical materialism
- Economic materialism
- Existence
- French materialism
- Grotesque body
- Historical materialism
- Hyle
- Incorporeality
- Marxist philosophy of nature
- Materialist feminism
- Metaphysical naturalism
- Model-dependent realism
- Naturalism (philosophy)
- Philosophical materialism
- Philosophy of mind
- Physicalism
- Postmaterialism
- Reality in Buddhism
- Russian materialism
- Scientistic materialism
- Substance theory
- Transcendence (religion)

== Notes ==
a. Indeed, it has been noted it is difficult if not impossible to define one category without contrasting it with the other.

== Bibliography ==
- Campbell, Keith (2006). "Materialism". Encyclopedia of Philosophy. Vol. 6 (2nd ed.). Macmillan Reference USA. pp. 5–18.
- Stoljar, Daniel (25 May 2021). "Physicalism". Stanford Encyclopedia of Philosophy.
