= A. J. Baker =

Australian philosopher

Allan James "Jim" Baker (22 July 1922 – 3 March 2017) was an Australian philosopher who was best known for having systematised the realist philosophy of John Anderson. He studied under Anderson at Sydney University and had taught philosophy in Scotland, New Zealand, the United States and Australia. He was a prominent member of the Sydney Libertarians and the Sydney Push. He instigated, and was a prolific contributor to, several journals, compilations and newsletters that addressed issues, philosophical and otherwise, associated with Sydney Libertarianism. Among these were Libertarian (1957–1960), Broadsheet (1960–1979), The Sydney Line: A Selection of Comments and Criticisms (1963), Heraclitus (1980–2006) and The Sydney Realist (2005–). In 1997 he published a monograph, Social Pluralism: A Realistic Analysis, in which he posited his exposition of human social life.

== Bibliography ==
- Anderson's Social Philosophy: The Social Thought and Political Life of Professor John Anderson, Sydney: Angus and Robertson (1979)
- Australian Realism: The Systematic Philosophy of John Anderson, Cambridge University Press (1986)
- Social Pluralism: A Realistic Analysis, Wild and Woolley, Glebe NSW (1997).
