= Eugene Kamenka =

Australian philosopher

Eugene Kamenka (4 March 1928 – 19 January 1994) was an Australian political philosopher and Marxist scholar.

== Biography ==
Kamenka was born in Cologne in 1928 and migrated to Australia with his parents in 1937. He was of Russian-Jewish origin. He was educated at the Sydney Technical High School, and after interrupting his studies went to Jerusalem where he married his first wife Miriam Mizrachi. Later, he returned to Sydney University by her encouragement to complete his degree and begin work on his later published thesis "The Ethical Foundations of Marxism" for the Australian national university, published 1962. Professor John Anderson of Sydney University was a key influence in his early career.

Kamenka lectured in philosophy at the University of Singapore where he met his second wife, Alice Tay and went on to lecture and research around Europe, North America, and Asia. He was a Professor and the Head of the History of Ideas Unit at the Institute of Advanced Studies of the Australian National University, and lived in Canberra. Together with Tay, a professor of jurisprudence at Sydney University and scholar of comparative and Asian legal systems, he authored several works in philosophy of law and comparative law.

He died in Canberra.

== Works ==
- The Ethical Foundations of Marxism (1962)
- Marxism and Ethics (1969)
- A World in Revolution? (1970)
- The Philosophy of Ludwig Feuerbach (1970)
- Nationalism: The Nature and Evolution of an Idea (1976)
- The Portable Karl Marx (1983)
- Bureaucracy (1989)

== See also ==
- Karl Marx
- Marxist Humanism
- Ethics
