= John Passmore =

Australian philosopher

John Passmore AC FAHA
- Born: John Arthur Passmore; 9 September 1914; Manly, Sydney, Australia
- Died: 25 July 2004 (aged 89); Canberra, Australian Capital Territory, Australia

Education
- Education: University of Sydney (BA, MA)
- Academic advisor: John Anderson

Philosophical work
- Era: 20th-century philosophy
- Region: Western philosophy
- School: Analytic philosophy
- Institutions: University of Sydney, University of Otago, Australian National University
- Main interests: History of philosophy, ethics, philosophy of teaching
- Notable ideas: Environmental ethics grounded in existing moral traditions

John Arthur Passmore (9 September 1914 – 25 July 2004) was an Australian philosopher.

== Life ==
John Passmore was born on 9 September 1914 in Manly, Sydney, where he grew up. He was educated at Sydney Boys High School. He originally aspired to be a school teacher, but the terms of his employment required him to do coursework in philosophy, a discipline which was to absorb him. He subsequently graduated from the University of Sydney with first-class honours in English literature and philosophy whilst studying with a view to become a secondary-school teacher. In 1934 he accepted the position of assistant lecturer in philosophy at the University of Sydney, continuing teaching there until 1949. In 1948 he went to study at the University of London.

From 1950 to 1955 he was (the first) professor of philosophy at the University of Otago in New Zealand. In 1955 he spent a year at the University of Oxford on a Carnegie grant. Upon his return to Australia he took up a post at the Institute of Advanced Studies at the Australian National University, where he was professor of philosophy in the Research School of Social Sciences from 1958 to 1979.

He was a Foundation Fellow of the Australian Academy of the Humanities in 1969.

In 1960 he was Ziskind visiting professor at Brandeis University in the United States. He subsequently lectured in England, the United States, Mexico, Japan, and in various European countries.

He also served as a director and then later as governor of the Australian Elizabethan Theatre Trust.

In 1994 he was appointed a Companion of the Order of Australia (AC), Australia's highest civilian honour.

Passmore died on 25 July 2004 and was survived by his wife Doris and two daughters.

== Work ==
Passmore was as much a historian of ideas as a philosopher, and his scholarship always paid careful attention to the complex historical context of philosophical problems. He published about twenty books, many of which have been translated. Philosopher Frank Jackson notes that Passmore "shaped public debate and opened up philosophy and history of ideas to the wider world".

In his book Man's Responsibility for Nature (1974) Passmore argued that there is urgent need to change our attitude to the environment, and that humans cannot continue unconstrained exploitation of the biosphere. However, he rejected the view that we need to abandon the Western tradition of scientific rationalism, and was unsympathetic towards attempts to articulate environmental concern through radical revisions of our ethical framework, as advocated by deep ecologists, which he conceived as misguided mysticism or irrationalism. Passmore was very skeptical about attempts to attribute intrinsic value to nature, and his preferred position was of valuing nature in terms of what it contributes to the flourishing of sentient creatures (including humans). According to William Grey of the International Society for Environmental Ethics, his "unequivocal anthropocentrism made him a reference point in the discourse of environmental ethics and many treatises in field begin with (or include) a refutation of his views".

Passmore described himself as a "pessimistic humanist" who regarded neither human beings nor human societies as perfectible.

== Bibliography ==
Books

- Reading and Remembering (1942, 1943, 1963)
- Talking Things Over (1945)
- Ralph Cudworth (1951)
- Hume's Intentions (1952)
- Philosophical Reasoning (1961)
- Joseph Priestley (1965)
- Hundred Years of Philosophy (1957, 1967)
- The Perfectibility of Man (1970)
- Man's Responsibility for Nature (1974, 1980)
- Science and Its Critics (1978)
- The Philosophy of Teaching (1980)
- The Limits of Government (1981) (the 1981 Boyer Lectures)
- Recent Philosophers (1985)
- Serious Art: A Study of the Concept in All the Major Arts (1991)
- Memoirs of a Semi-detached Australian (1997)

Select articles

- "Locke and the Ethics of Belief" (1978)

For a more complete list of publications see PhilPapers.
