= The Philosophical Quarterly =

- Discipline: Philosophy
- Language: English

Publication details
- History: 1950–present
- Publisher: Oxford Academic
- Frequency: Quarterly

Standard abbreviations
- ISO 4: Philos. Q.

Indexing
- ISSN: 0031-8094 (print); 1467-9213 (web)
- LCCN: sn98-23309
- JSTOR: 00318094
- OCLC no.: 40108893

Links
- Journal homepage; Journal page at University of St Andrews

The Philosophical Quarterly is a quarterly academic journal of philosophy established in 1950 and published by Wiley-Blackwell on behalf of the Scots Philosophical Club and the University of St Andrews. Since 2014 its publisher is Oxford Academic. Every year the journal holds an Essay Prize. The journal is considered one of the top-ten publication venues in general philosophy.

== Notable articles ==
- "Extreme and Restricted Utilitarianism" (1956) – J.J.C. Smart
- "Rawls' Theory of Justice" (1973) – R.M. Hare
- "Epiphenomenal Qualia" (1982) – Frank Jackson
- "De Re Senses" (1984) – John McDowell
- "Jackson on Physical Information and Qualia" – Terrance Horgan
- "Dispositions and Conditionals" (1994) – C. B. Martin
- "The Content of Perceptual Experience" (1994) – John McDowell
- "Are We Living in a Computer Simulation?" (2003) – Nick Bostrom
