= Australian realism =

Philosophical school

Australian realism, also called Australian materialism, is a school of philosophy that flourished in the first half of the 20th century in several universities in Australia including the Australian National University, the University of Adelaide, and the University of Sydney, and whose central claim, as stated by leading theorist John Anderson, was that "whatever exists … is real, that is to say it is a spatial and temporal situation or occurrence that is on the same level of reality as anything else that exists". Coupled with this was Anderson's idea that "every fact (which includes every “object”) is a complex situation: there are no simples, no atomic facts, no objects which cannot be, as it were, expanded into facts." Prominent players included Anderson, David Malet Armstrong, J. L. Mackie, Ullin Place, J. J. C. Smart, and David Stove. The label "Australian realist" was conferred on acolytes of Anderson by A. J. Baker in 1986, to mixed approval from those realist philosophers who happened to be Australian. David Malet Armstrong "suggested, half-seriously, that 'the strong sunlight and harsh brown landscape of Australia force reality upon us'".

== Origins ==
Australian realism began after John Anderson accepted the Challis Chair of Philosophy at the University of Sydney in 1927. His students included philosophers such as John Passmore, J. L. Mackie, David Stove, Eugene Kamenka and David Malet Armstrong. Anderson viewed philosophy historically as a long argument beginning with Thales. Anderson proposed that there was nothing more to being than the spatio-temporal system and that a correct and coherent view of the world involved not only rejecting any sort of deity, but also the extraordinary entities postulated by so many philosophers, from at least the time of Plato to the present day.

Independently from the Andersonians, in Adelaide during the 1950s, the mind–brain identity theory was being developed by two former students of Gilbert Ryle, J. J. C. Smart (then Chair of Philosophy at the University of Adelaide) and Ullin Place.

== Basic tenets ==
(1) All entities exist in spatio-temporal 'situations'. 'Situations' are all that exist. All situations have the same ontological status. There are no 'levels' of reality.

(2) All situations have a propositional form — that is, all situations have the form of "A is B".

(3) Reality is infinitely complex and plural. Every fact (which includes every “object”) is a complex situation: there are no simples, no atomic facts, no objects which cannot be expanded into facts.

(4) All situations exist independent of knowledge of them.

(5) Determinism: all entities — objects, events, situations — are caused.

(6) Ethics is concerned with establishing and describing what is Good. This is a positive science. It is not normative.

== Philosophy of mathematics ==
James Franklin and the "Sydney School" develop the Anderson-Armstrong "one level of reality" view into a philosophy of mathematics that is opposed to both Platonism and nominalism. Their Aristotelian realist philosophy of mathematics holds that mathematics studies properties such as symmetry, continuity and order that can be immanently realized in the physical world (or in any other world there might be).

== See also ==
- Analytic philosophy
- Australian philosophy
- Logical positivism
