= The Philosophical Lexicon =

The Philosophical Lexicon is a humorous dictionary founded by philosopher Daniel Dennett and now edited by Asbjørn Steglich-Petersen. It lists neologisms that have been humorously coined from the names of (mostly) contemporary philosophers. For example, the following definition refers to the philosopher Willard Van Orman Quine:

quine, v. (1) To deny resolutely the existence or importance of something real or significant. "Some philosophers have quined classes, and some have even quined physical objects." Occasionally used intr., e.g., "You think I quine, sir. I assure you I do not!" (2) n. The total aggregate sensory surface of the world; hence quinitis, irritation of the quine.
