= Graham Oppy =

Australian philosopher (born 1960)

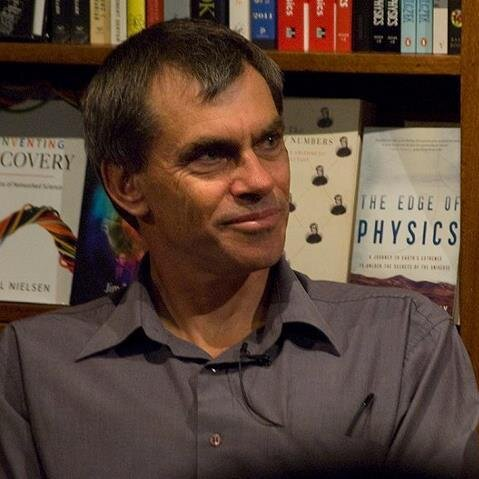
- Oppy in 2021
- Born: Graham Robert Oppy; 6 October 1960 (age 66); Benalla, Victoria, Australia

Education
- Education: University of Melbourne; Princeton University
- Thesis: Attitude Problems: Semantics for Propositional Attitude Ascriptions (1990)
- Doctoral advisor: Gilbert Harman

Philosophical work
- Era: Contemporary philosophy
- Region: Western philosophy
- School: Analytic philosophy
- Institutions: University of Wollongong; Australian National University; Monash University
- Main interests: Philosophy of religion; metaphysics; epistemology
- Notable ideas: "The best argument against God" (while naturalism is simpler than theism, there is no relevant data that naturalism fails to explain at least as well as theism does)

Graham Robert Oppy (born 1960) is an Australian philosopher whose main area of research is the philosophy of religion. He is Professor of Philosophy and Associate Dean of Research at Monash University, CEO of the Australasian Association of Philosophy, chief editor of the Australasian Philosophical Review, associate editor of the Australasian Journal of Philosophy, and he is on the editorial boards of Philo, Philosopher's Compass, Religious Studies, and Sophia. He was elected fellow of the Australian Academy of the Humanities in 2009.

== Biography ==
Graham Oppy was born in Benalla on 6 October 1960 to a Methodist family, but he ceased to be a religious believer as a young teenager and is now an atheist. His family moved to Ballarat in 1965, and he had his secondary schooling at Wesley College, Melbourne. He attended Melbourne University from 1979, where he completed two degrees: a BA (honours) in philosophy and a BSc in mathematics. In 1987, he started graduate work at Princeton University under the supervision of Gilbert Harman on questions in the philosophy of language.

He was a lecturer at the University of Wollongong from 1990 to 1992, and after doing a post-doc at the Australian National University, he moved to Monash as a senior lecturer and was promoted to professor in 2005. He is currently Associate Dean of Research (since 2004) and Associate Dean of Graduate Studies in the Faculty of Arts at Monash University.

Oppy is considered by some philosophers (including William Lane Craig and Edward Feser) to be the most formidable defender of atheism living today. Oppy has distanced himself from this characterization, however.

== Books ==
- Ontological Arguments and Belief in God, 1996 ISBN 0-521-48120-1.
- Philosophical Perspectives on Infinity, 2006 ISBN 0-521-86067-9.
- Arguing About Gods, 2006 ISBN 0-521-86386-4.
- "Evolution vs Creationism in Australian Schools", chapter in The Australian Book of Atheism, 2010 ISBN 978-1-921640-76-6.
- The Best Argument Against God, 2013 ISBN 978-1-137-35413-6
- Reinventing Philosophy of Religion: An Opinionated Introduction, 2014 ISBN 978-1-137-43455-5
- Describing Gods: An Investigation of Divine Attributes, 2014 ISBN 978-1-107-08704-0
- The Routledge Handbook of Contemporary Philosophy of Religion (Routledge Handbooks in Philosophy), 2017 ISBN 978-1-138-57405-2
- Atheism and Agnosticism (Elements in the Philosophy of Religion), 2018 ISBN 978-1-108-45472-8
- Atheism: The Basics, 2018 ISBN 978-1-138-50696-1
- Naturalism and Religion: A Contemporary Philosophical Investigation (Investigating Philosophy of Religion), 2018 ISBN 978-0-815-35466-6
- (with Joseph Koterski) Theism and Atheism: Opposing Arguments in Philosophy, 2018 ISBN 978-0028664453
- A Companion to Atheism and Philosophy (Blackwell Companions to Philosophy), 2019 ISBN 978-1-119-11911-1
- Is There a God?: A Debate (Little Debates about Big Questions), 2021 ISBN 978-0367243944
