= Julius Kovesi =

Australian philosopher (1930-1989)

- Born: Julius Kovesi; 1930; Budapest, Hungary
- Died: 17 August 1989 (aged 58–59); Perth, Western Australia

Education
- Education: University of Oxford (BPhil)

Philosophical work
- Era: 20th-century philosophy
- Region: Western philosophy
- School: Analytic
- Institutions: University of Western Australia
- Main interests: Australian philosophy
- Notable ideas: formal/material concepts

Julius Kovesi (1930 – 17 August 1989) was an Australian moral philosopher. He was the author of Moral Notions (1967) and other papers on moral concepts. His originality, distinctive contribution and his importance as a contributor to Wittgensteinian moral philosophy have been remarked upon in critical literature.

== Biography ==
Kovesi was born in Budapest in 1930. He grew up in Tata, Hungary, where his architect father managed a brick and tile making factory. Initially he went to university in Budapest, attending lectures given by George Lukács. In 1948 Julius Kovesi and his brother Paul were concerned by the Communist takeover of the education system and the increasingly authoritarian stance of their country. They decided to flee to Austria, but on their first attempt they were intercepted by border guards. Julius Kovesi tried to use logic to argue his way out of their arrest, saying they were just foolish bourgeois students looking to enjoy Paris before the forthcoming collapse of Capitalism. It was partly successful: they were beaten up, but allowed to return to Budapest. They were more fortunate getting over the frontier on a second attempt a few days later, and ended up in Innsbruck, which was in the French zone of Allied-occupied Austria.

Later their parents were able to join the brothers in Austria. In 1950 the family emigrated to Perth, Australia, Julius Kovesi adopted Australian nationality and entered the Australian higher education system.

Kovesi won a Hackett scholarship to Balliol College, Oxford University, where he took a B.Phil degree and formed friendship with members of the Wartime Quartet, in particular, Mary Midgley and Philippa Foot. In 2004, Foot wrote of Kovesi:

I had known Julius when he was at Oxford when he and I were allies — members of a small band of guerrillas fighting the prevailing orthodoxy of anti-naturalist emotivism and prescriptivism in ethics, and challenging the Humean doctrine of the gap between ‘is’ and ‘ought’. At that time we were rank outsiders and even in 1967 when Moral Notions was first published it must have been hard to get recognition for such an iconoclastic approach.

At Oxford Kovesi (and his future wife Janet Green-Armytage) were influenced by lectures given by the philosopher of language, Professor J. L. Austin, which later had an impact on his book, Moral Notions. Kovesi then accepted academic posts at universities in Edinburgh and New South Wales. In 1963 he returned to the University of Western Australia, where he taught until a week before his death in Perth, 1989, from complications during cardiac surgery.

His father was of Jewish heritage but Julius Kovesi as a boy attended a Piarist school and had a lifelong Roman Catholic faith. He felt estranged from the church, and abandoned worship, for a period in the 1980s, but returned to the church in the months before his death.

== Philosophical Work ==
Kovesi’s moral philosophy can be summarised under four headings.

=== The theory of meaning ===
Kovesi sees concepts as having two dimensions. The “material elements” of a concept are the various ways in which a concept can be instantiated. The “formal element” of a concept is the role that the concept has in human social practices.

=== Moral concepts ===
On Kovesi's view, typical examples of moral concepts are “murder”, “prejudice”, “stealing” and “cruelty”. These he calls “complete” moral concepts. Some concepts are “incomplete”; when they are not completely formed from the moral point of view (his usual example is “killing”).

=== Facts and values ===
Moral reasoning and argument does not start from a set of “neutral” facts and reason to a moral conclusion. No argument, whether scientific or moral or other, proceeds in that way. Rather, we start from human interests, as expressed in our value concepts, and we proceed to look for facts that are relevant to those interests. In that way, moral reasoning is no different from any other reasoning.

=== Description and evaluation ===
Moral claims are not evaluative. In making an evaluation we are ranking or rating some particular under some description. For example, we rate or rank a particular holiday under the concept “holiday”. In moral matters we are trying to find the most appropriate description of a given or a proposed action. For example, would the action be correctly described as “murder” or “manslaughter” or “self-defence”?

== Works ==
- Moral Notions (London: Routledge and Kegan Paul, 1967). This version is held by libraries, however it was reissued in 2004 with additional biographical details and is available online.
- ‘Valuing and Evaluating’, Jowett Papers, B.Y. Khanbhai et al eds, Blackwell 1970.
- ‘Against the Ritual of “Is” and “Ought”’, Midwest Studies in Philosophy, III, 1978, 5–16.
- ‘Descriptions and Reasons’, Proceedings of the Aristotelian Society of 1979–80, 101–113.
- ‘Principia Ethica Re-examined: The Ethics of a Proto-Logical Atomism’, Philosophy, 1984, 157–170.
- Values and Evaluations. Essays on Ethics and Ideology, Alan Tapper ed., with an Introduction by Alan Tapper and Janet Kovesi Watt (New York: Peter Lang, 1998), 13–70.
