= Martine Nida-Rümelin =

German philosopher (born 1957)

Martine Nida-Rümelin (born 1957) is a German philosopher.

== Biography ==
Nida-Rümelin studied philosophy, psychology, mathematics, and political science at LMU Munich.

In her doctoral thesis, she discusses the knowledge argument by the Australian philosopher Frank Jackson, which is directed against a materialist conception of phenomenal consciousness. Therein, she presents a key argument based on qualia- that is, individual instances of subjective, conscious experience.

Her transformed version of the Mary's room thought-experiment has been much discussed and coined the "Nida-Rümelin room" by John Perry. In her habilitation she developed a non-reductionist view about the identity of conscious individuals. In 2019, she won the Jean Nicod Prize.

She is the daughter of the sculptor Rolf Nida-Rümelin, the granddaughter of the sculptor Wilhelm Nida-Rümelin and the sister of the philosopher and politician Julian Nida-Rümelin.

== Academic career ==
Since 1999, she has been a professor at the University of Fribourg in Switzerland. Her main areas of interest are philosophy of mind, theory of knowledge and philosophy of language. The major part of her published work is concerned with the special status of conscious individuals and aims at developing a non-materialist account which avoids the weaknesses of traditional dualism. Phenomenal consciousness, identity of conscious beings through time and across possible worlds, and the active role of the subject in its doings are central themes of her research. Rational intuitions and phenomenological reflection play a prominent role in her philosophical approach. Between 2019 and 2022, she was visiting professor at the University of Italian Switzerland.

Nida-Rümelin defends a position she calls Subject-Body Dualism.

== Selected publications ==
- Farben und phänomenales Wissen. Eine Kritik materialistischer Theorien des Geistes, Conceptus Sonderband, Academia, St. Augustin 1993.
- Der besondere Status von Personen: Eine Anomalie für die Theorie praktischer Rationalität. in: Julian Nida-Rümelin und Ulrike Wessels (Hg.): Praktische Rationalität, de Gruyter, Berlin, 1993, S.143-166.
- Was Mary nicht wissen konnte. Phänomenale Zustände als Gegenstand von Überzeugungen. In Thomas Metzinger (Hg.): Bewußtsein, Beiträge aus der Gegenwartsphilosophie, Schöningh, Paderborn, 1995, S.259-282.
- Pseudonormal Vision and Color Qualia, in Stuart Hameroff, Alfred Kaszniak und David Chalmers (Hg.) "Toward a Science of Consciousness III, The Third Tucson Discussions and Debates", MIT Press, 1999, S.75-84.
- Grasping Phenomenal Properties, in Torin Alter & Sven Walter (Hrg.), Phenomenal Belief and Phenomenal Concepts, Oxford University Press, 2004.
- Der Blick von innen. Zur transtemporalen Identität bewusstseinsfähiger Wesen. Suhrkamp, Frankfurt am Main, 2006.
- Dualist Emergentism, in Jonathan Cohen & Brian McLaughlin, Contemporary Debates in Philosophy of Mind, Blackwell Publishing.
- Die Person als Autor ihres Tuns. Bemerkungen zur Deutung neurobiologischer Daten, in Adrian Holderegger u.a. (ed.), Hirnforschung und Menschenbild, Fribourg Academic Press, 2008.
- The conceptual origin of subject body dualism, in Annalisa Colliva (ed.), Self and Self-Knowledge, Oxford University Press.
