= Purushottama Bilimoria =

Australian-American philosopher and professor

Purushottama Bilimoria is an Australian-American philosopher and former Professor at O.P. Jindal Global University (India). He is presently teaching faculty at University of San Francisco, California (US).

He studied at the University of Auckland (BA) and the University of Otago (PGDiplArts), in New Zealand, and received his PhD in 1983 from La Trobe University in Australia. Currently, he is appointed Head of Purushottama Research Center for Philosophy and Culture of India, and Scholar at the Peoples' Friendship University of Russia, Moscow, Russia. He is also Principal Fellow with the School of Philosophical and Historical Studies and senior research fellow with the Australia India Institute (resigned March 2022), both in the University of Melbourne, Australia.

Among his recent academic positions are: Fulbright-Nehru Distinguished Fellow and Visiting Faculty at Ashoka University in Delhi, India (Fall 2019); permanent senior fellow with the Oxford Centre for Hindu Studies, University of Oxford; distinguished teaching and senior research fellow in Indian philosophy and formerly core doctoral faculty at Graduate Theological Union in Berkeley; formerly Chancellor's Scholar, lecturer and visiting professor at the University of California, Berkeley; visiting scholar with the Institute for South Asia Studies, University of California at Berkeley; and honorary professor at the Deakin University. Visiting Scholar Faculty of Philosophy, Ljubljana University (Program in Indian Philosophy & Indology), and Koç University (Istanbul).

A co-founder of the Australian Society for Asian and Comparative Philosophy., he is also co-editor-in-chief of both Sophia (international journal in philosophy and traditions, with Springer, based in University of Melbourne) and Journal of Dharma Studies (Springer), and Editor (with Amy Rayner) of Routledge History of Indian Philosophy (2018). He is also founder and the co-editor-in-chief of the Sophia Studies in Cross-Cultural Philosophy of Traditions and Culture (currently at 30 volumes; with Springer).

== Selected works ==
- Companion to Indian Ethics Women Justice Bioethics and Ecology (with Amy Rayner and 40 authors), Routledge 2024.
- Mind, Body and Self (edited with J L Shaw, Anand Vaidya and M. Hemmingsen), Sophia Series, Springer, 2024.
- Sustainability Interdisciplinary and Interreligious Approaches (co-edited with Rita Sherma, Springer 2021)
- Contemplative Studies and Hinduism (co-edited with Rita Sherma, Routledge 2020)
- Contemplative Studies and Jainism (co-edited with Rita Sherma, and Cogen Bohanec, Routledge 2024)
- Routledge History of Indian Philosophy (2018)
- Sabda Pramana: Word and Knowledge/Testimony in Indian Philosophy (Springer 1988; Delhi 2008)
- Why is there Nothing Rather than Something? (Sophia; 2013)
- The Indian Diaspora The Hindus and Sikhs in Australia (1996; 2015)
- The Self & its Other in Hindu Thought (2005)
- Contemporary Philosophy and J.L. Shaw (ed.) (2006)
- Essays in Indian Philosophy: Traditional and Modern (1995) (with J. Mohanty)
- The Other Revolution: NGO and Feminist Perspectives from South and East Asia (1998) (with R. Sharma).
- Emotions in Indian-Thought System (2015 with Aleksander Wenta)
- "Postcolonial Philosophy of Philosophy" (2009 with Andrew Irvine)
- "J L Shaw and Comparative Philosophy" (with Michael Hemmingsen, 2016)
- "Indian Ethics vol I Classical and Contemporary Changes (with J. Prabhu and Renuka Sharma; 2017, Routledge Paperback)
- "Indian Ethics vol II Gender Justice and Ecology (with Prabhu, Sharma and Amy Rayner) (Springer 2018)
- "Preface to Empathy Theory and Practice in Psychotheraphy by Renuka Sharma" (2014)
- "Globalization, Transnationalism, Gender and Ecological Engagement" (with Amy Rayner, 2012)
- 100+ articles in peer-reviewed journals and book chapters, proceedings.
