= Joseph Koterski =

American Jesuit priest (1953–2021)

Joseph Koterski, S.J. (November 28, 1953 – August 9, 2021) was an American Jesuit priest, philosopher, author, and professor at Fordham University in the Bronx, New York.

== Biography ==
In 1976, Koterski graduated with a H.A.B. degree in Classics from Xavier University in Cincinnati, Ohio. In 1980, he earned a M.A. from Saint Louis University with a thesis titled Aristotle's Ethics and Reflective Equilibrium, and then two years later a Ph.D. from the same school, while there on a Danforth Fellowship. His dissertation, mentored by James Collins, was titled Truth and Freedom in Karl Jasper’s Philosophy of Science.

Immediately, after obtaining his degree in 1982, Koterski taught at the University of St. Thomas in Houston, Texas. At the time, he was also discerning a vocation to the religious life. After two years of teaching, he applied to the Maryland Province of the Society of Jesus. His studies continued and as a Jesuit Koterski earned his Masters of Divinity and License in Sacred Theology from Weston School of Theology in Cambridge, Massachusetts with a thesis titled Natural Law and the Book of Wisdom. From 1986 to 1988, he was assistant professor of philosophy, Loyola College in Baltimore, Maryland.

Koterski was ordained a priest in 1992. Soon afterwards, he was assigned as a professor at Fordham. In the late 1990s he also began teaching philosophical courses at the minor seminary of the Archdiocese of New York. From 1996 to 2001, he was director of the MA program in philosophical resources at Fordham. From 1994, he has served as chaplain for Queens Court Residential College Freshmen. He was a pillar of the University Faculty for Life, serving on the Board of Directors since 1993, Treasurer 1997–2006, and Secretary since 2006. In 2008, Koterski was elected president of the Fellowship of Catholic Scholars.

Koterski died on August 9, 2021, while on a retreat on Enders Island, New London County, Connecticut.

== Publications ==
Koterski was the editor or author of numerous articles and reviews.

Since 1992, he served as the editor of Life and Learning, the peer-review proceedings of the University Faculty for Life. In 1994, he began serving as the editor-in-chief of International Philosophical Quarterly. Since 1999, he was co-editor of the Fordham University Press Series in Moral Philosophy and Moral Theology. In 2016, he began editing the Fellowship of Catholic Scholars Quarterly. He was also an associate editor for the New Catholic Encyclopedia (Gale-Cengage).

=== Books ===
- An Introduction to Medieval Philosophy: Some Basic Concepts (Malden MA: Wiley-Blackwell, 2009).

=== Co-edited books ===
- (with Graham Oppy), Theism and Atheism: Opposing Arguments In Philosophy (Farmington Hills MI: Cengage Gale, 2018).
- (with Ron Begley), Medieval Education (Bronx NY: Fordham University Press, 2005).
- (with John Conley, S.J.), Culture and Creed (Philadelphia PA: St Joseph's University Press, 2004).
- (with David Ruel Foster), The Two Wings of Catholic Thought: Essays on Fides et Ratio (Washington, D.C.: The Catholic University of America Press, 2003).
- (with Raymond J. Langley), Karl Jaspers on Philosophy of History and History of Philosophy (Amherst, NY: Humanity Press, 2003).
- (with John J. Conley, S.J.), Prophecy and Diplomacy: The Moral Teaching of Pope John Paul II (New York: Fordham Univ. Press, 1999).

=== Selected articles ===
- "A Reading Guide to Natural Law Ethics" in Ressourcement Thomism: Essays in Honor of Romanus Cessario, O.P., edited by Matthew Levering and Reinhard Hutter (forthcoming).
- "The Status of Personalism in Catholic Moral Thinking Today" - Dunwoodie Review (forthcoming).
- "Memory and The Tempest" in Tolle lege: Essays on Augustine and Medieval Philosophy in Honor of Roland J. Teske, S.J., edited by David Twetten et al. (forthcoming).
- "Society and the Formation of Free Persons" in Yves R. Simon: The Call of Philosophy (Texts with Commentaries), edited by John W. Carlson (Washington, D.C.: The Catholic University of America Press, forthcoming).
- "Jaspers on Truth and Freedom" in Companion to Karl Jaspers, edited by Gregory J. Walters (Amherst NY: Humanity Press, forthcoming).
- "Aquinas on the Sacrament of Marriage" in Rediscovering Aquinas and the Sacraments, edited by Matthew Levering and Michael Dauphinais (Chicago IL: Hillenbrand Books, 2009), pp. 102–13.
- "Theological Reflections on Natural Family Planning" in Nova et Vetera 6/4 (2008): 765–77.
- "Calderon's La vida es un sueno" in St. Austin Review 8/1 (2008): 15–17.
- "More's Reflections on Complicity with Evil in The History of King Richard III" in Thomas More Studies 2 (2007): 53–62.
- "Non-Negotiable Principles of Christian Politics" in Inside Fordham 29/15 (June 29, 2007): 5.
- "The Four Senses of Scripture" in The Brandsma Review 16/2 (2007): 14–16.
- "The Use of Philosophical Principles in Catholic Social Thought: The Case of Gaudium et Spes" in The Journal of Catholic Legal Studies (St. John's University Law Review) 45/2 (2007): 277–92.
- "The Doctrine of Participation in Aquinas's Commentary on St. John" in Being and Thought in Aquinas, edited by Jeremiah Hackett, William Murnion, and Carl Still (Binghamton NY: Global Academic Publ., 2004), pp. 109–21.
- "Boethius and the Theological Origins of the Concept of Person" in American Catholic Philosophical Quarterly 78/2 (2004): 203–24.
- Thomas More on Conscience" in Thomas More: Spiritual Writings (New York NY: Vintage Press, 2003), pp. xi-xxix.
- "The New IGMR and Mass versus populum" (co-authored with Christopher Cullen, S.J.) in Homiletic and Pastoral Review 101/9 (June 2001): 51–54.
- "Response to Robert P. George: Natural Law, The Constitution, and the Theory and Practice of Judicial Review" in Fordham Law Review 69 (2001): 101–04.
- "How Jefferson Honored Religion in Crisis 19/3 (March 2001): 35.
- "On the Aristotelian Heritage of John of Damascus" in The Failure of Modernism: The Cartesian Legacy and Contemporary Pluralism, edited by Brendan Sweetman (Washington, D.C.: The American Maritain Association and Catholic University of America Press, 1999), pp. 58–71.
- "Jaspers on Realism and Idealism" in Jahrbuch der Österreichischen Karl Jaspers Gesellschaft 11 (1998): 58–69.
- "C. S. Lewis and the Natural Law" in CSL: The Bulletin of the New York C. S. Lewis Society 26/6 #306 (April 1995): 1–7.
- "Certain Essentially Human Aspects of Intelligence," paper and discussion in the Proceedings of the ITEST Workshop on Artificial Intelligence (St. Louis MO: March 1984), pp. 38–43 et passim.
- "A Mystic's Epistemology: Truth and Freedom in the Thought of St. Bernard of Clairvaux" in the Proceedings of the Patristic, Medieval and Renaissance Studies Conference 8 (1983): 47–52.
- "Secularization or Christian Culture?" in The Dawson Newsletter 1/2 (1981): 1–4.
- "St. Augustine on the Moral Law" in Augustinian Studies 11 (1980): 65–77.
- "Aristotle on Signifying Definitions" in The New Scholasticism 54 (1980): 75–86
- "GRACE, The Ignatian Examen"

=== Multimedia ===
The Teaching Company has employed Koterski for several lectures in its Great Courses series, namely:

- Biblical Wisdom Literature
- Ethics of Aristotle
- Natural Law and Human Nature
