= Philosothon =

Philosophical competition for school-aged students

A Philosothon is an annual competition wherein students explore philosophical and ethical issues. Philosothons are held annually in all Australian states, New Zealand, and the United Kingdom.

At a Philosothon, school-aged students are assessed by university-based professional philosophers and receive scores based on rigour and clarity of thought. A central component of a Philosothon is the pedagogical model for teaching Philosophy to young people called Community of inquiry. The event has grown alongside and within the Philosophy for Children movement.The first Australasian Philosothon was held at Cranbrook School, Sydney in 2011 and the first British Philosothon was held in 2012 at King's College, Taunton.

2007 Hale School Philosothon Winning school students with trophy

== History ==
In 2007, Hale School in Perth, Western Australia initiated a project to promote higher-order thinking among secondary school students. The Head of Philosophy and Ethics, Mr. Matthew Wills, created the event to promote student engagement in the study of Philosophy. At the first Philosothon, nine local high school teams, each comprising five students, came together for an evening of philosophical investigation. The word 'Philosothon' was invented in the first few years of the event by Matthew Wills and Leanne Rucks.

== Recent history ==
Following the first Philosothon, the event began being promoted more broadly to other schools around the country and later in the UK. Philosothons now take place annually in each Australian capital city and in regional locations around Australia and New Zealand. Primary school Philosothons have been conducted in various art galleries in some Australian states and in the UK. Philosothons have been established in regional cities throughout Australia and New Zealand. A similar growth has been spearheaded by Academy Conferences in the UK, where various regional hubs are emerging, such as Stowe.

In 2017 The Templeton Religion Trust awarded $281,656 AUD to the Philosothon project in order to "grow existing Philosothons and support the establishment of new ones, particularly in remote schools and at schools catering for students from low socio-economic backgrounds" in Australasia. Similar funding was awarded to the Ian Ramsey Centre at Oxford University to expand the UK Philosothon initiative in 2019. The Philosothons also take place around the UK with introductory presentations given to teachers at Academy Conferences multiple times each year. More recently, the University of Western Australia was awarded a grant from the Templeton Religion Trust to focus on developing Philosothons in remote and regional parts of Australia and New Zealand. Matthew Wills was appointed the Project Manager. As part of the expansion of Philosothons in the UK, there have been introductory presentations to teachers explaining the concept of Philosothons at more than 15 Academy Conferences events, as well as ISRSA and NATRE conferences. These presentations have been accompanied by associated outreach work, including the development of a website and distribution of more than 500 flash drives with introductory and administrative material—all funded by the Templeton Religion Trust.

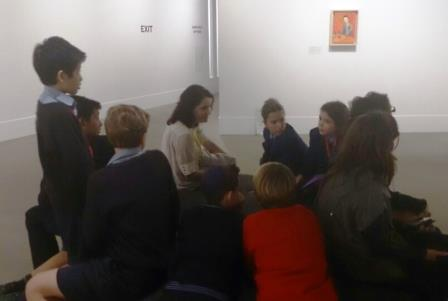
A Junior School Philosothon at the Art Gallery of Western Australia

In 2020, the Australasian Association of Philosophy ran the first online Philosothon. With the arrival of the COVID-19 and travel restrictions, the 2020 Australasian Philosothon was held online with twenty-one Australian and New Zealand schools participating.

== Rationale and process ==
The rationale for the Philosothon is based on empirical evidence that teaching children reasoning skills early in life greatly improves other cognitive and academic skills and greatly assists learning in general. Students are given questions and some stimulus reading materials in advance.

Examples of questions from recent Philosothons include:

- Is it moral to fake kindness? (Moral Philosophy)
- Do men and woman have different natures? (Metaphysical)
- Do you have free will? (Metaphysical)
- Should you always listen to the opinions of others? (Epistemology)
- How free should speech be? (Political Philosophy)

Due to COVID restrictions, online Philosothons have been increasing in popularity. Whether online or face-to-face, students, teachers and parents gather on a particular evening each year for the event. The students participate in a series of four philosophical Community of inquiry discussions, which are facilitated by teachers, philosophy students from the local universities, or someone with a PhD. While participating in this process, students are scored by philosophy lecturers, who are often from local universities. The scores are then collated, ranked, and awards are given to students at each age-level. Additionally, the most promising male and female philosopher receive encouragement awards. A trophy is awarded to the winning school.

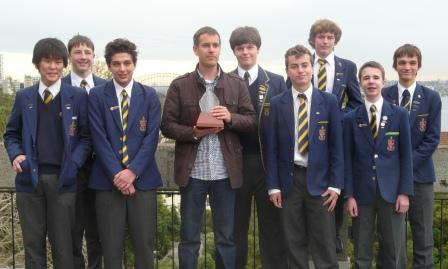
Winners of the 2011 Australasian Philosothon Christ Church Grammar School

== Australasian Philosothon ==
In July 2011, the first National Philosothon was held at Cranbrook School. Each Australian state sent three teams (those schools that won in their regional Philosothon), so twelve schools in total arrived in Sydney to participate in the inaugural event. Each year the Australasian Philosothon is run in a different region in Australasia. In 2019, the ninth Australasian Philosothon was held at Radford College in Canberra. In 2020, the Australasian Philosothon was hosted online for the first time by the Australasian Association of Philosophy.

== United Kingdom ==
Philosothons have been running in the UK since 2013. Revd. Mark Smith & Julie Arliss from the Philosophy of Religion and Ethics Department at King's College, Taunton, UK, spearheaded the Philosothon movement in the United Kingdom in collaboration with Dr Michael Lacewing from Heythrop College and Lizzy Lewis from Sapere. Wells Cathedral College won the first event. More recently, Philosothons have spread throughout the UK by being promoted at Academy Conferences events through the UK hub at King's College, Taunton—with more than 375 attendees in the year 2019–2020 (more events were postponed due to COVID-19). Primary School Philosothons have also been hosted by the Philosophy Foundation. Other Philosothons have been held around the UK.

== Primary and middle school Philosothons ==
In 2012, the inaugural Primary School Philosothon was held at the National Gallery of Victoria (NGV). The following year, the first WA Primary school Philosothon was hosted by John XXIII College at the Art Gallery of WA. Since then, Annual Primary School Philosothons have been conducted in Victoria, WA and the UK.
