= Australasian Journal of Philosophy =

- Discipline: Philosophy
- Language: English
- Edited by: Antony Eagle

Publication details
- Former names: The Australasian Journal of Psychology and Philosophy
- History: 1923–present
- Publisher: Routledge on behalf of the Australasian Association of Philosophy
- Frequency: Quarterly

Standard abbreviations
- ISO 4: Australas. J. Philos.

Indexing
- ISSN: 0004-8402 (print); 1471-6828 (web)
- LCCN: 36002661
- OCLC no.: 02923644

Links
- Journal homepage; Journal page at publisher's website

The Australasian Journal of Philosophy is a quarterly peer-reviewed academic journal of philosophy and "one of the oldest English-language philosophy journals in the world". It was established in 1923 as The Australasian Journal of Psychology and Philosophy, obtaining its current title in 1947.

It is published by Routledge on behalf of the Australasian Association of Philosophy. In 2007, it was rated "A" in the European Reference Index in the Humanities. It is abstracted and indexed by the Arts and Humanities Citation Index, Historical Abstracts, Scopus, Philosopher's Index, ProQuest databases, and Current Contents/Arts & Humanities.

== History ==
Continuously published since its foundation in 1923 – with all members of the Australasian Association of Psychology and Philosophy receiving copies of the journal free of charge as a perquisite of their membership (it was also available to non-members at a cost of three shillings an issue, or ten shillings a year) – it was published quarterly (in March, June, September and December) from 1923 until 1937, and triannually from 1938 to 1978, except for the period from 1943 to 1947, when limited war-time supplies restricted the publication to only two issues a year.

It resumed quarterly publication in 1979. Originally published by the Australasian Association of Psychology and Philosophy (later, Australasian Association of Philosophy) itself, it switched to Oxford University Press in 1998. Since 2005, the journal has been published by Routledge.

== Editors-in-chief ==
The following persons have been editor-in-chief:

- 1923–1926: Francis Anderson (University of Sydney)

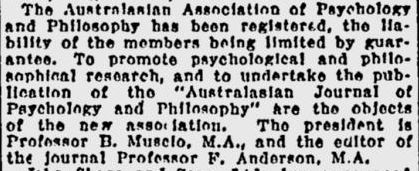
Sydney Morning Herald, Tuesday, 14 October 1924.

- 1927–1934: H. Tasman Lovell (University of Sydney)
- 1935 –1946: John Anderson (University of Sydney)
- 1947 –1949: John Passmore (University of Sydney)
- 1950–1967: A.K. Stout (University of Sydney)
- 1968–1972 Graham Nerlich (University of Sydney)
- 1973–1977: Robert Brown (Australian National University)
- 1978–1989: Brian Ellis (La Trobe University)
- 1990–1997: Robert Young (La Trobe University)
- 1998–2001: Fred D'Agostino (University of New England), Peter Forrest (University of New England), Gerry Gaus (Queensland University of Technology)
- 2002–2007: Maurice Goldsmith (Victoria University of Wellington)
- December 2007 – December 2013: Stewart Candlish (University of Western Australia)
- December 2013 – March 2022: Stephen Hetherington (University of New South Wales)
- March 2022 – present: Antony Eagle (University of Adelaide)

== Notable articles ==
To celebrate the ninetieth volume of the journal, a "virtual special issue" was released in 2012, containing links to ten articles from past issues selected by then editor-in-chief Stewart Candlish. According to the Web of Science, the following three articles have been cited most frequently (>150 times):

- Lewis, David (1983). "New work for a theory of universals". Australasian Journal of Philosophy. 61 (4): 343–377. doi:10.1080/00048408312341131.
- Lewis, David (1996). "Elusive knowledge". Australasian Journal of Philosophy. 74 (4): 549–567. doi:10.1080/00048409612347521.
- Lewis, David (1984). "Putnam's paradox". Australasian Journal of Philosophy. 62 (3): 221–236. doi:10.1080/00048408412340013.

The most published authors were J.J.C. Smart, David Lewis and John Mackie, reflecting the generally analytic focus that the Journal has maintained since its early idealist days.

== Best Paper Award ==
Since 2007, an annual prize of A$1,000 is awarded for the best paper published in the journal in the previous year.
