= Frank Cameron Jackson =

Australian philosopher

Frank Cameron Jackson AO FASSA FAHA FBA
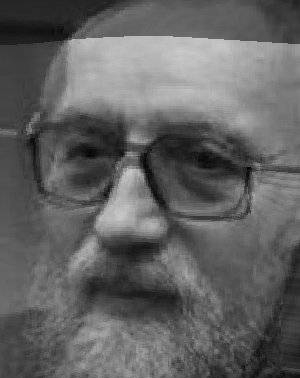
- Born: 31 August 1943 (age 83); Melbourne, Victoria, Australia

Education
- Education: University of Melbourne (BA); La Trobe University (PhD)
- Doctoral advisor: Brian Ellis

Philosophical work
- Era: Contemporary philosophy
- Region: Western philosophy
- School: Analytic
- Institutions: Australian National University; Princeton University
- Main interests: Philosophy of mind, epistemology, metaphysics, meta-ethics
- Notable ideas: Mary's room

Frank Cameron Jackson (born 31 August 1943) is an Australian analytic philosopher and Emeritus Professor in the School of Philosophy (Research School of Social Sciences) at Australian National University (ANU) where he had spent most of the latter part of his career. His primary research interests include epistemology, metaphysics, meta-ethics and the philosophy of mind. In the latter field he is best known for the "Mary's room" knowledge argument, a thought experiment that is one of the most discussed challenges to physicalism.

== Biography ==
Frank Cameron Jackson was born on 31 August 1943 in Melbourne, Australia. His parents were both philosophers. His mother Ann E. Jackson, who rose to the rank of senior tutor, taught philosophy at the University of Melbourne from 1961 to 1984. His atheistic father Allan Cameron Jackson (1911–1990) had been a student of Ludwig Wittgenstein (having gone to Cambridge in 1946 for Ph.D. studies). F. C. Jackson, in interview with Graham Oppy, reports of his parents that; they were both "philosophers in the Old School, by which I mean the Wittgensteinian School. Philosophy was part of your life."

Despite his self-reported enjoyment of the philosophical conversation of his household it was with view to becoming a mathematician that Jackson went to the University of Melbourne to study maths and science. And it was only in his final year of those studies that he chose to also take some philosophy which he found he better enjoyed and proved significantly more able. He passed his B.Sc. but went on to achieve Honours in a B.A. whose main subject was philosophy. During his time at Melbourne he was a resident at Trinity College, a Clarke Scholar, and a member of the 2nd XVIII football team.

Upon graduation from his second degree, Jackson taught at the University of Adelaide for a year in 1967 and then went to La Trobe University for a lectureship appointment. Whilst there, Jackson published his first book (which was also his doctoral thesis) "Perception: A Representative Theory" (1977). The following year he succeeded his father to the chair of Philosophy at Monash University.

In 1986, he joined ANU as Professor of Philosophy and Head of the Philosophy Program, within the Research School of Social Sciences. At ANU, he served as Director of the Institute of Advanced Studies (1998–2001), Deputy Vice-Chancellor – Research (2001), and Director of the Research School of Social Sciences (2004–7). Jackson was appointed as Distinguished Professor at ANU in 2003; he became an Emeritus Professor upon his retirement in 2014. Latterly (2007–14) he had also been a regular visiting professor of philosophy at Princeton University.

Jackson was awarded the Order of Australia in 2006 for service to philosophy and social sciences as an academic, administrator, and researcher. Jackson delivered the John Locke Lectures at the University of Oxford in 1995. Notably, his father had also delivered the 1957–8 lectures, making them the first father–son pair to have done so.

== Philosophical work ==
Jackson's philosophical research is broad, but focuses primarily on the areas of philosophy of mind, epistemology, metaphysics, and meta-ethics.

In philosophy of mind, Jackson is known especially for the knowledge argument against physicalism—the view that the universe is entirely physical (i.e., the kinds of entities postulated in physics). Jackson motivates the knowledge argument by a famous thought experiment known as Mary's room. In a much cited passage he phrases the thought experiment as follows:

Mary is a brilliant scientist who is, for whatever reason, forced to investigate the world from a black and white room via a black and white television monitor. She specializes in the neurophysiology of vision and acquires, let us suppose, all the physical information there is to obtain about what goes on when we see ripe tomatoes, or the sky, and use terms like 'red', 'blue', and so on. She discovers, for example, just which wavelength combinations from the sky stimulate the retina, and exactly how this produces via the central nervous system the contraction of the vocal cords and expulsion of air from the lungs that results in the uttering of the sentence 'The sky is blue'. (…) What will happen when Mary is released from her black and white room or is given a color television monitor? Will she learn anything or not? It seems just obvious that she will learn something about the world and our visual experience of it. But then is it inescapable that her previous knowledge was incomplete. But she had all the physical information. Ergo there is more to have than that, and Physicalism is false.

— Jackson, Frank, “Epiphenomenal Qualia.” (1982)

Jackson's thought experiment features in the 1996 Channel 4 documentary "Brainspotting" and David Lodge's novel Thinks... (2001).

Jackson used the knowledge argument, as well as other arguments, to establish a sort of dualism, according to which certain mental states, especially qualitative ones, are non-physical. The view that Jackson urged was a modest version of epiphenomenalism—the view that certain mental states are non-physical and, although caused to come into existence by physical events, do not then cause any changes in the physical world.

However, Jackson later rejected the knowledge argument, as well as other arguments against physicalism:

Most contemporary philosophers given a choice between going with science and going with intuitions, go with science. Although I once dissented from the majority, I have capitulated and now see the interesting issue as being where the arguments from the intuitions against physicalism—the arguments that seem so compelling—go wrong.

— Jackson, Frank, "Mind and Illusion" (2003)

Jackson argues that the intuition-driven arguments against physicalism (such as the knowledge argument and the zombie argument) are ultimately misleading.

Jackson is also known for his defence of the centrality of conceptual analysis to philosophy; his approach, set out in his Locke Lectures and published as his 1998 book, is often referred to as the Canberra Plan.

== Honours ==
Jackson was elected Fellow of the Australian Academy of the Humanities (FAHA) in 1981 and of the Academy of the Social Sciences in Australia (FASSA) in 1998.

He was awarded the Centenary Medal in 2001 and appointed an Officer of the Order of Australia (AO) in 2006.

In 2003 he was appointed as Distinguished Professor at the Australian National University and Emeritus Professor in 2014. In November 2018 Jackson received the Peter Baume Award, which recognises substantial and significant achievement and merit.

== Publications ==
=== Books ===
- Perception: A Representative Theory (1977, CUP)
- Conditionals (1987, Basil Blackwell)
- (with David Braddon-Mitchell) Philosophy of Mind and Cognition: An Introduction (1996, Basil Blackwell), 2nd ed. (2007)
- From Metaphysics to Ethics: A Defence of Conceptual Analysis (1998, OUP) doi:10.1093/0198250614.001.0001
- Mind, Method and Conditionals: Selected Essays (1998, Routledge)
- (with Philip Pettit & Michael Smith) Mind, Morality, and Explanations: Selected Collaborations (2004, OUP)
- Language, Names and Information (2010, Wiley-Blackwell)

=== Edited books ===
- Conditionals (1991, OUP)
- (with Michael Smith) The Oxford Handbook of Contemporary Philosophy (2005, OUP)

=== Selected articles ===
- (1975) 'Grue' Journal of Philosophy, vol. 72, no. 5, pp. 113–131.
- (1979) 'On Assertion and Indicative Conditionals' The Philosophical Review, vol. 88, no. 4, pp. 565–589.
- (1980) 'Ontological Commitment and Paraphrase' Philosophy, vol. 55, no. 213, pp. 303–315.
- (1981) 'Conditionals and Possibilia' Proceedings of the Aristotelian Society, vol. 81, pp. 125–137.
- (1982) 'Epiphenomenal Qualia' The Philosophical Quarterly, vol. 32, no. 27, pp. 127–136.
- (1982) 'Functionalism and Type-Type Identity Theories' Philosophical Studies, vol. 42, no. 2, pp. 209–225. (with Robert Pargetter & Elizabeth W. Prior)
- (1984) 'Weakness of Will' Mind, vol. 93, no. 369, pp. 1–18.
- (1984) 'Petitio and the Purpose of Arguing' Pacific Philosophical Quarterly, vol. 65, no. 1, pp. 26–36.
- (1985) 'On the Semantics and Logic of Obligation' Mind, vol. 94, no. 374, pp. 177–196.
- (1986) 'Oughts, Options, and Actualism' The Philosophical Review, vol. 95, no. 2, 233–255. (with Robert Pargetter)
- (1986) 'What Mary Didn't Know' The Journal of Philosophy, vol. 83, no. 5, pp. 291–295.
- (1988) 'Functionalism and Broad Content' Mind, vol. 97, no. 387, pp. 381–400. (with Philip Pettit)
- (1990) 'Classifying Conditionals' Analysis, vol. 50, no. 2, pp. 134–147.
- (1990) 'In Defence of Folk Psychology' Philosophical Studies, vol. 59, no. 1, pp. 31–54. (with Philip Pettit)
- (1991) 'Decision-Theoretic Consequentialism and the Nearest and Dearest Objection' Ethics, vol. 101, no. 3, pp. 461–482.
- (1994) 'Minimalism and Truth Aptness' Mind, vol. 103, no. 411, pp. 287–302. (with Graham Oppy & Michael Smith)
- (1996) 'The Primary Quality View of Color' Philosophical Perspectives, vol. 10, pp. 199–219.
- (1996) 'Mental Causation' Mind, vol. 105, no. 419, pp. 377–413.
- (1998) 'A Problem for Expressivism' Analysis, vol. 58, no. 4, pp. 239–251. (with Philip Pettit)
- (1999) 'The Divide and Conquer Path to Analytical Functionalism' Philosophical Topics, vol. 26, no. 1/2, pp. 71–88. (with David Braddon-Mitchell)
- (2001) 'Conceptual Analysis and Reductive Explanation' The Philosophical Review, vol. 110, no. 3, pp. 315–360. (with David J. Chalmers)
- (2002) 'Response-Dependence without Tears' Philosophical Issues, vol. 12, pp. 97–117. (with Philip Pettit)
- (2003a) 'Cognitivism, A Priori Deduction, and Moore' Ethics, vol. 113, no. 3, pp. 557–575.
- (2003b) 'Mind and Illusion' in Minds and Persons, ed. Anthony O'Hear, Cambridge University Press, pp. 251–272.
- (2005) 'What Are Cognitivists Doing When They Do Normative Ethics?' Philosophical Issues, vol. 15, pp. 94–106.
- (2006) 'Absolutist Moral Theories and Uncertainty' The Journal of Philosophy, vol. 103, no. 6, pp. 267–283. (with Michael Smith)
- (2007) 'Freedom from Fear' Philosophy & Public Affairs, vol. 35, no. 3, pp. 249–265. (with Robert E. Goodin)
- (2010) 'The Autonomy of Mind' Philosophical Issues, vol. 20, pp. 170–184.
- (2012) 'Leibniz's Law and the Philosophy of Mind' Proceedings of the Aristotelian Society, vol. 112, pp. 269–283.
