= Other Minds: The Octopus, the Sea, and the Deep Origins of Consciousness =

2016 book by Peter Godfrey-Smith

- Cover illustration of Octopus vulgaris by Ernst Haeckel, Kunstformen der Natur, 1904
- Author: Peter Godfrey-Smith
- Subject: Evolution of mind
- Genre: Popular science
- Publisher: William Collins
- Publication date: 2016

Other Minds is a 2016 book by the Australian philosopher Peter Godfrey-Smith on the evolution and nature of consciousness. It compares the situation in cephalopods, especially octopuses and cuttlefish, with that in mammals and birds. Complex active bodies that enable and perhaps require a measure of intelligence have evolved three times, in arthropods, cephalopods, and vertebrates. The book reflects on the nature of cephalopod intelligence in particular, constrained by their short lifespan, and embodied in large part in their partly autonomous arms, which contain more nerve cells than their brains.

The book has been praised by reviewers, who have found it delightfully written, undogmatic but incisive in its analysis, and its account of intelligence as a subjective embodied experience elegantly told. The author's octopus subjects come across as "uncannily personable without being at all human".

== Book ==
=== Context ===
Peter Godfrey-Smith is an Australian philosopher of science, specialising in the philosophy of mind and its relationship with the philosophy of biology. He is an experienced diver.

=== Publication ===
Other Minds was published by Farrar, Straus, and Giroux in the US in 2016 and subsequently in the UK by William Collins, in 2017. It is illustrated with 17 colour plates and monochrome photographs and diagrams in the text. All the photographs of octopuses and cuttlefish were taken underwater by Godfrey-Smith.

=== Content ===
Origins of intelligence

- Animals 760 mya
  - Sponges
  - Neurons?
    - Cnidaria (jellyfish, corals)
    - Bilateria c. 600 mya
      - **Vertebrates** (humans, fish)
      - - **Arthropods** (ants, lobsters)
        - **Molluscs** (snails, cephalopods)

Godfrey-Smith shows octopus and human lineages with a phylogenetic tree. The three lineages with "complex active bodies" are bolded. Many other lineages are not shown.

Godfrey-Smith's premise in the book is the fact that intelligence has evolved separately in two groups of animals: in cephalopods like octopuses and cuttlefish, and in vertebrates like birds and humans. He notes that studying cephalopods is "probably the closest we will come to meeting an intelligent alien" and that "the minds of cephalopods are the most other of all".

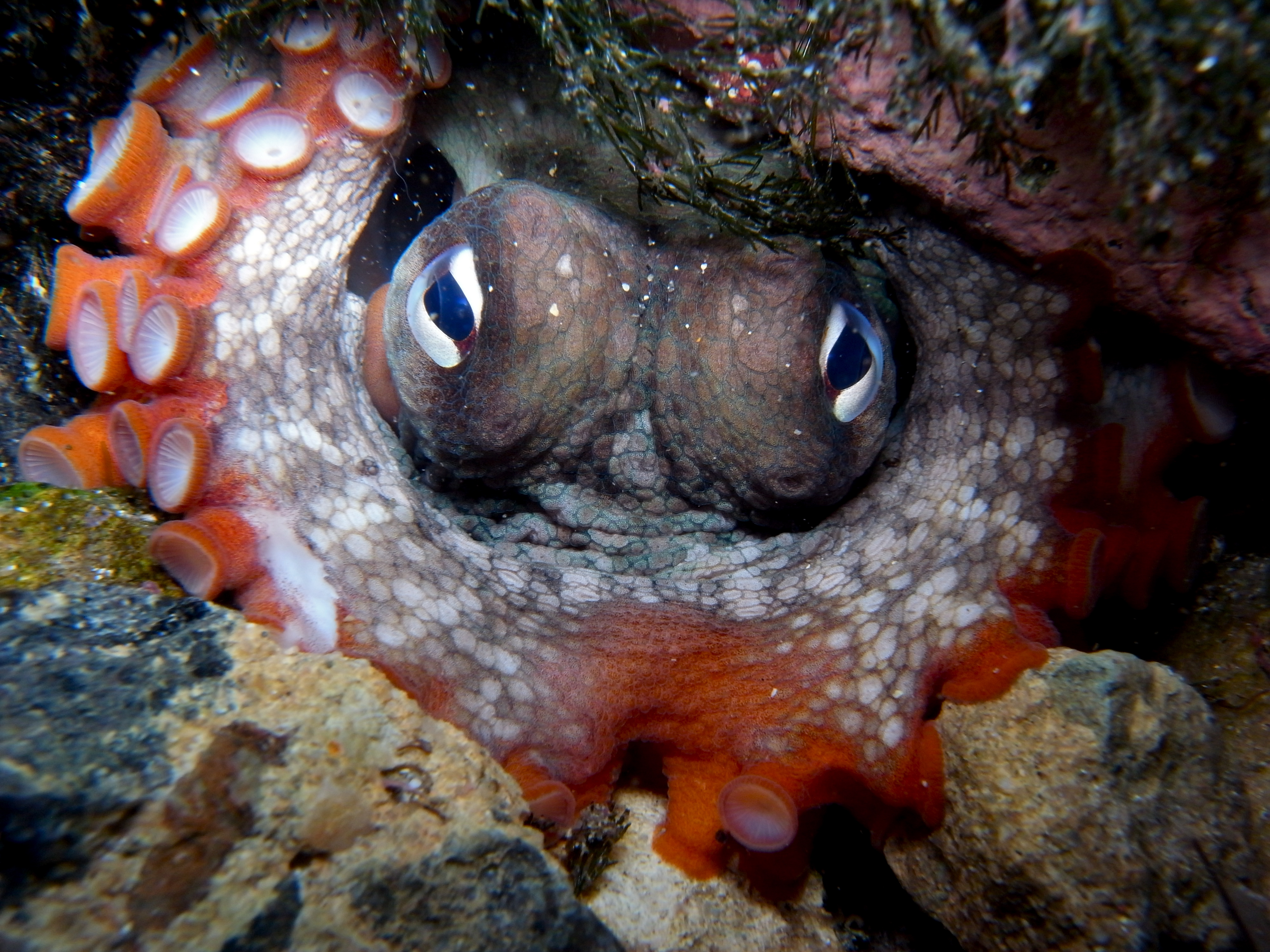
Octopus tetricus, the species found at "Octopolis"

He describes many encounters with octopuses during dives in the shallow waters off Australia, especially in a favoured place that he names "Octopolis", where many of the animals gather. He notes that octopuses are inquisitive, observant, even friendly, but the architecture of their nervous systems is entirely different from the vertebrate plan. The octopus's intelligence is distributed throughout its body: there are almost twice as many nerve cells in their eight muscular arms as in their brain.

Intelligence is predicated, Godfrey-Smith argues, upon the "complex active bodies". Three groups of bilaterian animals with that kind of body plan evolved in the Cambrian period, some 500 million years ago: the arthropods (such as crabs and insects), the vertebrates, and within the molluscs, the cephalopods.

Godfrey-Smith disagrees with an old philosophical idea that consciousness suddenly emerged from unthinking matter. According to him, it is an active relationship with the world, built up in small steps with separate capabilities for perceiving the world, taking action with muscles, and remembering the simplest of events. In Godfrey-Smith's view, such capabilities are present in some degree even in bacteria, which detect chemicals in their environment, and in insects such as bees, which recall the locations of food sources. As for feeling, both crabs and octopuses protect a part of their body that is injured; they evidently feel pain and are sentient to this extent. Cephalopods like the octopus or giant squid represent "an independent experiment in the evolution of large brains and complex behaviour" predicated on the same neural systems as our closer mammalian relatives. Neither language nor a worldview is needed for a measure of intelligence in these "other minds" that share planet Earth.

== Reception ==
Carl Safina, in The New York Times, called Godfrey-Smith "a rare philosopher", both knowledgeable and curious, who good-naturedly explores the world for insights, "never dogmatic, yet startlingly incisive".

Philip Hoare, in The Guardian, quoted Samuel Taylor Coleridge's couplet "Yea, slimy things did crawl with legs / Upon the slimy sea" to evoke the "eldritch other[ness]" of octopus intelligence, "with its more-than-the usual complement of limbs, bulbous eyes, seeking suckers and keratinous beaks voraciously devouring anything in its slippery path". In his opinion, the book "entirely overturns" such preconceptions, with what Godfrey-Smith calls "an independent experiment in the evolution of large brains and complex behaviour" forming a "fascinating case study". In Hoare's view, Godfrey-Smith's empathy with the animals comes from his personal observation, scuba diving in the Pacific Ocean near his university in Sydney. He concludes that "perhaps these animals, so incredibly sensate, learning from each other's behaviour, shifting in shape and colour, are more social than we ever suspected".

Olivia Judson, in The Atlantic, having read Jacques-Yves Cousteau's 1973 Octopus and Squid: The Soft Intelligence, noted that Godfrey-Smith follows the neuroscientist Stanislas Dehaene in suggesting that "there's a particular style of processing—one that we use to deal especially with time, sequences, and novelty—that brings with it conscious awareness, while a lot of other quite complex activities do not". She argued that the ability of octopuses to learn new skills, of the kind that may demand consciousness, indicates the possibility of "an awareness that in some ways resembles our own".

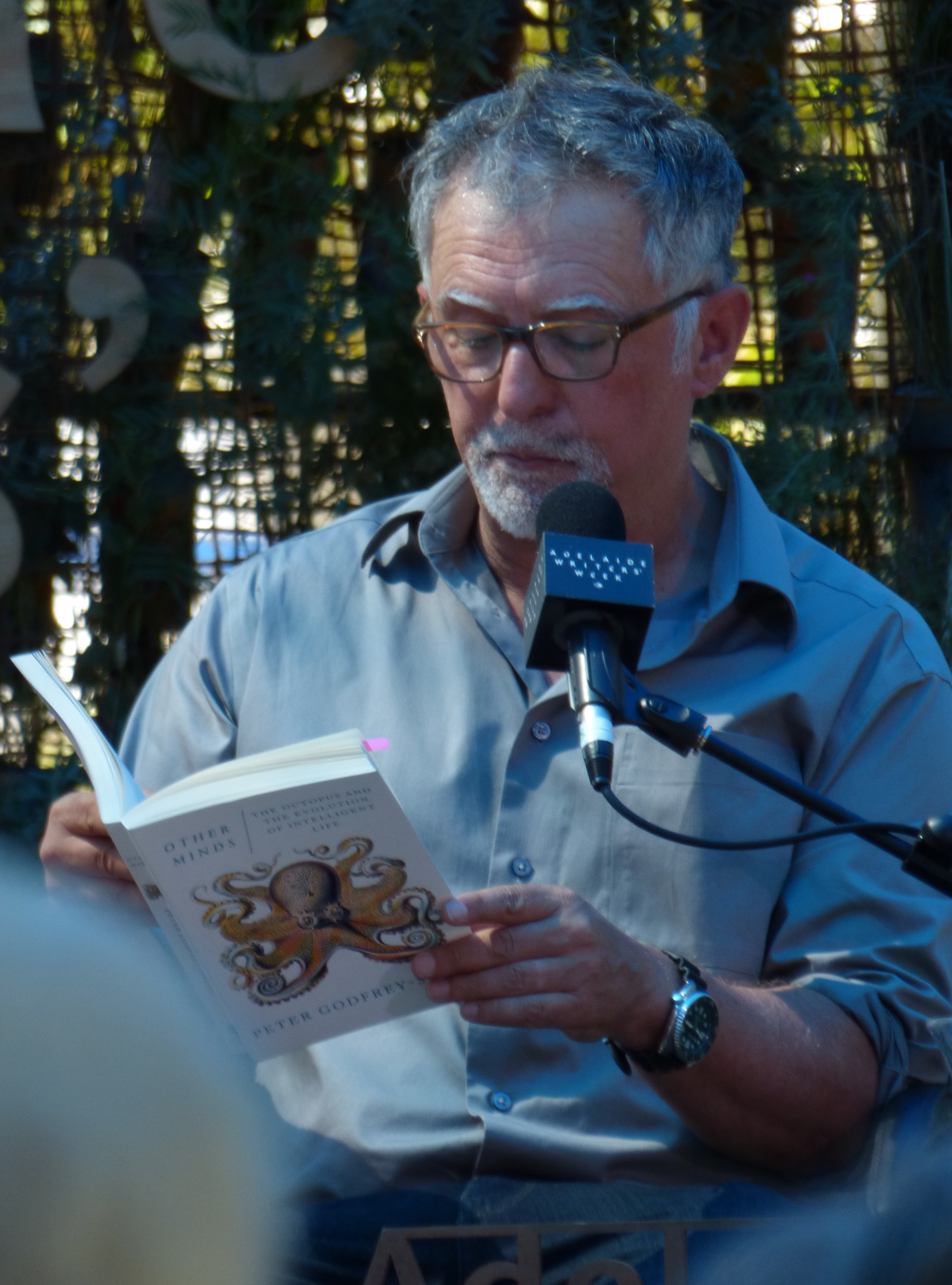
Peter Godfrey-Smith reads from Other Minds, 2018

The biologist Meehan Crist, in The Los Angeles Times, called the book an "elegantly materialist telling", describing cephalopod intelligence as "subjective experience ... deeply embodied in physical form". Since most of the animals' neurons are in their partly-autonomous arms, "'for an octopus, its arms are partly self – they can be directed and used to manipulate things. But from the central brain's perspective they are partly non-self too, partly agents of their own. This is as alien a mind as we could hope to encounter". Crist noted that Godfrey-Smith reflects on the short (1–2 years) lifespan of octopuses. He wonders, in what Crist called "a precipitous existential abyss", why they have such a large nervous system, so costly to build and to run, to learn about the world, when they have almost no time to use the knowledge.

The ecologist Marlene Zuk, in the Los Angeles Review of Books, called Godfrey-Smith "something of an Oliver Sacks of cephalopods" and his subjects "uncannily personable without being at all human". She noted that he meets two obstacles to seeing cephalopods as "rubbery versions of people": they are barely social, interacting mainly to mate; and they have such short lifespans that experience can never become very well-developed. She remarked that sexual selection is not covered, though given how important it has been to humans (she speculated that human brains may have grown under the influence of "selection for mate attraction"), "it is tempting to wonder how it has influenced the octopus".

The neuroscientist Steven Rose, in the Times Higher Education Supplement, called Other Minds "a delightfully written book and a model of engaged science writing". He wrote that Godfrey-Smith handles both biology and philosophy "profoundly but without ever talking down to his audience".

Drake Baer, in New York Magazine, compared octopuses to philosophers: "They are both given to exploring their worlds, they both have a reputation for peculiarity, they both handle multiple subjects with ease". Octopus eyes look and work much like those of vertebrates; but there, Baer remarked, the similarities end. Cephalopods are "immensely foreign", with "a distributed sense of self" and a "lived reality" quite unlike human consciousness, a feature that, he noted, Godfrey-Smith calls "the most difficult aspect of octopus experience to imagine".

The filmmaker Jasper Sharp, in Interalia Magazine, wrote that once in Seoul, he ate san-nakji, freshly butchered raw octopus, "its severed tentacles still twitching". He noted that Godfrey-Smith's suggestion that cephalopods possess both intelligence, with a nervous system of some 500 million neurons, and perhaps consciousness "makes the recollection all the more disturbing". Sharp marveled at the fact, explained by Godfrey-Smith, that despite their shimmering colour displays, cephalopods lack colour receptors in their eyes: they cannot see their own patterns and cannot therefore reflect on their own visual communications as humans reflect on their own speech; unless, indeed, the photoreceptors in their skin enable them to do this. He wrote that Godfrey-Smith "arrives at no fixed conclusion as to whether these strange creatures actually possess a form of consciousness, nor what this word actually means in relation to non-human species, but if the book provokes more questions than it answers, this is in no way a criticism".

== Sources ==
- Godfrey-Smith, Peter (2018). Other Minds: The Octopus, the Sea, and the Deep Origins of Consciousness. William Collins. ISBN 978-0-00-822629-9.
