= Sophia (journal) =

Sophia, International Journal of Philosophy and Traditions
- Discipline: Philosophy, humanities
- Language: English
- Edited by: Purushottama Bilimoria, Patrick Hutchings, Saranindra Tagore

Publication details
- History: 1962–present
- Publisher: Springer Science+Business Media on behalf of University of Melbourne Dept. of Philosophy (Australia)
- Frequency: Quarterly
- Open access: Hybrid
- Impact factor: 0.3 (2022)

Standard abbreviations
- ISO 4: Sophia

Indexing
- ISSN: 0038-1527 (print); 1873-930X (web)
- LCCN: 76647446
- OCLC no.: 2577658

Links
- Journal homepage; Online archive

Sophia, International Journal of Philosophy and Traditions is a quarterly peer-reviewed academic journal covering philosophy, metaphysics, religion and ethics. It was established in 1962 by Max Charlesworth and Graeme de Graaf. Charlesworth served as co-editor from 1962 to 1990. The current editors-in-chief are Purushottama Bilimoria (University of Melbourne), Patrick Hutchings (University of Melbourne), and Saranindranath Tagore (National University of Singapore).

From 2001, the journal was published by Ashgate Publishing in collaboration with the Australasian Society for Philosophy of Religion and Theology, Australasian Association of Philosophy, Australasian Society for Asian and Comparative Philosophy, the University of Melbourne, and Deakin University. The journal has since moved to Springer Science+Business Media.
