= Graham Nerlich =

Australian philosopher 1929-

- Born: 23 November 1929
- Died: 31 March 2022 (aged 92)
- Known for: Philosophy of space, time, and spacetime
- Spouse: Margaret Rawlinson

Academic background
- Thesis: Personal Identity
- Doctoral advisor: J. L. Austin

Academic work
- Institutions: University of Adelaide

Graham Nerlich (23 November 1929 – 31 March 2022) was an Australian philosopher. He was an Emeritus Professor of Philosophy at the University of Adelaide, and his expertise was in the areas of philosophy; existence of God; meaning of life; mind and body; ethics; and philosophy of science.

Graham Nerlich was a Fellow of the Australian Academy of the Humanities Nerlich also served on the council of the International union of history and philosophy of science division of logic, methodology and philosophy of science (DLMPS) from 1987 to 1991.

== Life and career ==
Nerlich graduated Bachelor of Arts with joint honours in Philosophy and English Literature in 1954 and a Master of Arts in 1955, both at University of Adelaide. Then B. Phil, University of Oxford, 1956–1958 with a thesis on Personal Identity, with J. L. Austin, as supervisor and friend. He was Lecturer University of Leicester, England, 1958–1961; University of Sydney, Senior Lecturer 1962–1968; Associate Professor, 1968–1972; Professor, 1972–1973; University of Adelaide, Hughes Professor of Philosophy, 1974–1994; Emeritus Professor 1995.

He was Principal Editor of the Australasian Journal of Philosophy, 1968–1972, and appointed Founder of the Minkowski Institute, 2013.

He was the invited speaker at the International union of history and philosophy of science division of logic, methodology and philosophy of science (IUHPS/DLMPS) Australian delegation at the General Assemblies in Moscow (1987), and Uppsala (1991).

=== Other activities ===
First convenor University of Adelaide's Committee on Ethics, of experimentation on humans, Member for the University of Adelaide of committees for the ethics of experiments on animals, and for the Institute of Medical and Veterinary Science South Australia, and SA Pathology, a couple of decades of each till 2017.

==== Thespian activities ====
Graham was a keen actor, mainly in amateur theatre; Theatre Guild, and Independent Theatre, where he met Margaret Rawlinson, the stage manager and married her. Professional appearances with South Australian State Theatre Co, a couple of small television and film appearances and narrations. Particularly interested in Shakespearean parts – played Ferdinand in Tempest, and later, same play, as Prospero, also Shylock, King Lear and Polonius. He also appeared in several modern plays e.g. Jumpers by Tom Stoppard and Harold Pinter's The Birthday Party.

==== Humanist ====
Nerlich never had a religious faith, and was opposed to religions generally as they are liable to promote commandment ethics and as influential but misleading falsehoods and dogmas; he wrote on this theme the article on 'Popular arguments for the existence of God' in the 1967 Encyclopedia of Philosophy. He was patron of the South Australian Humanist Society (now defunct), and of Voluntary Assisted Dying South Australia, which helped to change the relevant South Australian law on this in 2021.

==== Move to University of Adelaide ====
At Sydney University, Nerlich as head of the Philosophy Department had difficulty in containing the "Sydney philosophy disturbances", in which political differences between left and right created heated conflict over proposed new courses in Marxism-Leninism and over democratisation.

When J. J. C. Smart left Adelaide University in 1972, Nerlich moved to Adelaide to take the chair. 1974 saw the beginning of significant changes in administrative style at Adelaide University. Headship of the Department was no longer tied to occupancy of the Chair. It became an elected position independent of academic rank. Nerlich was elected immediately and quickly moved to allow student representation at staff meetings, among other democratic measures. These changes have persisted, and were instituted not only in Philosophy but also in the University generally. Nerlich’s research and publication in his two decades in the Hughes Chair was divided mainly between studies in the ontology of space, time and space-time, and ethics. In the former and larger output he defended realism toward space-time and especially a unique role for it in ontology as providing geometrical, non-causal explanation in General Relativity. Geometric non-causal explanation was also argued to figure in the explanation of incongruent counterparts and the failure of similarity geometry in non-Euclidean space. Nerlich's interest in the philosophy of physics had been stimulated earlier by Smart, and both have enjoyed good relations with the physics departments.

== Publications ==
=== Books ===
- 2009, The Shape of Space. This is a revised and updated edition of Graham Nerlich's classic book (1976). It develops a metaphysical account of space that treats it as a real and concrete entity, showing that shape plays a key explanatory role in space and spacetime theories. James Franklin agrees, 'It is hard to believe the question makes sense for something that does not really exist.'
- 1990, Values and Valuing: Speculations on the Ethical Life of Persons. Nerlich concludes that valuing will be good only if it results in objective values that are authentic to the individual's nature and surrounding culture.
- 1994, What Spacetime Explains: Metaphysical Essays,
- 2013, Einstein's Genie Spacetime out of the Bottle,
- 2014, Never Mind about the Bourgeoisie: The Correspondence Between Iris Murdoch and Brian Medlin 1976-1995,

=== Articles ===
- Nerlich, Graham (1973). "Hands, Knees, and Absolute Space". The Journal of Philosophy. 70 (12): 337–351. doi:10.2307/2024929. JSTOR 2024929.
- Nerlich, Graham; Mortensen, Chris (1978). "Physical Topology". Journal of Philosophical Logic. 7 (1): 209–223. JSTOR 30226174.
- Nerlich, Graham (1979). "How to Make Things Have Happened". Canadian Journal of Philosophy. 9 (1): 1–22. doi:10.1080/00455091.1979.10716233. S2CID 171382190.
- Nerlich, Graham (1979). "What Can Geometry Explain?". The British Journal for the Philosophy of Science. 30 (1): 69–83. doi:10.1093/bjps/30.1.69.
- Nerlich, Graham (1982). "Special Relativity is not based on causality". The British Journal for the Philosophy of Science. 33 (4): 361–388. doi:10.1093/bjps/33.4.361.
- Nerlich, Graham (1991). "How Euclidean geometry has misled metaphysics". Journal of Philosophy. 88 (4): 169–189. doi:10.2307/2026946. JSTOR 2026946.
- Nerlich, Graham (2005). "Can Parts of Space Move? On Paragraph Six of Newton's Scholium". Erkenntnis. 62 (1): 119–135. doi:10.1007/s10670-004-8709-4. JSTOR 20013315. S2CID 120784672.
- Petkov, V, ed. (2010). "Why Spacetime is Not a Hidden Cause: A Realist Story" (PDF). Space, Time and Spacetime Physical and Philosophical Implications of Minkowski's Unification of Space and Time. Springer Publishing. pp. 181–191. doi:10.1007/978-3-642-13538-5_8. ISBN 9783642135378.
