= Canberra Plan =

Philosophical method

In philosophy, the Canberra Plan is a contemporary program of methodology and analysis which answers questions about what the world is like according to physics. It is considered a naturalistic approach in metaphysics, which holds that metaphysics can explain the features of the world described by physics and what the different classes of everyday belief represent. A more detailed description of the plan refers to it as a family of doctrines which are grounded in a physicalist worldview as well as a priori philosophizing to explain our thoughts about our world as revealed by physics.

The Canberra Plan arose in the 1990s at the Australian National University in Canberra, Australia. Its originators were David Lewis and Frank Jackson. An important question which it raises concerns what to say once "It turns out that there is nothing of which the a priori theory is true."

There are those who say that the Canberra Plan could prove insufficient and inconsistent to effectively pick out a feature of or relationship in the world.

== Bibliography ==
- Braddon-Mitchell, David; Nola, Robert (2008). "Introducing the Canberra Plan". Conceptual Analysis and Philosophical Naturalism. MIT Press. doi:10.7551/mitpress/9780262012560.001.0001. ISBN 9780262255202.
- Papineau, David, "2.2 The Canberra Plan", in The Stanford Encyclopedia of Philosophy article on Naturalism
