= Knowledge argument =

Thought experiment in the philosophy of mind

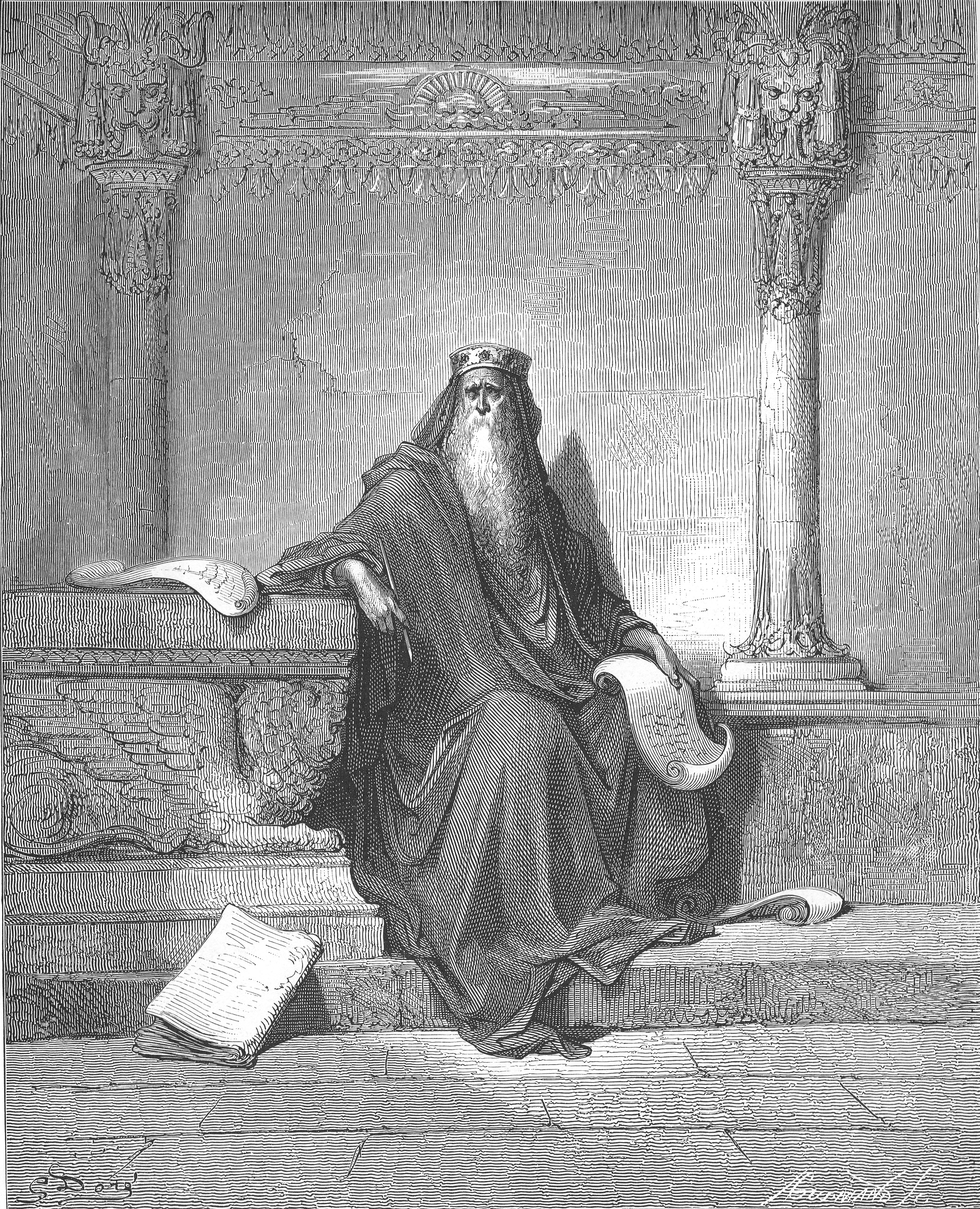
Did Mary learn something new?

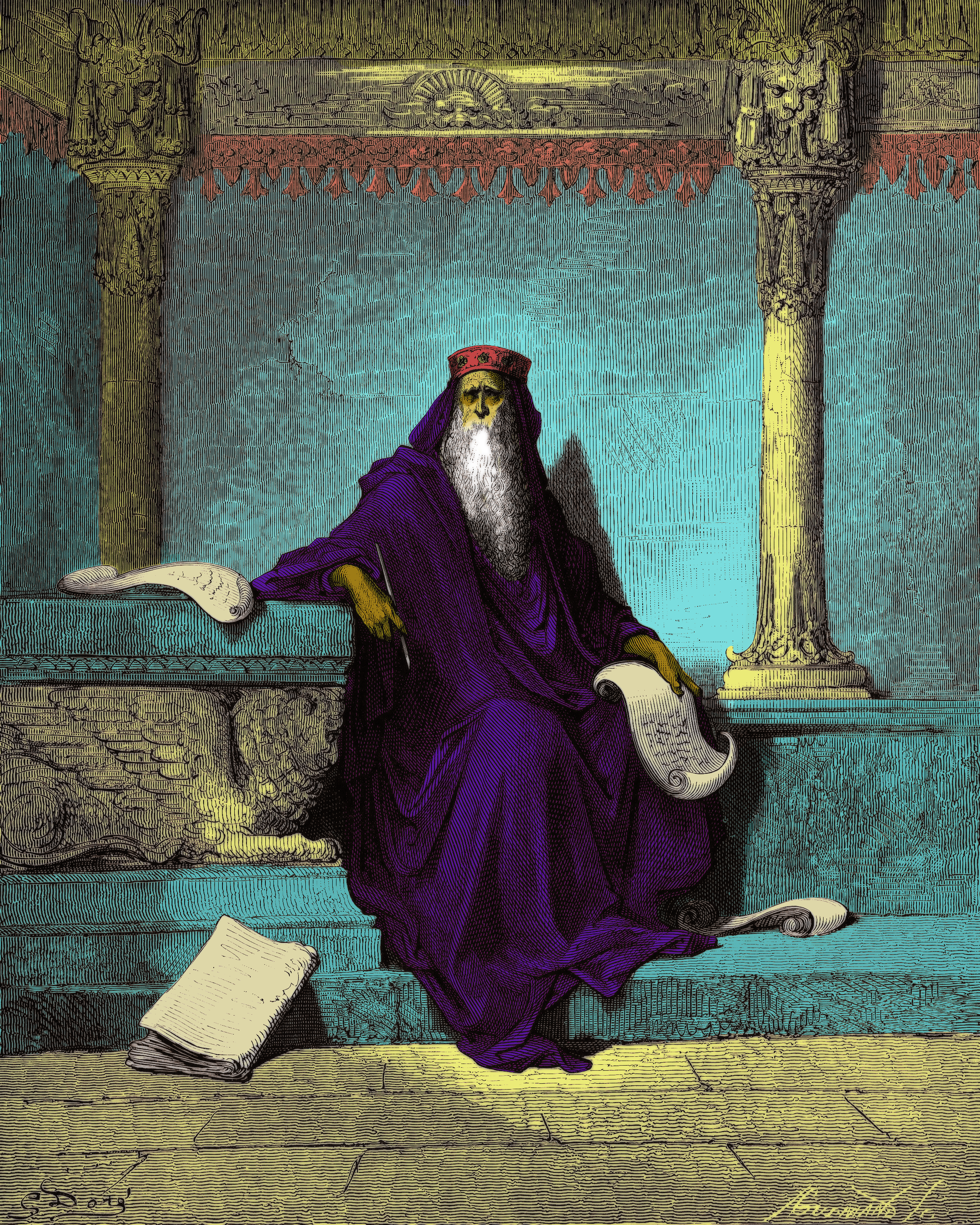

In philosophy of mind, the knowledge argument (also known as Mary's Room, Mary the Colour Scientist, or Mary the super-scientist) is a thought experiment proposed by Frank Jackson in his article "Epiphenomenal Qualia" (1982), and extended in "What Mary Didn't Know" (1986).

The thought experiment describes Mary, a scientist who exists in a black-and-white world where she has extensive access to physical descriptions of color, but no actual perceptual experience of color. Mary has learned everything there is to learn about color, but she has never actually experienced it for herself. The central question of the thought experiment is whether Mary will gain new knowledge when she goes outside the colorless world and experiences seeing in color.

The thought experiment is intended to argue against physicalism—the view that the universe, including all that is mental, is entirely physical. Jackson says that the "irresistible conclusion" is that "there are more properties than physicalists talk about". Jackson would eventually call himself a physicalist and say, in 2023, "I no longer accept the argument" though he feels that the argument should be "addressed really seriously if you are a physicalist".

The debate that emerged following its publication became the subject of an edited volume, There's Something About Mary (2004), which includes replies from such philosophers as Daniel Dennett, David Lewis, and Paul Churchland.

== Thought experiment ==
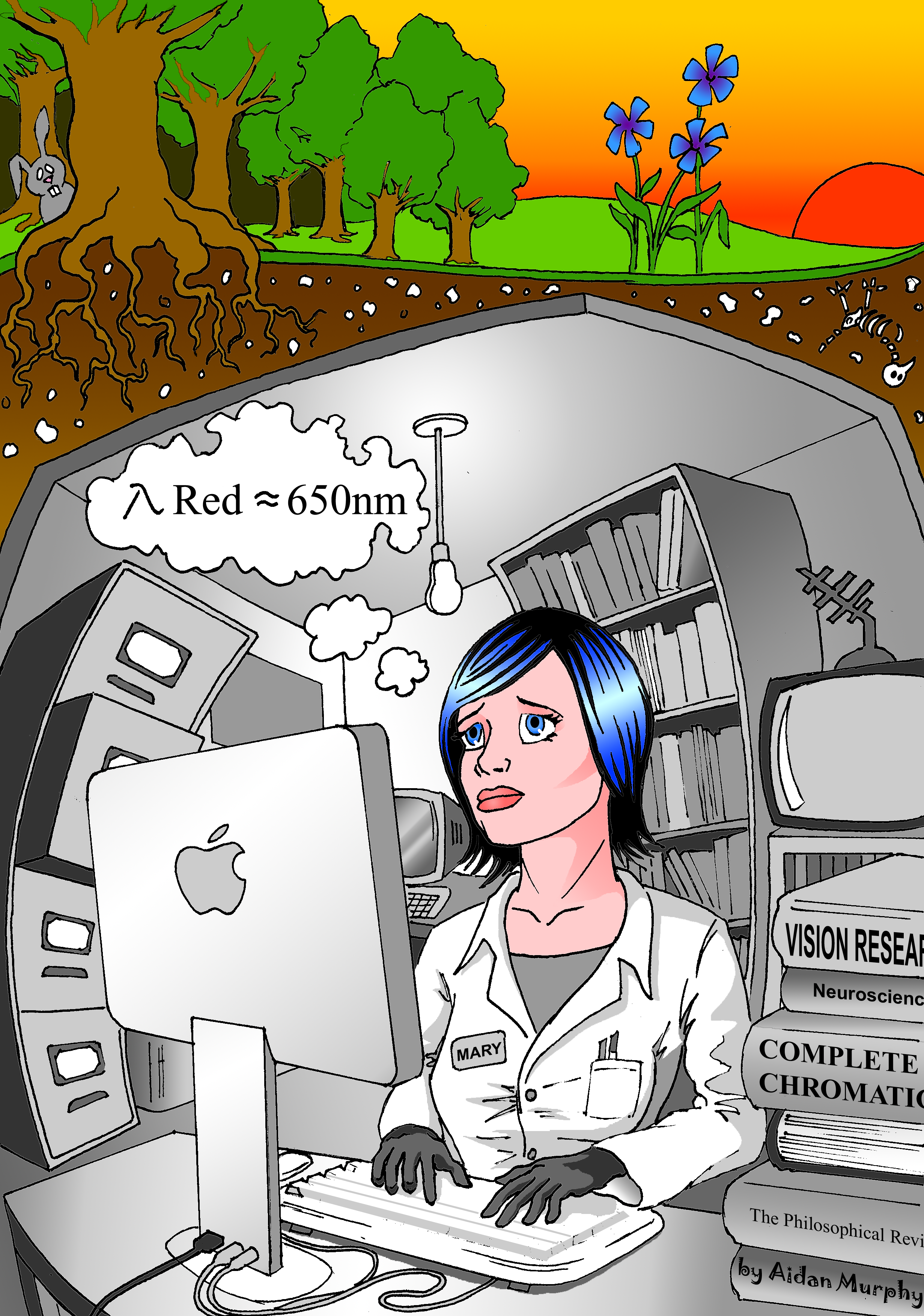
Mary in her room.

Mary is the second character put forward by Jackson in his article Epiphenomenal Qualia. The other is a gifted person called "Fred" who "has better colour vision than anyone else on record"; Specifically, Fred can see two different colours of red where ordinary colour vision only sees one.

The thought experiment was originally proposed by Jackson as follows:

Mary is a brilliant scientist who is, for whatever reason, forced to investigate the world from a black and white room via a black and white television monitor. She specialises in the neurophysiology of vision and acquires, let us suppose, all the physical information there is to obtain about what goes on when we see ripe tomatoes, or the sky, and use terms like 'red', 'blue', and so on...What will happen when Mary is released from her black and white room or is given a colour television monitor? Will she learn anything or not?

There is disagreement about how to summarize the premises and conclusion of Jackson's argument in this thought experiment. Paul Churchland did as follows:

1. Mary knows everything there is to know about brain states and their properties.
2. It is not the case that Mary knows everything there is to know about sensations and their properties.
3. Therefore, sensations and their properties are not the same as (≠) the brain states and their properties.

However, Jackson opposes it by saying that Churchland's formulation is not his intended argument. He especially objects to the first premise of Churchland's formulation: "The whole thrust of the knowledge argument is that Mary (before her release) does not know everything there is to know about brain states and their properties because she does not know about certain qualia associated with them. What is complete, according to the argument, is her knowledge of matters physical." He suggests his preferred interpretation:

1. Mary (before her release) knows everything physical there is to know about other people.
2. Mary (before her release) does not know everything there is to know about other people (because she learns something about them on her release).
3. Therefore, there are truths about other people (and herself) which escape the physicalist story.

Later on, Amy Kind proposes another summary for the argument:

1. While in the room, Mary has acquired all the physical facts there are about color sensations, including the sensation of seeing red.
2. When Mary exits the Room and sees a ripe red tomato, she learns a new fact about the sensation of seeing red, namely its subjective character.
3. Therefore, there are non-physical facts about color sensations. [From 1, 2]
4. If there are non-physical facts about color sensations, then color sensations are non-physical events.
5. Therefore, color sensations are non-physical events. [From 3, 4]
6. If color sensations are non-physical events, then physicalism is false.
7. Therefore, physicalism is false. [From 5, 6]

== Background ==
Jackson says there are quite a few similar arguments that predate his formulation, even going back as far as John Locke.

C. D. Broad, Herbert Feigl, and Thomas Nagel, over a fifty-year span, presented insight to the subject. Broad makes the following remarks, describing a thought experiment where an archangel has unlimited mathematical competences:

He would know exactly what the microscopic structure of ammonia must be; but he would be totally unable to predict that a substance with this structure must smell as ammonia does when it gets into the human nose. The utmost that he could predict on this subject would be that certain changes would take place in the mucous membrane, the olfactory nerves and so on. But he could not possibly know that these changes would be accompanied by the appearance of a smell in general or of the peculiar smell of ammonia in particular, unless someone told him so or he had smelled it for himself.

In 1958, Feigl theorized that a hypothetical Martian, studying human behavior, will lack human sentiments.

Nagel's essay "What Is It Like to Be a Bat?" takes a slightly different approach. He takes the perspective of humans attempting to understand the echolocation capabilities of bats. Even with the entire physical database at one's fingertips, humans would not be able to fully perceive or understand a bat's sensory system, namely what it is like to "see" the world through sound.

== Implications ==
Whether Mary learns something new upon experiencing color has two major implications: the existence of qualia and the knowledge argument against physicalism.

=== Qualia ===
If Mary learns something new upon seeing red, it shows that qualia (the subjective, qualitative properties of experiences, conceived as wholly independent of behavior and disposition) exist. Therefore, it must be conceded that qualia are real, since there is a difference between a person who has access to a particular quale and one who does not.

=== Refutation of physicalism ===
Jackson argues further, saying that if Mary does learn something new upon experiencing color, then physicalism is false. Specifically, the knowledge argument is an attack on the physicalist claim about the completeness of physical explanations of mental states. Mary may know everything about the science of color perception, but can she know what the experience of red is like if she has never seen red? Jackson contends that, yes, she has learned something new, via experience, and hence, physicalism is false.

=== Epiphenomenalism ===
Jackson believed in the explanatory completeness of physiology, that all behaviour is caused by physical forces of some kind. And the thought experiment seems to prove the existence of qualia, a non-physical part of the mind. Jackson argued that if both of these theses are true, then epiphenomenalism is true—the view that mental states are caused by physical states, but have no causal effects on the physical world.

Explanatory completeness of physiology	+	qualia (Mary's room)	=	epiphenomenalism

Thus, at the conception of the thought experiment, Jackson was an epiphenomenalist.

== Responses ==
Objections have been raised that have required the argument to be refined. Doubters cite various holes in the thought experiment that have arisen through critical examination.

Nemirow and Lewis present the "ability hypothesis", and Conee argues for the "acquaintance hypothesis". Both approaches attempt to demonstrate that Mary gains no new knowledge, but instead gains something else. If she in fact gains no new propositional knowledge, they contend, then what she does gain may be accounted for within the physicalist framework. These are the two most notable objections to Jackson's thought experiment, and the claim it sets out to make.

=== Design of the thought experiment ===
Some have objected to Jackson's argument on the grounds that the scenario described in the thought experiment itself is not possible. For example, Evan Thompson questioned the premise that Mary, simply by being confined to a monochromatic environment, would not have any color experiences, since she may be able to see color when dreaming, after rubbing her eyes, or in afterimages from light perception. However, Graham and Horgan suggest that the thought experiment can be refined to account for this: rather than situating Mary in a black and white room, one might stipulate that she was unable to experience color from birth, but was given this ability via medical procedure later in life. Nida-Rümelin recognizes that one might question whether this scenario would be possible given the science of color vision (although Graham and Horgan suggest it is), but argues it is not clear that this matters to the efficacy of the thought experiment, provided we can at least conceive of the scenario taking place.

Objections have also been raised that, even if Mary's environment were constructed as described in the thought experiment, she would not, in fact, learn something new if she stepped out of her black and white room to see the color red. Daniel Dennett asserts that if she already truly knew "everything about color", that knowledge would necessarily include a deep understanding of why and how human neurology causes us to sense the "qualia" of color. Moreover, that knowledge would include the ability to functionally differentiate between red and other colors. Mary would therefore already know exactly what to expect of seeing red, before ever leaving the room. Dennett argues that functional knowledge is identical to the experience, with no ineffable "qualia" left over. J. Christopher Maloney argues similarly:

If, as the argument allows, Mary does understand all that there is to know regarding the physical nature of colour vision, she would be in a position to imagine what colour vision would be like. It would be like being in physical state S_{k}, and Mary knows all about such physical states. Of course, she herself has not been in S_{k}, but that is no bar to her knowing what it would be like to be in S_{k}. For she, unlike us, can describe the nomic relations between S_{k} and other states of chromatic vision...Give her a precise description in the notation of neurophysiology of a colour vision state, and she will very likely be able to imagine what such a state would be like.

Surveying the literature on Jackson's argument, Nida-Rümelin identifies, however, that many simply doubt the claim that Mary would not gain new knowledge upon leaving the room, including physicalists who do not agree with Jackson's conclusions. Most cannot help but admit that "new information or knowledge comes her way after confinement", enough that this view "deserves to be described as the received physicalist view of the Knowledge Argument". Some philosophers have also objected to Jackson's first premise by arguing that Mary could not know all the physical facts about color vision prior to leaving the room. Owen Flanagan argues that Jackson's thought experiment "is easy to defeat". He grants that "Mary knows everything about color vision that can be expressed in the vocabularies of a complete physics, chemistry, and neuroscience", and then distinguishes between "metaphysical physicalism" and "linguistic physicalism":

Metaphysical physicalism simply asserts that what there is, and all there is, is physical stuff and its relations. Linguistic physicalism is the thesis that everything physical can be expressed or captured in the languages of the basic sciences…Linguistic physicalism is stronger than metaphysical physicalism and less plausible.

Flanagan argues that, while Mary has all the facts that are expressible in "explicitly physical language", she can only be said to have all the facts if one accepts linguistic physicalism. A metaphysical physicalist can simply deny linguistic physicalism and hold that Mary's learning what seeing red is like, though it cannot be expressed in language, is nevertheless a fact about the physical world, since the physical is all that exists. Similarly to Flanagan, Torin Alter contends that Jackson conflates physical facts with "discursively learnable" facts, without justification:

...some facts about conscious experiences of various kinds cannot be learned through purely discursive means. This, however, does not yet license any further conclusions about the nature of the experiences that these discursively unlearnable facts are about. In particular, it does not entitle us to infer that these experiences are not physical events.

Nida-Rümelin argues in response to such views that it is "hard to understand what it is for a property or a fact to be physical once we drop the assumption that physical properties and physical facts are just those properties and facts that can be expressed in physical terminology."

=== The three strategies ===
Kind brings up three strategies that have been brought up in reaction to this argument: the ability analysis, the acquaintance analysis, and the old fact/new guise analysis.

==== Ability hypothesis ====
Several objections to the argument have been raised on the grounds that Mary does not gain new factual knowledge when she leaves the room, but rather a new ability. Nemirow claims that "knowing what an experience is like is the same as knowing how to imagine having the experience". He argues that Mary only obtained the ability to do something, not the knowledge of something new. Lewis put forth a similar argument, claiming that Mary gained an ability to "remember, imagine and recognize". In the response to Jackson's knowledge argument, they both agree that Mary makes a genuine discovery when she sees red for the first time, but deny her discovery involves coming to know some facts of which she was not already cognizant before her release. Therefore, what she obtained is a discovery of new abilities rather than new facts; her discovery of what it is like to experience color consists merely in her gaining new ability of how to do certain things, but not gaining new factual knowledge. In light of such considerations, Churchland distinguishes between two senses of knowing, "knowing how" and "knowing that", where knowing how refers to abilities and knowing that refers to knowledge of facts. He aims to reinforce this line of objection by appealing to the different locations in which each type of knowledge is represented in the brain, arguing that there is a true, demonstratively physical distinction between them. By distinguishing that Mary does not learn new facts, simply abilities, it helps to negate the problem posed by the thought experiment to the physicalist standpoint.

In response, Levin argues that a novel color experience does in fact yield new factual knowledge, such as "information about the color's similarities and compatibilities with other colors, and its effect on other of our mental states." Tye counters that Mary could have (and would have, given the stipulations of the thought experiment) learned all such facts prior to leaving the room, without needing to experience the color firsthand. For example, Mary could know the fact "red is more like orange than green" without ever experiencing the colors in question.

One might accept Conee's arguments that imaginative ability is neither necessary nor sufficient for knowing what it is like to see a color, but preserve a version of the ability hypothesis that employs an ability other than imagination. For example, Brie Gertler discusses the option that what Mary gains is not an ability to imagine colors, but an ability to recognize colors by their phenomenal quality.

Kind offers a concrete and more realistic example: a driving test, where a person would have to complete a written test where their knowledge of road laws and facts will be tested, as well as an in-car exam, where they must display their ability to drive correctly while following the laws they know as well as putting their facts into practice. One can have all the knowledge-that (knowing all the safety rules related to driving) while having no knowledge-how (driving safely). Kind characterizes Mary's understanding of color sensation as what it's like knowledge, a sub-category of knowledge-that. She states that while Mary does learn something upon seeing the red tomato for the first time and gains knowledge-how; David Lewis claims Mary is now able to recognize, remember and imagine seeing the color red. Advocates of the ability analysis hold the belief that while Mary may have a surprised reaction to seeing red for the first time, she doesn't gain any new facts about the sensation of red.

==== Acquaintance hypothesis ====
The acquaintance analysis argues that Mary is able to learn something new without obtaining accurate knowledge. Due to his dissatisfaction with the ability hypothesis, Earl Conee presents another variant. Conee's acquaintance hypothesis describes a third category of knowledge "by acquaintance of an experience".

Tye also defends a version of the acquaintance hypothesis that he compares to Conee's, though he clarifies that acquaintance with a color should not be equated to applying a concept to one's color experience.

In Conee's account, one can come to know (be acquainted with) a phenomenal quality only by experiencing it, but not by knowing facts about it as Mary did. This is different from other physical objects of knowledge: one comes to know a city, for example, simply by knowing facts about it. For example: A person may know facts about Sydney, Australia, but they won't actually be acquainted with it until they have been there in person. Gertler uses this disparity to oppose Conee's account: a dualist who posits the existence of qualia has a way of explaining it, with reference to qualia as different entities than physical objects; while Conee describes the disparity, Gertler argues that his physicalist account does nothing to explain it.

==== The old fact/new guise analysis ====
The response to the knowledge argument depends on whether we can accurately capture the new type of knowledge Mary gains when she leaves the room. Those who propose the ability analysis and the acquaintance analysis both agree that Mary learns something new, but they differ on whether this new knowledge can be reduced to factual knowledge or whether it requires direct experience. Another analysis, called the old fact/new guise analysis, denies that Mary learns something new at all. Instead, it suggests that Mary gains a new understanding of an old fact in a different way. This analysis depends on the idea that there are many ways to express the same fact. For example, the fact that Bruce Wayne is 6'2" tall can also be expressed as "Batman is 6'2" tall" or "Bruce Wayne mesure 1.8796 mètres" in French. Proponents of the old fact/new guise analysis argue that Mary gains a new understanding of an old fact through the acquisition of a phenomenal concept of red. They believe that Mary is now able to express an old fact about the sensation of red in a new way. However, whether this analysis is successful in responding to the knowledge argument depends on how phenomenal concepts are defined in a way that is compatible with physicalism.

=== The neural basis of qualia ===
V.S. Ramachandran and Edward Hubbard of the Center for Brain and Cognition at UCSD argue that Mary might do one of three things upon seeing a red apple for the first time:

1. Mary says she sees nothing but gray.
2. She has the "Wow!" response from subjectively experiencing the color for the first time.
3. She experiences a form of blindsight for color, in which she reports seeing no difference between a red apple and an apple painted gray, but when asked to point to the red apple, she correctly does.

They explain further: "Which of these three possible outcomes will actually occur? We believe we've learned the answer from a colorblind synesthete subject. Much like the theoretical Mary, our colorblind synesthete volunteer cannot see certain hues, because of deficient color receptors. However, when he looks at numbers, his synesthesia enables him to experience colors in his mind that he has never seen in the real world. He calls these "Martian colors". The fact that color cells (and corresponding colors) can activate in his brain helps us answer the philosophical question: we suggest that the same thing will happen to Mary."

Ramachandran and Hubbard's contribution is in terms of exploring "the neural basis of qualia" by "using pre-existing, stable differences in the conscious experiences of people who experience synaesthesia compared with those who do not" but, they note that "this still doesn't explain why these particular events are qualia laden and others are not (Chalmers' "hard problem") but at least it narrows the scope of the problem" (p. 25).

=== Dualist responses and Jackson's reconsideration of the argument ===
Jackson's argument is meant to support mind–body dualism, the view that the mind, or at least some aspects of the mind, are non-physical. Nida-Rümelin contends that, because mind–body dualism is relatively unpopular among contemporary philosophers, and there are also not many examples of dualist responses to the knowledge argument; nevertheless, she points out that there are some prominent examples of dualists responding to the Knowledge Argument worth noting.

Jackson himself went on to reject epiphenomenalism and mind–body dualism altogether. He argues that, because when Mary first sees red, she says "Wow!", it must be Mary's qualia that causes her to say "Wow!". This contradicts epiphenomenalism because it involves a conscious state causing an overt speech behavior. Since the Mary's room thought experiment seems to create this contradiction, there must be something wrong with it. Jackson now believes that the physicalist approach (from a perspective of indirect realism) provides the better explanation. In contrast to epiphenomenalism, Jackson says that the experience of red is entirely contained in the brain, and the experience immediately causes further changes in the brain (e.g. creating memories). This is more consilient with neuroscience's understanding of color vision. Jackson suggests that Mary is simply discovering a new way for her brain to represent qualities that exist in the world. In a similar argument, philosopher Philip Pettit likens the case of Mary to patients with akinetopsia, the inability to perceive the motion of objects. If someone were raised in a stroboscopic room and subsequently 'cured' of the akinetopsia, they would not be surprised to discover any new facts about the world (they do, in fact, know that objects move). Instead, their surprise would come from their brain now allowing them to see this motion.

Despite a lack of dualist responses overall and Jackson's own change of view, there are more recent instances of prominent dualists defending the knowledge argument. David Chalmers, one of the most prominent contemporary dualists, considers Jackson's thought experiment to successfully show that materialism is false. Chalmers considers responses along the lines of the "ability hypothesis" objection (described above) to be the most promising objections, but unsuccessful: even if Mary does gain a new ability to imagine or recognize colors, she would also necessarily gain factual knowledge about the colors she now sees, such as the fact of how the experience of seeing red relates to the physical brain states underlying it. He also considers arguments that knowledge of what it is like to see red and of the underlying physical mechanisms are actually knowledge of the same fact, just under a different "mode of presentation", meaning Mary did not truly gain new factual knowledge. Chalmers rejects these, arguing that Mary still necessarily gains new factual knowledge about how the experience and the physical processes relate to one another, i.e. a fact about exactly what kind of experience is caused by those processes. Martine Nida-Rümelin defends a complex, though similar, view, involving properties of experience she calls "phenomenal properties".

== See also ==
- Explanatory gap
- Leibniz's gap
- Phenomenal concept strategy
- Olo (color)

== Sources ==
- Broad, C. D. (1925). The Mind and His Place in Nature. Routledge & Kegan.
- Dennett, Daniel (1991). Consciousness Explained. Boston: Little, Brown and Co. ISBN 978-0-316-18065-8. OCLC 23648691.
- Dennett, Daniel (2006). "What RoboMary Knows". In Alter, Torin (ed.). Phenomenal Concepts and Phenomenal Knowledge. Oxford Oxfordshire: Oxford University Press. ISBN 978-0-19-517165-5. OCLC 63195957.
- Feigl, H. (1958). "The Mental and the Physical". In H. Feigl; M. Scriven; G. Maxwell (eds.). Concepts, Theories, and the Mind-Body Problem. Minnesota Studies in the Philosophy of Science. Vol. II. Minneapolis: University of Minnesota Press. pp. 370–497.
