= Henry Tasman Lovell =

Australian psychologist (1878–1958)

Henry Tasman Lovell (January 6, 1878 - September 30, 1958) was an Australian psychologist. He was born at East Kempsey, New South Wales, Australia.
