= Peter Godfrey-Smith =

Australian philosopher and writer (born 1965)

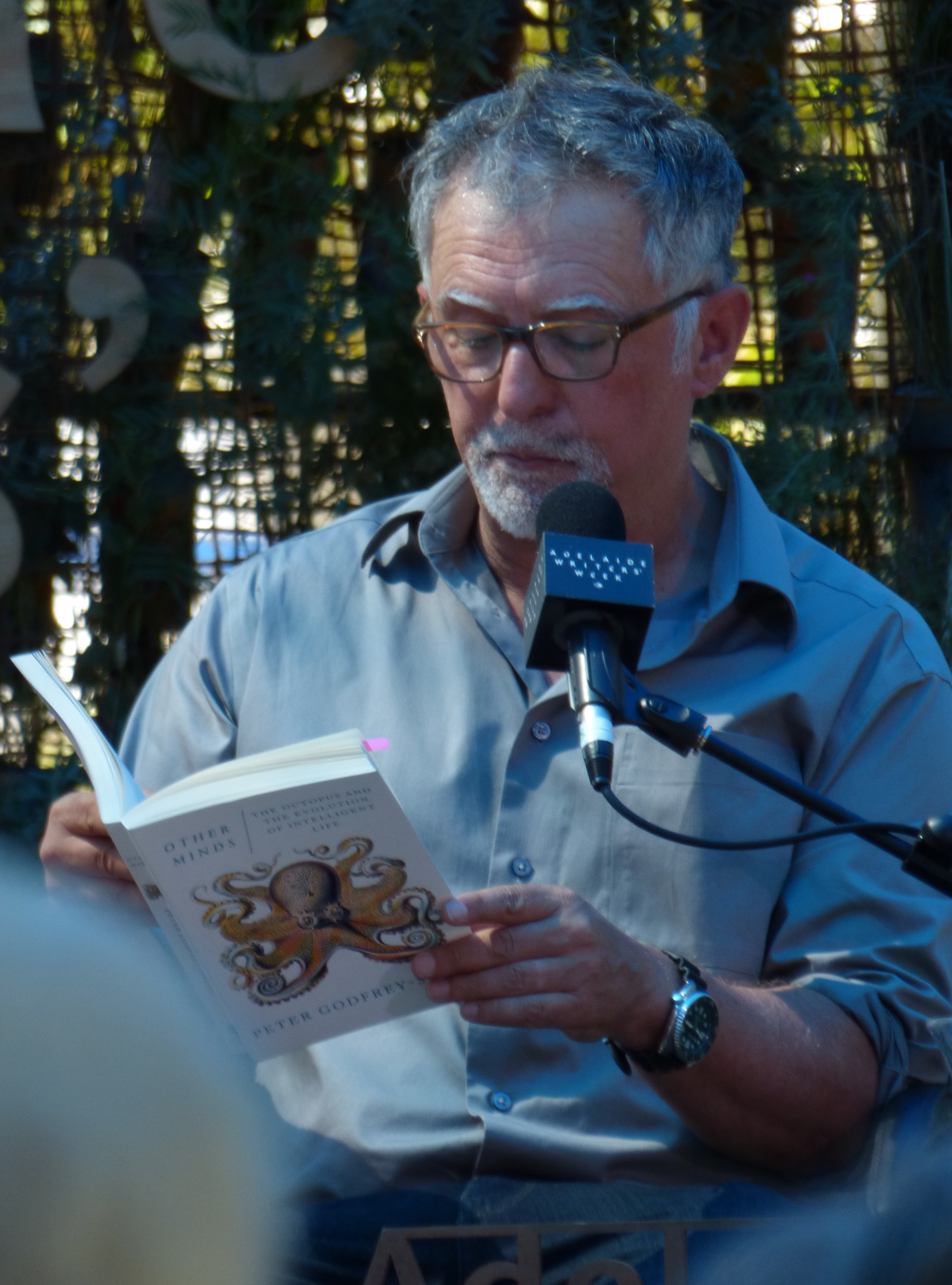
- Peter Godfrey-Smith reads from Other Minds at Adelaide Writers Week 2018
- Born: 1965 (age 60–61)
- Awards: Lakatos Award

Education
- Education: University of Sydney; UC San Diego
- Thesis: Teleonomy and the Philosophy of Mind (1991)
- Doctoral advisor: Philip Kitcher

Philosophical work
- Institutions: University of Sydney; CUNY Graduate Center; Harvard University; Australian National University; Stanford University
- Language: English
- Main interests: Philosophy of biology; Philosophy of mind
- Website: petergodfreysmith.com

Peter Godfrey-Smith (born 1965) is an Australian philosopher of science and writer, who is currently Professor of History and Philosophy of Science at the University of Sydney. He works primarily in philosophy of biology and philosophy of mind, and also has interests in general philosophy of science, pragmatism (especially the work of John Dewey), and some parts of metaphysics and epistemology. Godfrey-Smith was elected to the American Philosophical Society in 2022.

== Education and career ==
Born in Australia in 1965, Godfrey-Smith received a Ph.D. in philosophy from the University of California, San Diego in 1991 under the supervision of Philip Kitcher. He previously taught at Harvard University, Stanford University, Australian National University, and the CUNY Graduate Center. Godfrey-Smith was the recipient of the Lakatos Award for his 2009 book, Darwinian Populations and Natural Selection which discusses the philosophical foundations of the theory of evolution.

He has criticized the arguments of intelligent design proponents. He was an early critic of Covid-19 lockdown measures, beginning with a series of Twitter posts in January 2021.

== Other Minds ==
A sea diver and underwater photographer and videographer since 2008, Godfrey-Smith has observed in situ the behavior of different cephalopods (octopuses, squids, cuttlefish). In 2016, he published the book Other Minds: The Octopus, the Sea, and the Deep Origins of Consciousness. It explores the origin of sentience, consciousness and intelligence in the animal kingdom, specifically how it evolved in cephalopods compared to mammals and birds.

== Books ==
- Complexity and the Function of Mind in Nature. Cambridge: Cambridge University Press. 1996. ISBN 0-521-45166-3. OCLC 32468942.
- Theory and Reality: an Introduction to the Philosophy of Science (1st ed.). Chicago: University of Chicago Press. 2003. ISBN 0-226-30062-5. OCLC 51223665.
- Darwinian populations and natural selection. Oxford: Oxford University Press. 2009. ISBN 978-0-19-156778-0. OCLC 373185464.
- Philosophy of Biology. Princeton University Press. 2014. ISBN 9780691140018. OCLC 881399003.
- Other Minds: The Octopus, the Sea, and the Deep Origins of Consciousness. New York: William Collins. 2016. ISBN 978-0-374-22776-0. OCLC 957696590.
- Metazoa: Animal Life and the Birth of the Mind. New York: Farrar, Straus and Giroux. 2020. ISBN 978-0-374-20794-6. OCLC 1158510266.
- Living on Earth: Forests, Corals, Consciousness, and the Making of the World. New York: Farrar, Straus and Giroux. 2024. ISBN 978-0-37418-993-8. OCLC 1435751478.
