= Max Charlesworth =

Australian philosopher and public intellectual (1925–2014)

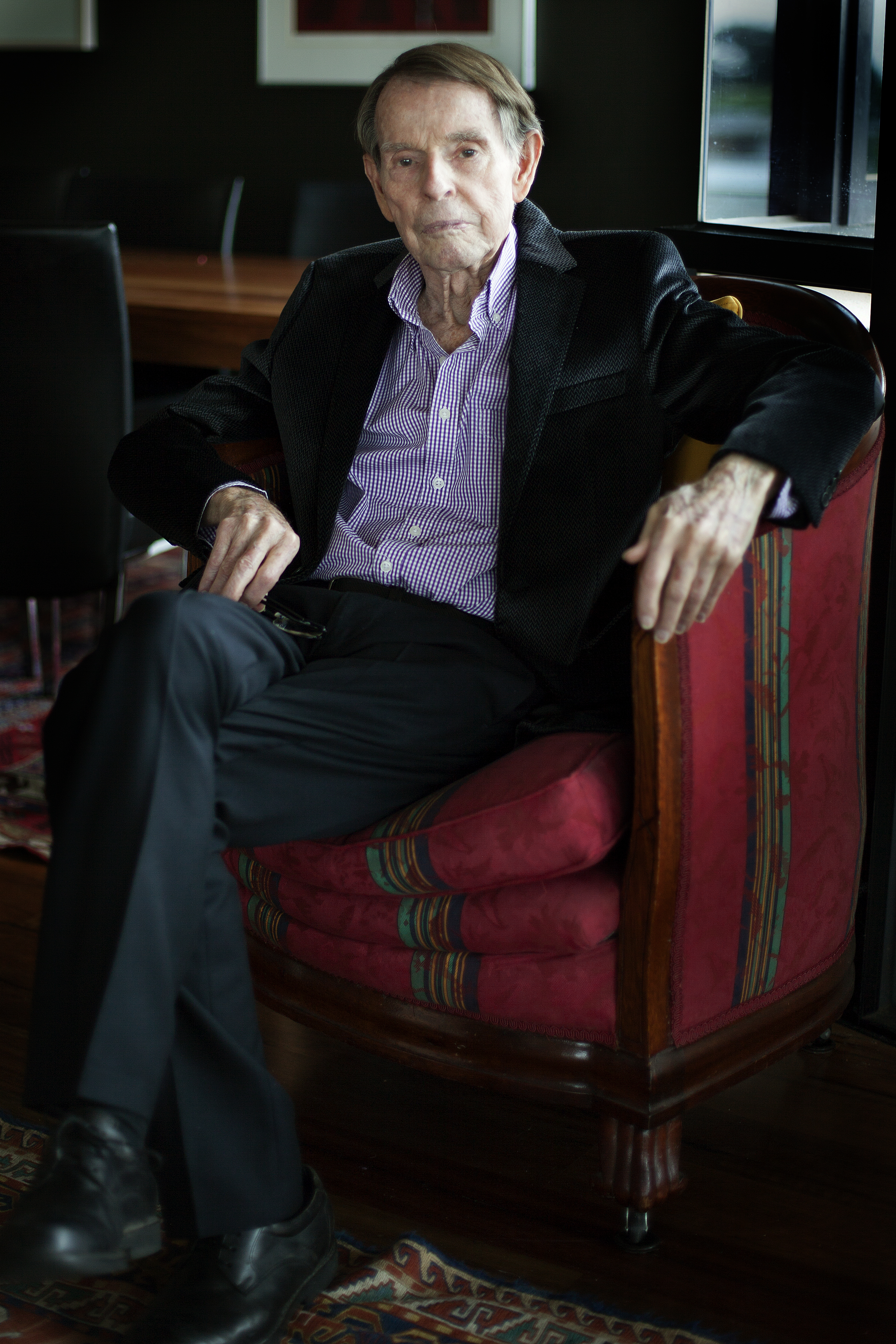
Charlesworth at his Melbourne apartment

Maxwell John Charlesworth AO FAHA (30 December 1925 – 2 June 2014) was an Australian philosopher and public intellectual. He taught and wrote on a wide range of areas including the philosophy of religion and the role of the Church in a liberal democratic society; Australian Aboriginal culture and religions; European philosophy from medieval to continental; bioethics and modern science’s role in society; and the philosophy of education. In 1990, he was made an Officer of the Order of Australia for his contributions to Australian society in the fields of education and bioethics.

Charlesworth has been described as "exceptional among Australian philosophers for his integrity, for his capacity to change and develop as the balance of evidence shifted, and for his willingness to pioneer new developments."

== Biography ==
Charlesworth was born in Numurkah, Victoria on 30 December 1925, the younger son of William and Mabel Charlesworth. He was educated at government schools in Numurkah, and then at Assumption College, Kilmore. Charlesworth moved to Melbourne to study at the University of Melbourne, obtaining a Bachelor of Arts with honours in 1946 and a Masters of Arts in 1948.

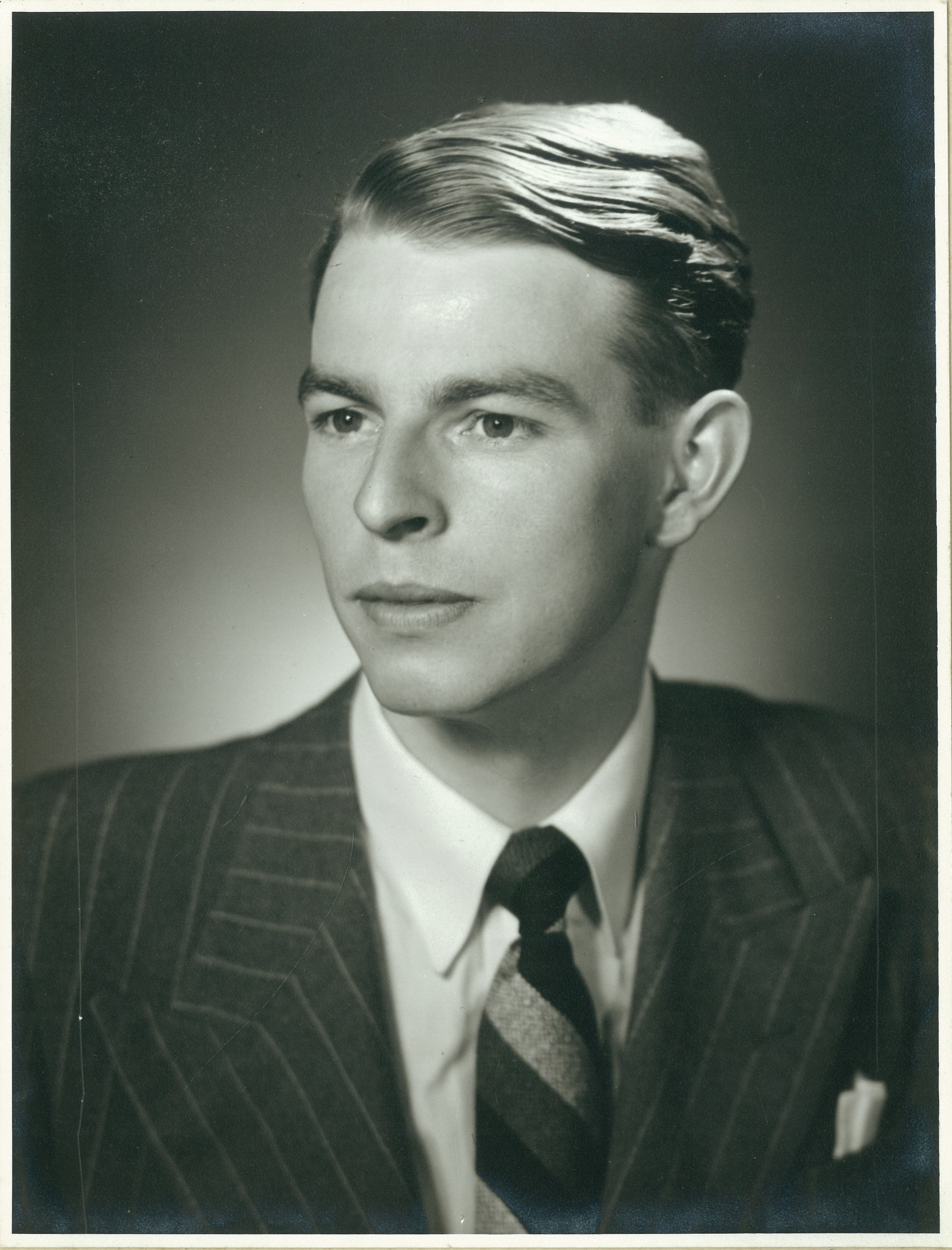
Charlesworth as a young man

Charlesworth was awarded the first Mannix Travelling Scholarship for overseas study in 1950, the same year he married Stephanie Charlesworth (née Armstrong). However, having contracted tuberculosis, Charlesworth was forced to delay taking up the scholarship and spent the next two years at the Gresswell Sanatorium in Victoria.

After recovering, Charlesworth followed the advice of his mentor, Professor Alexander Boyce Gibson and continued his postgraduate studies in 1953 at the Université Catholique de Louvain (UCL) in Belgium. This decision was based on the University's reputation for excellence in both theology and contemporary continental philosophy. He was attracted in particular by the archives of Edmund Husserl, the German phenomenologist, which were based at UCL, and planned to write his dissertation on phenomenology. However his PhD supervisor, Professor Georges van Riet, insisted that Charlesworth undertake instead a critical study of linguistic analysis, bringing Charlesworth into productive contact with leading Wittgensteinian philosophers such as Elizabeth Anscombe and Peter Geach. Charlesworth gained his Doctorate in Philosophy, avec la plus grande distinction, from UCL in 1955 and was then appointed to a lectureship at the University of Auckland in 1956.

Charlesworth's first book, Philosophy and Linguistic Analysis, which was based on his PhD, was published in 1959, the same year he was appointed to the Philosophy Department at the University of Melbourne. Over the next sixteen years at Melbourne, Charlesworth initiated a broad philosophical syllabus. He introduced a course on the philosophy of religion, to the dismay of many in the university community who thought the study of religion was inappropriate in a secular institution. Charlesworth also established a course in Medieval philosophy, a subject largely ignored in Australian philosophical circles until that point. Perhaps most controversially, he introduced a course on continental philosophy, encountering scepticism from his colleagues, the majority of whom were analytic philosophers.

During his time at Melbourne University, Charlesworth was also a Nuffield Fellow at the Warburg Institute in London from 1963 until 1964 and a Visiting Professor at the University of Notre Dame, Indiana, United States between 1968 and 1969.

Charlesworth served as Chair of the Philosophy Department from 1974-1975 and was appointed Foundation Dean of Humanities at the new Deakin University in Geelong in 1975.

At Deakin Charlesworth created a distinctive philosophy department with interests in psychoanalytic theory, continental philosophy, religious studies, and Indian philosophy. He retired in 1990, and was appointed as Emeritus Professor.

During his time at Deakin, Charlesworth became a visiting professor at the Fondation Maison des Sciences de l’Homme in 1980. He was a visiting professor at his alma mater, the Université Catholique de Louvain, in 1972 and again in 2006.

Charlesworth’s influence extended beyond the academy; he believed that philosophy should concern itself less with arcane technicalities and more with the problems facing society. An example of his influence is his role as Chairman of the Victorian Consultative Committee for the United Nations International Year of Peace in 1986.

Charlesworth served on the National Consultative Committee on Bioethics as well as in the Victorian Government's Standing Committee on Infertility. He was also the Chair of the Advisory Committee for the Monash University's Centre for Human Bioethics from 1987-1990, before becoming the Director of the National Institute for Law, Ethics and Public Affairs at Griffith University in Queensland from 1992-1994.

Charlesworth is also one of only two Australian philosophers (the other being John Passmore) to be invited to deliver the Australian Broadcasting Corporation's annual Boyer lectures. In 1989, his series of lectures, entitled Life, Death, Genes and Ethics: Biotechnology and Bioethics, focussed on the dilemmas in bioethics.

For his contributions to Australian society in education and bioethics, Charlesworth was made and Officer of the Order of Australia in 1990. He was also elected as a Fellow of the Australian Academy of the Humanities.

As a Catholic influenced by the ideas of John Henry Newman, John Stuart Mill, and John Courtney Murray, Charlesworth had a strong commitment to the pivotal role of conscience in both religion and public life. This sometimes put him at odds with the hierarchy of the Australian Catholic Church.

Charlesworth opposed the anti-communist 'Movement' during the 1950s and 1960s, led by B. A. Santamaria's. He considered that the Movement's insistence that Christian values should have a privileged place in society distorted the proper relationship between Church and State. Charlesworth aired his critique in the pages of the Catholic Worker, a journal he co-edited with Tony Coady in the late 1960s and early 1970s. The journal was denounced by members of the Catholic clergy and its distribution in Churches forbidden. Integrating his liberal philosophy with a progressive social vision, Charlesworth and other contributors to the Catholic Worker questioned the moral case for the Vietnam War and Catholic teachings on contraception, abortion, and divorce among others.

Some of this intellectual activism was inspired by developments in Vatican II, with the Council’s more accommodating and open attitudes to other religions and to the non-religious. Indeed, in 1970, Charlesworth was appointed to the Vatican’s Secretariat for Non-Believers.

Charlesworth's co-founded of the academic journal Sophia with Graeme E. de Graaff in 1962 to promote study of philosophy of religion. Charlesworth was the co-editor of the journal from its inception until 1990. In 2012, the journal published a special 50th anniversary volume celebrating Charlesworth and his work, in which Charlesworth himself wrote an article entitled "Translating Religious Texts."

Charlesworth died in 2014 survived by his wife, Stephanie, their seven children (Sara, Hilary, Stephen, Lucy, Bruno, Anna and Esther), and eleven grandchildren.

After his death, Charlesworth was awarded a posthumous Honorary Doctorate of Letters in 2014 from Deakin University "for distinguished academic services in the fields of education, humanities and bioethics." Foundation House, the Victorian Foundation for Survivors of Tourture, of which Charlesworth was a founding patron, also instituted the annual Max Charlesworth Oration lecture series in his honour.

== Philosophy ==
Charlesworth was classically trained in philosophy, but his approach to its practice was unusual for the time in Australia. He emphasised the importance of philosophical engagement in current social dilemmas and presentation of philosophical ideas accessibly.

Charlesworth had a pluralistic approach to both philosophy and religion, which shaped his ideas on life in liberal democratic societies. This pluralism prompted Charlesworth to work on a wide range of topics. As he grew older he became less inclined to study concepts themselves and more inclined to study how knowledge is constructed and by whom.

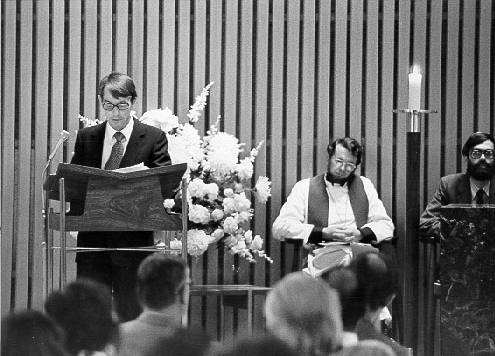
Charlesworth delivering his ‘Liberal Education and Religious Values’ lecture at Monash University's Religious Centre to mark the beginning of the Academic Year, 5 March 1981.

=== Religion ===
While Charlesworth was brought up as a Catholic, he came to challenge orthodox views on the relationship between Church and State.

Charlesworth was not solely interested in Catholicism or even just the greater Christian tradition: he had a fundamental curiosity in the variety of the world’s religions, how they worked, and why. He examined the way different religions responded to basic ethical questions, producing a children’s book, illustrated by Robert Ingpen, entitled Religious Worlds. Wayne Hudson has noted that "without abandoning his personal Catholicism, [Charlesworth] embraced the more stringent implications of pluralism within the framework of liberal political philosophy". He came indeed to see all religions as creative inventions.

=== Australian Aboriginal culture ===
Charlesworth wrote much on Australian Aboriginal land rights, cultures, and religious traditions. Working with anthropologists, Charlesworth insisted that Aboriginal religions should be taken seriously in their own right as systems of spiritual meaning rather than simply as cultural artefacts.

This was an aspect of his attempts to influence the way that Australian Settler society understood Aboriginal society.

=== European philosophy ===
From medieval philosophy Charlesworth identified religious thinkers with modern relevance. He translated and commented on St. Anselm's Proslogion as well as "The World Order", the 15th volume of St. Thomas Aquinas' Summa Theologiae from the original Latin. The role of translation continued to fascinate Charlesworth and his last article, written in 2012 for Sophia, was on the problems of translating religious texts.

Charlesworth was also engaged by contemporary European philosophies, from existentialism to postmodernism. In 1975, Charlesworth produced a series of radio programmes for the ABC, which were later turned into a book, called The Existentialists and Jean-Paul Sartre. These broadcasts introduced an Australian audience to the main tenets of existentialism, including through interviews with Jean-Paul Sartre and Simone de Beauvoir, as well as various critiques.

=== Bioethics and the social role of science ===
The 1980s saw the development of new scientific technologies affecting human life, including assisted reproductive technologies such as in vitro fertilisation and surrogacy. Debates about the ethical implications of these technologies were polarised between some scientists arguing for freedom in experimentation and some religious groups, contending for restraints on these developments in line with religious beliefs. Charlesworth attempted to bridge the divide between the two groups, while acknowledging the difficulty of resolving ethical issues in a liberal democratic society where there exists no common standard of morality. These ideas are most fully developed in his ABC Boyer Lectures Life, Death, Genes and Ethics: Biotechnology and Bioethics.

Charlesworth was also concerned with the social role of modern science. He wrote on the effect of science in society, and on the nature of scientific communities themselves, co-authoring Life Among the Scientists. This was an anthropological study of scientists at the Walter and Eliza Hall Institute of Medical Research in Melbourne.

=== Education ===
Charlesworth wrote extensively on the philosophy of education, particularly the role of universities in modern society.

As Foundation Dean of Humanities at Deakin University in Geelong, Charlesworth worked to make higher education available to mature-age students and others who found access difficult, developing a model influenced by the Open University in the UK.

Charlesworth devised interdisciplinary courses that brought many apparently disparate philosophical fields together. The idea was not to train professional philosophers but to allow philosophy to make a significant difference in people’s lives beyond the university. This same ethos motivated Charlesworth's 2007 book Philosophy for Beginners.

== Select bibliography ==
=== Religion ===
- Philosophy of Religion: The Historic Approaches, Herder and Herder, New York, 1972.
- Religious Worlds, Hill of Content Publishing, Melbourne, 1985. (With Robert Ingpen as illustrator)
- Charlesworth, Max (1988). "Australian Catholic intellectuals : the Catholic Worker and the Movement". In Brian Head; James Walter (eds.). Intellectual movements and Australian society. Melbourne: Oxford University Press. pp. 274–288.
- ‘Augustine and Aquinas: Church and State’, in Political Thinkers, ed. David Muschamp, 1986, pp. 39–50.
- 'Ecumenism between the world religions’, Sophia, vol. 34, no. 1, 1995, pp.140-160.
- Religious Inventions: Four Essays, Cambridge University Press, 1997.
- Philosophy and Religion: from Plato to Postmodernism, One World, Oxford, 2002.
- A Democratic Church: Reforming the Values and Institutions of the Catholic Church, John Garratt Publishing, Melbourne, 2008.

=== Australian Aboriginal studies ===
- The Aboriginal Land Rights Movement, Hodja Educational Resources Cooperative, 1984.
- Religion in Aboriginal Australia : an anthology, University of Queensland Press, 1984. (as co-editor with Howard Morphy, Diane Bell, & Kenneth Maddock)
- Ancestor Spirits: Aspects of Australian Aboriginal Life, Deakin University Press, 1990. (co-author with Richard Kimber & Noel Wallace)
- Religious Business: Essays on Australian Aboriginal Spirituality, Cambridge University Press, 1998. (as editor)
- Aboriginal Religions in Australia: An Anthology of Recent Writings, Ashgate, U.K, 2005. (co-editor with Francoise Dussart & Howard Morphy)

=== Medieval and Continental philosophy ===
- Philosophy and Linguistic Analysis, Duquesne University Press, Pittsburgh, 1959.
- St Anselm’s Proslogion, Oxford, Clarendon Press, 1965.
- Thomas Aquinas' Summa Theologiae: Volume 15, The World Order: 1a. 110-119, Cambridge University Press, 1970.
- The Existentialists and Jean Paul Sartre, University of Queensland Press, 1975.

=== Bioethics ===
- Life, Death, Genes, and Ethics: Biotechnology and bioethics (1989 Boyer lectures), ABC Books, 1989.
- Life Among The Scientists: An Anthropological Study of an Australian Scientific Community, Oxford University Press, 1989. (co-author with Lindsay Farrell, Terry, Stokes, & David Turnbull)
- Bioethics in a Liberal Society, Cambridge University Press, 1993. (German, Spanish, and Italian translations)
- ‘Whose Body? Feminist Views on Reproductive Technology’, in Troubled Bodies: Critical Perspectives on Postmodernism, Medical Ethics and the Body, ed. Paul Komesaroff, Duke University Press, 1995.
- 'Don't Blame the ‘Bio’ — Blame the ‘Ethics’: Varieties of (bio) ethics and the challenge of pluralism', Journal of Bioethical Inquiry, vol.2, no1, 2005, pp. 10–17.

=== Education ===
- 'Education and the State', The Australian Catholic Record, July, 1965.
- 'Education and Cultural Diversity', Melbourne Studies in Education, vol.28, no.1, 1986, pp. 1–13.
- The Responsibility of Intellectuals : Universities and Society in Australia: The Fourth Charles Joseph LaTrobe Memorial Lecture, La Trobe University, 1978.
- Philosophy for Beginners, University of Queensland Press, 2007.
