= Peter Forrest (philosopher) =

Australian philosopher

Peter Forrest FAHA
- Born: Peter Richard Haddow Forrest; 1948 (age 77–78); Liverpool, England

Academic background
- Education: Balliol College, Oxford; Harvard University; University of Tasmania; University of Sydney
- Thesis: On the Virtual Groups Defined by Ergodic Actions of R^n and Z^n (1972); Probabilistic Modal Inferences (1982)
- Doctoral advisor: George Mackey
- Influences: David Armstrong; David Stove

Academic work
- Discipline: Philosophy
- Sub-discipline: Epistemology; metaphysics; philosophy of physics; philosophy of religion
- Institutions: University of New England

Peter Richard Haddow Forrest FAHA (born 1948) is an Australian philosopher.

== Early life and education ==
Forrest was born in 1948 in Liverpool, England, and was educated at Ampleforth College. His undergraduate work was at Balliol College, Oxford, in mathematics, and he gained a Doctor of Philosophy (PhD) degree in mathematics from Harvard University. After moving to Australia he gained a Master of Arts degree in philosophy at the University of Tasmania, then in 1984 a PhD degree at the University of Sydney, where he was influenced by philosophers David Stove and David Armstrong. He was Professor of Philosophy at the University of New England from 1987 to 2010.

== Academic career ==
In the philosophy of religion, Forrest's books God Without the Supernatural and Developmental Theism defend a speculative view of God which resembles traditional theism in regarding God as an entity beyond the world, having creative powers, but also takes God not to violate natural laws and to develop from a state of pure power to a state of pure love.

In the philosophy of time, Forrest defends the growing block theory, according to which the present and the past are real, but not the future.

He was elected a Fellow of the Australian Academy of the Humanities in 1990; he is married with four children.

== Books ==
- 1986, The Dynamics of Belief: A Normative Logic, Oxford: Blackwell, ISBN 0631146199;
- 1988, Quantum Metaphysics, Oxford: Blackwell, ISBN 0631163719;
- 1996, God Without the Supernatural: A Defense of Scientific Theism, Ithaca, New York: Cornell University Press ISBN 978-1-876492-08-3;
- 2007, Developmental Theism: From Pure Will to Unbounded Love, Oxford: Clarendon Press, ISBN 9780199214587;
- 2012, The Necessary Structure of the All-Pervading Aether, Frankfurt: Ontos Verlag, ISBN 9783110325928.
- 2021, Intellectual, Humanist and Religious Commitment: Acts of Assent, London: Bloomsbury, ISBN 9781350097711
- 2025, The Essence of Catholicism, London: Bloomsbury, ISBN 9781350466449
