= Australasian Association of Philosophy =

- Established: 1922
- Mission: to promote philosophy in Australia, New Zealand, and Singapore
- President: Neil Levy
- Website: http://aap.org.au/

The Australasian Association of Philosophy (AAP) is the peak body for philosophy in Australasia. The chief purpose of the AAP is to promote philosophy in Australia, New Zealand, and Singapore. Among the means that it follows to achieve this end, the AAP runs an annual conference, publishes two journals, awards various prizes, sponsors postgraduate and undergraduate philosophical activities, maintains affiliations with numerous other organisations that aim to promote philosophy and philosophical activity, and promotes philosophy in schools, cafes, pubs, and everywhere else that philosophy may be found.

== History ==
The AAP was formed in 1922. Until 1958, it was as the Australasian Association of Psychology and Philosophy. The first issue of the journal appeared in 1923, and the first annual conference was held in Sydney in 1923.

When it was founded, the Association had a number of State branches in Australia, including a branch in Victoria and a branch in New South Wales. These state branches had all ceased functioning well before the close of the twentieth century.

A New Zealand Division of the Australasian Association of Philosophy (AAPNZ) was formally established in 1978. It was constituted by AAP members who were or had been active in New Zealand philosophy. The NZ Division held an Annual Conference in early December. The first such conference was held at Canterbury University College, Christchurch in 1953. AAPNZ was formally disestablished in 2011. The organisation of the Annual Conference in early December is now the responsibility of the New Zealand Association of Philosophy (NZAP). Singapore became a region of the AAP in 2002.

== Journals ==
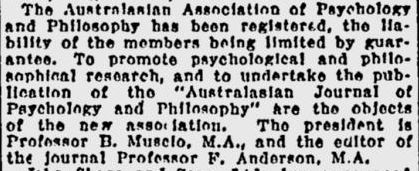
Sydney Morning Herald, Tuesday, 14 October 1924.

The AAP is responsible for the publication of Australasian Journal of Philosophy (AJP), which is Australasia's oldest philosophy journal. Various independent rankings list the AJP in the top ten generalist philosophy journals in the world.

The AAP is also launching a second journal, Australasian Philosophical Review (APR), the first issue of which is due to appear in July 2016.

Since 2019, the AAP has supported the Undergraduate Philosophy Journal of Australasia (UPJA), the first undergraduate journal of philosophy in the region.

== Conference ==
The association is responsible for the organisation of the annual AAP conference, which always commences on the first Sunday in July. Held over five days, this conference is designed to give professional philosophers the opportunity to present and discuss papers in all areas of philosophy. Each year it attracts up to 300 philosophers from all parts of the globe.

== Prizes ==
The AAP awards a number of annual prizes. These include:

- The AJP Best Paper Award for the best paper published in the Australasian Journal of Philosophy.
- The AAP Media Prize, for the best philosophical piece published by a professional philosopher in the popular media in Australasia.
- The AAP Media Professionals Prize, for the best contribution by a media professional to the promotion of philosophy in the popular media in Australasia.
- The AAP Innovation in Inclusive Curricula Prize, for the most innovative development of inclusive curriculum by professional philosophers working in Australasia.
- The AAP Philosothon Prize, for the best student contributions at the annual Australian Philosothon.

== Affiliations ==
The AAP maintains affiliations with FISP (Fédération Internationale des Sociétés de Philosophie), the APA (American Philosophical Association), the BPA (British Philosophical Association), the ACPA (L'Association canadienne de philosophie), FAPSA (Federation of Australasian Philosophy in Schools Associations), CHASS (Council for the Humanities, Arts and Social Sciences), and a range of Australasian philosophical associations that are devoted to particular sub-disciplines or sub-areas of philosophy.

== See also ==
- American Philosophical Association – Body encompassing professional philosophers in USA
- Australasian Journal of Philosophy
- Australian philosophy – Study of being on the continent
