= Hedda Hassel Mørch =

Norwegian philosopher

- Citizenship: Norwegian

Education
- Education: University of Oslo
- Thesis: Panpsychism and Causation: A New Argument and a Solution to the Combination Problem (2014)
- Doctoral advisor: Camilla Serck-Hanssen

Philosophical work
- Institutions: University of Inland Norway
- Main interests: Philosophy of mind, metaphysics
- Notable ideas: Phenomenal powers view; arguments for panpsychism from causation; work on the combination problem

Hedda Hassel Mørch (pronounced "Murk") is a Norwegian philosopher specializing in philosophy of mind and metaphysics. She is a professor at the University of Inland Norway. Her research concerns panpsychism, the metaphysics of causation, Russellian monism, the hard problem of consciousness, mental causation, personal identity, and integrated information theory (IIT).

Mørch received her PhD in philosophy from the University of Oslo in 2014. Her doctoral dissertation, Panpsychism and Causation: A New Argument and a Solution to the Combination Problem, defended panpsychism using an argument based on the nature of causation as experienced in agency and proposed a solution to the combination problem in panpsychism. She subsequently held postdoctoral positions involving the University of Oslo, the New York University Center for Mind, Brain and Consciousness, and the University of Wisconsin–Madison Center for Sleep and Consciousness.

== Academia ==
Mørch studied philosophy at the University of Oslo and completed her PhD there in 2014. Her dissertation examined panpsychism, causation and the combination problem. In subsequent research she developed arguments connecting theories of consciousness with the metaphysics of causation and causal powers.

She has held research positions at the University of Oslo, New York University and the University of Wisconsin–Madison. Her postdoctoral work at NYU was associated with the Center for Mind, Brain and Consciousness, co-directed by philosopher David Chalmers and neuroscientist Ned Block, while her work at Wisconsin was associated with the Center for Sleep and Consciousness.

Mørch is a professor in the Department of Law, Philosophy and International Studies at the University of Inland Norway in Lillehammer. PhilPeople lists metaphysics and philosophy of mind as her areas of specialization, with research interests including metaphysics of mind, theories of personal identity, Russellian monism, panpsychism, the combination problem, and dispositions and powers.

== Philosophical work ==
=== Panpsychism and the combination problem ===
A central theme of Mørch's work is panpsychism, the view that consciousness or phenomenal experience is associated with the fundamental constituents of reality. Her doctoral dissertation developed an argument for panpsychism from the experience of causation in agency with an argument drawing on a philosophical tradition associated with thinkers including Gottfried Wilhelm Leibniz, Arthur Schopenhauer and William James, while attempting to formulate a contemporary version of the argument.

The dissertation further addressed the combination problem: how complex conscious subjects could arise from simpler conscious constituents. Mørch proposed that mental combination could be understood as a causal process culminating in fusion, which she argued could avoid some of the standard difficulties associated with combining phenomenal subjects.

Mørch is a leading advocate of emergentist panpsychism, contrasted with constitutive panpsychism. Micro-level subjects fuse or merge to form a unified experience, much like droplets of water can fuse to form a larger drop, ceasing to exist as individuals post-fusion. Likewise, an emergent macro-subject replaces its base of micro-subjects, thereby avoiding epiphenomenalism and overdetermination, since the macro-subject replaces the base of micro-subjects as the locus of causal power.

Mørch suggests the fusion view may be combined with the integrated information theory of consciousness, which “entails a form of panpsychism.” According to Mørch, maximal Φ (phi) is a good candidate for the neural correlate of fusion.

=== Phenomenal powers ===
Mørch is a proponent of the phenomenal powers view, according to which conscious states necessitate their effects in virtue of how they feel. Her 2017 article "The Evolutionary Argument for Phenomenal Powers", published in Philosophical Perspectives, develops an argument connecting phenomenal properties with causal powers and evolutionary considerations.

She subsequently applied the phenomenal powers view to the meta-problem of consciousness, the problem of explaining why humans have the intuition that there is a hard problem of consciousness. In a 2020 article in the Journal of Consciousness Studies, Mørch argued that the phenomenal powers view could provide an answer to the meta-problem while avoiding some difficulties faced by other realist theories of consciousness.

Her related article "Does Dispositionalism Entail Panpsychism?" examines the relationship between dispositionalism about physical properties and panpsychism. Mørch argues that a version of dispositionalism combined with the phenomenal powers view can support the conclusion that dispositionalism entails panpsychism.

=== Integrated information theory ===
Mørch has written extensively about integrated information theory (IIT), a theory of consciousness developed principally by neuroscientist Giulio Tononi. Her 2017 article in Philosophy Now provided a non-technical introduction to IIT.

Her research has examined the relationship between IIT and Russellian panpsychism. In "Is the Integrated Information Theory of Consciousness Compatible with Russellian Panpsychism?" Mørch argues that IIT and Russellian panpsychism are not compatible in their existing forms because of what she calls the coarse-graining problem. She nevertheless considers modifications under which the two theories might be made compatible, potentially allowing IIT to contribute to a solution of the combination problem.

Mørch has further examined whether consciousness should be regarded as an intrinsic property in relation to IIT. In "Is Consciousness Intrinsic?: A Problem for the Integrated Information Theory", she argues that the apparent conflict between intrinsic consciousness and IIT is part of a broader trilemma involving intrinsicality, non-overlap and reductionism, and considers possible ways of resolving it.

=== Non-physicalist theories of consciousness ===
In 2023 Mørch published Non-physicalist Theories of Consciousness as an open-access volume in Cambridge University Press's Elements in Philosophy of Mind series. The book surveys dualism, idealism, phenomenalism, dual-aspect monism and panpsychism, and considers arguments both for and against physicalism.

=== Personal identity and ethical implications of panpsychism ===
Mørch has argued that panpsychism has immense ethical potential in addressing environmental concerns by weakening the distinction between humanity and nature, and in combatting egoism by weakening the distinction between oneself and others, if not dissolving it completely.

In a 2025 article for Nautilus, "Is Everyone the Same Person?", she discusses a view sometimes described as universalism or open individualism, according to which the ordinary distinction between individual selves may not capture the deepest structure of personal identity. In a 2024 article, "Does Panpsychism Mean That 'We Are All One?'", Mørch considered a related ethical question: whether panpsychism entails a conception of shared identity that would undermine egoism or the special concern normally given to one's own individual self. She distinguishes the metaphysical claim that things are associated with consciousness from stronger claims about numerical identity among conscious beings.

== Public engagement ==
In 2015, Mørch was awarded the King's Gold Medal by the University of Oslo for her doctoral dissertation. Mørch has written for general audiences about consciousness, panpsychism and the philosophy of mind. Her 2017 Nautilus article "Is Matter Conscious?" presented panpsychism as one response to what she described as a fundamental difficulty concerning the relationship between physical matter and conscious experience.

She has contributed to discussions of consciousness in publications including Scientific American, Nautilus, Philosophy Now, New Scientist and Popular Mechanics, as well as to podcasts and radio programs, such as Consciousness Live! and The Panpsycast. Her public work has addressed panpsychism, pandeism, IIT, and personal identity.
