= Neutral monism =

Philosophical view that mind and matter come from one neutral underlying reality

Neutral monism is an umbrella term for a class of metaphysical theories in the philosophy of mind, concerning the relation of mind to matter. These theories take the fundamental nature of reality to be neither mental nor physical; in other words it is "neutral".

Neutral monism has gained prominence as a potential solution to theoretical issues within the philosophy of mind, specifically the mind–body problem and the hard problem of consciousness. The mind–body problem is the problem of explaining how mind relates to matter. The hard problem is a related philosophical problem targeted at physicalist theories of mind specifically: the problem arises because it is not obvious how a purely physical universe could give rise to conscious experience. This is because physical explanations are mechanistic: that is, they explain phenomena by appealing to underlying functions and structures. And, though explanations of this sort seem to work well for a wide variety of phenomena, conscious experience seems uniquely resistant to functional explanations. As the philosopher David Chalmers has put it: "even when we have explained the performance of all the cognitive and behavioral functions in the vicinity of experience - perceptual discrimination, categorization, internal access, verbal report - there may still remain a further unanswered question: Why is the performance of these functions accompanied by experience?".

With this, there has been growing demand for alternative ontologies (such as neutral monism) that may provide explanatory frameworks more suitable for explaining the existence of consciousness. It has been accepted by several prominent English-speaking philosophers, such as William James and Bertrand Russell.

== Relations to other theories ==
A diagram showing the relationship between neutral monism and three other philosophical theories. Elements within the solid lines are fundamental, whereas elements within the dotted lines are non-fundamental.

Since neutral monism provides a potential solution to theoretical problems in the philosophy of mind, it helps to situate neutral monism against its competitors (that is, alternative solutions offered to the same problems). These competing frameworks can be identified by the relationship they draw between mind and matter, and which of the two they take to be more fundamental.

Note that their 'fundamental' is here being used as a technical term. An entity is fundamental if and only if it is irreducible to any other entities. For example, a birthday cake is not fundamental because it can be reduced to its ingredients; a lego-house is not fundamental because it can be reduced to its constituent lego pieces; and a corporation is not fundamental because it can be reduced to its various buildings, employees, and so forth. In contrast, the fundamental interactions of physics are fundamental because they cannot be reduced to any lower-level physical interactions.

Similarly, what is at stake within the philosophy of mind is whether reality has mental properties (such as conscious experience) as fundamental properties. Physicalists would deny this, and insist that consciousness and all mental properties are derivable from some lower-level physical properties (similar to how the properties of water are derivable from H_{2}O). Idealists, in contrast, believe reality is fundamentally mental, and that physical things are nothing more than mind-dependant perceptions. Dualists play both side of the aisle as they believe that reality consists of both fundamentally mental and fundamentally physical elements, each irreducible to the other. Then there are panpsychists, who believe that everything is both mental and physical (consciousness is what reality looks like 'from the inside' and the physical world is what reality looks like 'from the outside'). Neutral monists break this mold by claiming that the fundamental elements of reality are neither physical nor mental.

=== Dualism ===
Neutral monism is similar to dualism in that both take reality to have both mental and physical properties irreducible to one another. Unlike dualism however, neutral monism does not take these properties to be fundamental or separate from one another from any meaningful sense. Dualism is the view that reality is, broadly speaking, made up of two distinct substances or properties: physical substances/properties and mental substances/properties. Neutral monism, in contrast, takes both mind and matter to supervene on a neutral third substance, which is neither mental nor physical. According to Baruch Spinoza, the mind and the body are dual aspects of Nature or God, which he identified as the only real substance.

While schematic differences and neutral monism are quite stark, contemporary conceptions of the theories overlap in certain key areas. For instance, Chalmers (1996) maintains that the difference between neutral monism and his preferred property dualism can, at times, be mostly semantic.

=== Panpsychism ===
Panpsychism is a class of theories that believe that all physical things are conscious. John Searle distinguished it from neutral monism as well as property dualism, which he identified as a form of dualism. However, some neutral monist theories are panpsychist and some panpsychist theories are neutral monist. However, the two do not always overlap. For instance, Russellian monism is not panpsychism in response to the combination problem. Conversely, some versions of property dualism are panpsychist, but not neutral monistic.

== History ==
=== Antecedents ===
Early examples of neutral monism are found in Indian philosophy. Baruch Spinoza and David Hume provided accounts of reality that may also be interpreted as neutral monism. Spinoza's metaphysics in Ethics argues for a monistic worldview, as well as a neutral one where body and mind are the same. H. H. Price argues that Hume's empiricism introduces a "neutral monist theory of sensation" as both "matter and mind are constructed out of sense-data".

In the late 19th century, physicist Ernst Mach theorized that physical entities are nothing apart from their perceived mental properties. Mach ultimately surmises that "both object and ego are provisional fictions of the same kind".

=== Early 20th century ===
William James propounded the notion of radical empiricism to advance neutral monism in his essay "Does Consciousness Exist?" in 1904 (reprinted in Essays in Radical Empiricism in 1912). William James was one of the earliest philosophers to fully articulate a complete neutral monist view of the world. He did so largely in reaction to neo-Kantianism, which was prevalent at the time.

A convert of James, Bertrand Russell advocated for neutral monism, coining the term itself. Russell expressed interest in neutral monism early on his career, and officially endorsed the view from 1919 onward, at least until 1927, when The Analysis of Matter appeared. The ontology of neutral monism conformed to the "supreme maxim in scientific philosophising", as Russell put it in "Logical Atomism" in 1924. Russell's conception of neutral monism went through a number of versions through his career. Russell's own brand of neutral monism, at whichever stage, can be referred to as Russell's neutral monism, but Russellian monism tends to refer to Russell's adherence to the causal theory of perception on the one hand, and the data of consciousness on the other, the latter reduced to neurological events. This view is actually materialist, which neutral monism is not. The version of 1919-1927 is however compatible with logical atomism, Russel's earlier ontology. His position was contentious among his contemporaries; G.E Moore maintained that Russell's philosophy was flawed due to a misinterpretation of facts (e.g. the concept of acquaintance).

Neutral monism about the mind–body relationship is described by historian C. D. Broad in The Mind and Its Place in Nature. Broad's list of possible views about the mind–body problem, which became known simply as "Broad's famous list of 1925" (see chapter XIV of Broad's book) states the basis of what this theory had been and was to become. Whately Carington in his book Matter, Mind, and Meaning (1949) advocated a form of neutral monism. He held that mind and matter both consist of the same kind of components known as "cognita" or sense data. Russian psychologist Boris Sidis also appears to have adhered to some form of neutral monism.

=== Present ===
David Chalmers has been known to express sympathy toward neutral monism. In The Conscious Mind (1996) he concludes that facts about consciousness are "further facts about our world" and that there ought to be more to reality than just the physical. He then goes on to engage with a Platonic rendition of neutral monism that holds information as fundamental. Though Chalmers believes neutral monism and panpsychism ought to be taken seriously, he considers the combination problem to be point of concern. He considers Russell's solution of "protophenominal properties" to be ad hoc, and thinks such speculation undercuts the parsimony that made neutral monism initially appealing.

According to Stephen Stich and Ted Warfield, neutral monism has not been a popular view in philosophy as it is difficult to develop or understand the nature of the neutral elements. Nevertheless, a Machian version of the view has been defended by Jonathan Westphal in The Mind–Body Problem, 2016.

== Arguments in favour ==
Russell was attracted to neutral monism due to its parsimony. In his view, neutral monism offered an "immense simplification" for metaphysics. The upshot of this is that neutral monism provides a solution to the hard problem of consciousness. Annaka Harris formulated the hard problem as "how experience arises out of non-sentient matter"; the neutral monist solves the problem by arguing that if matter is neutral and contains some level of sentience, then one has perceptual contact with the world without needing to explain how experience mysteriously arises from physical matter.

An account for how this works relies on creating a distinction between extrinsic properties and intrinsic properties. Extrinsic properties are properties that exist by virtue of how they interact the world and are outwardly observable, such as structures and form. Intrinsic properties are properties exist by virtue of the way they are and are not necessarily outwardly observable. (Note: If it helps, extrinsic properties can be thought of as "symptoms" and intrinsic properties can be thought of as a "disease". This analogy breaks down fairly quickly, however.) Astrophysicist Arthur Eddington notes that physics can only provide metrical indicators but tells us nothing about the intrinsic nature of things. In other words, most of the positive claims in science are related to the extrinsic properties of reality; that is, with their relationships. However, just because the intrinsic properties of matter are unknown does not mean they do not exist, and in fact may be required. (Note: Though there some radical Platonists, such as Max Tegmark, who believe reality has no intrinsic properties. By Tegmark's account, the universe is made of math without anything to ground it.) As Chalmers puts it, a world of "pure causal flux" may be logically impossible, for there is "nothing for causation to relate."

Extrapolating from this, philosopher Philip Goff argues in Galileo's Error (2019) that consciousness may be the only feature of the universe that we are certain of. It cannot be seen through extrinsic signatures (as is evidenced by the problem of other minds), but we know from first-hand experience that it exists. So if (1) consciousness is the only intrinsic property of matter there is evidence for, and (2) matter must necessarily have intrinsic properties, then one can inductively infer that all matter has intrinsic conscious properties.

== Arguments against ==
While neutral monism presents a novel approach to the mind-body problem, it must navigate a complex web of objections and reconcile its tenets with the consciousness combination, reductionist, materialist, mentalist, the problem of experience, and emergence to establish its viability as a solution.

Critics of neutral monism, which addresses the mind-body problem, frequently identify the "combination problem" as its most significant challenge. Neutral monism argues that the mind and body are two aspects of the same underlying, neutral substance. In this framework, micro-entities possess basic conscious experiences, leading to questions about how these experiences amalgamate to form complex human consciousness. A major point of contention is the mechanics of combination. Sam Coleman specifically argues that the notion of subject-summing is inherently incoherent. He posits that if two distinct viewpoints, A and B, were to merge into an "uber-mind," this entity would paradoxically need to encompass A's experiences without B's and vice versa, while still maintaining a unified experience, a scenario that appears contradictory. On the other hand, Galen Strawson suggests that the solution to this conundrum might lie in yet unresolved aspects of consciousness. He implies that our current understanding of consciousness is incomplete, and that further exploration could potentially unravel how the subject-summing problem could logically occur, providing a resolution to the combination problem central to neutral monism.

Expanding upon this criticism, neutral monism grapples with the dilemma of reduction versus elimination. The theory grapples with the ontological status of entities it seeks to reduce: are they merely simplified or entirely eliminated? This debate is integral to understanding neutral monism's approach to traditional concepts like “mind” and “matter.” Ernst Mach exemplified this dilemma by proposing that entities such as "body" and "ego" are not fixed unities but rather provisional constructs or composites of more tightly interlinked elements. This suggests a fluidity in the conceptualization of these entities, oscillating between them being useful fictions and complex combinations of more fundamental parts. Similarly, Bertrand Russell advocated for the elimination of traditional psychological terms like "knowledge," "memory," "perception," and "sensation" from our vocabulary, as he believed they did not accurately represent the underlying reality. In his view, traditional dualist and materialist conceptions of mind and matter were inadequate. Instead, Russell proposed neutral constructions to replace these entities, which, though devoid of traditional properties like solidity or inherent object-reference, were designed to fulfill similar roles.

Bertrand Russell proposed protophenomenal properties to address this issue. These properties, as basic, non-mental, and non-physical, are meant to underlie both mental and physical phenomena, thereby bridging the gap between mind and matter. However, David Chalmers criticizes this approach as being ad hoc, questioning whether these differ sufficiently from physicalism. Contemporary interpretations of neutral monism, such as those by Gregory Landini and Erik Banks, further complicate this distinction. Landini argues that Russell's transient particulars are physical entities foundational to mental and physical continuants, while Banks' "realistic empiricism" suggests a physicalist interpretation of these basic entities. Additionally, Donovan Wishon observes a later shift in Russell's work towards a materialistic ontology, indicating that the mental-physical distinction may be rooted more in our methods of knowledge acquisition than in intrinsic properties. These developments challenge the central neutral monist assertion that reality's fundamental constituents are neither purely mental nor physical, suggesting that the conceptual gap between neutral monism and physicalism may be narrower than previously thought.

The suspicion of mentalism also looms over neutral monism. The critics, such as Lenin and Ayer, argue that these remain fundamentally mentalistic, thus undermining the neutrality claim. Although traditional neutral monists removed mentalistic connotations from sensations and experiences, the charge of mentalism remains a point of contention.

Additionally, the problem of experience persists. Critics like Chalmers and Strawson argue that neutral monism, like materialism, fails to accommodate experience, suggesting a gap between qualities and the awareness of them. Traditional neutral monists respond by arguing that appropriate relationships among qualities can lead to awareness, although the debate continues.

The notion of emergence further complicates the picture. The concept of emergence, particularly the distinctions between weak, strong, and radical emergence as outlined by Chalmers, bring up challenges. While neutral monism comfortably accommodates weak emergence, where novel phenomena unexpectedly arise from known domains, it struggles with strong and radical emergence, the latter involving novel features in complex systems not fully grounded in their components. For instance, Landini suggests that Russell's later work implies a radical emergence of qualia, a position not universally accepted.

== Variants ==
=== Radical empiricism ===
This form of neutral monism was formulated by William James. It was done mostly in response to his colleagues dismissal of its rank "among first principles". Consciousness, in William James perspective, is the epistemic foundation upon which all other knowledge rests; if an ontology is incompatible with its existence, then it is the ontology that must be dismissed, not consciousness. William James considered "the perceived and the perceiver" to simply be two sides of the same coin.

=== Russellian monism ===
Russellian monism most famously differs from other views of neutral monism in its proposed solution to the combination problem. Russell proposes the existence of "paraphenomenal" properties, that may give rise to consciousness when organised in a certain way.

=== Platonism ===
Not all Platonic theories are neutral monist, but some neutral monist theories are Platonic. Platonic versions of neutral monism have become more prevalent in recent decades. According to these views, the 'neutral' substance that reality are Platonic forms, or something similar. Though these views vary in the details, they usually take a form similar to more common forms of radical Platonism such as the Mathematical Universe Hypothesis (the view that reality is fundamentally made up of mathematics, which is neither physical nor mental). That said, these theories often suffer from the same problems as physicalist theories of mind, since the existence of Platonic forms, mathematical objects, and the like, are not on their own sufficient to explain the emergence of conscious experience.

Some may also find Platonism appealing thanks to its parsimony: logical truths may necessarily exist, and the mental and physical are mere consequences of this necessary existence. These theories also have the advantage of having coherently defined the neutral variable, thus having overcome what's long been a major challenge for neutral monism.

== See also ==
- Dialectical monism
- Double-aspect theory
- Monadology
- Panpsychism
- Philosophy of mind
- Unus mundus

== Sources ==
- "Monism". Columbia Encyclopedia. Columbia University Press. 2008. Archived from the original on 2011-06-06.
- Erik C. Banks. (2014). The Realistic Empiricism of Mach, James, and Russell: Neutral Monism Reconceived. Cambridge University Press.
- Erik C. Banks. (2010). Neutral Monism Reconsidered. Philosophical Psychology 23: 173–187.
- David Chalmers (1996) The Conscious Mind: In Search of a Fundamental Theory, Oxford University Press, New York, ISBN 0-19-511789-1 (Pbk.)
- David Chalmers ed. (2002) Philosophy of Mind: Classical and Contemporary Readings, Oxford University Press, New York, ISBN 0-19-514581-X (pbk. : alk. paper).
- Andrew Gluck (2007) Damasio's Error and Descartes' Truth: An Inquiry into Epistemology, Metaphysics, and Consciousness, University of Scranton Press, Scranton PA, ISBN 978-1-58966-127-1 ((pb)).
- Bertrand Russell (1921) The Analysis of Mind, republished 2005 by Dover Publications, Inc., Mineola, NY, ISBN 0-486-44551-8 (pbk.)
