= William Seager =

William Seager may refer to:

- William Seager (philosopher) (born 1952), Canadian philosopher
- William Seager (businessman) (1862–1941), Welsh shipping magnate and Liberal Party politician
