= Donald D. Hoffman =

American cognitive psychologist and popular science author

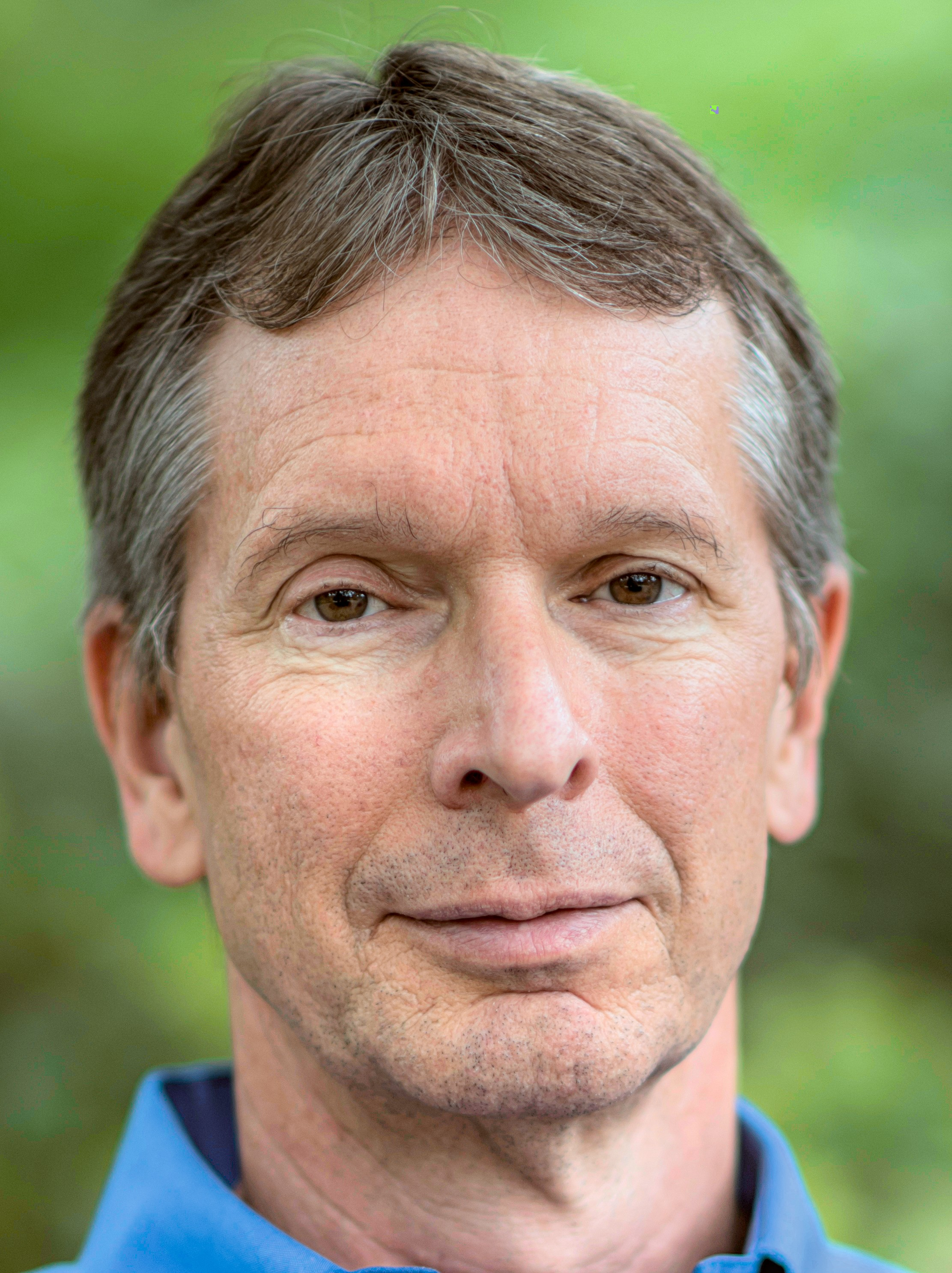
- Born: December 29, 1955 (age 70); San Antonio, Texas, United States
- Education: University of California, Los Angeles (B.A. 1978); Massachusetts Institute of Technology (PhD 1983)
- Scientific career
- Fields: Cognitive science

Donald David Hoffman (born December 29, 1955) is an American cognitive psychologist and popular science author. He is a professor emeritus in the Department of Cognitive Sciences at the University of California, Irvine (UCI).

Hoffman studies consciousness, visual perception, and evolutionary psychology using mathematical models and psychophysical experiments. His research subjects include facial attractiveness, the recognition of shape, the perception of motion and color, the evolution of perception, and the mind–body problem. He has co-authored two technical books; Observer Mechanics: A Formal Theory of Perception (1989) offers a theory of consciousness and its relationship to physics; Automotive Lighting and Human Vision (2005) applies vision science to vehicle lighting. His book Visual Intelligence: How We Create What We See (1998) presents the modern science of visual perception to a broad audience.

His 2015 TED Talk, "Do we see reality as it is?" argues that our perceptions have evolved to hide reality from us. He followed this up with a book in 2019, The Case Against Reality: How Evolution Hid the Truth from Our Eyes. In 2026 he co-founded Trace Institute.

== Biography ==
Donald Hoffman being interviewed for the Dutch TV show The Mind of the Universe.

Hoffman received a Bachelor of Arts degree in quantitative psychology from the University of California, Los Angeles (UCLA) in 1978, and earned his Doctorate of Philosophy in computational psychology at the Massachusetts Institute of Technology (MIT) in 1983 under David Marr and Whitman Richards. He was briefly a Research Scientist at the Artificial Intelligence Laboratory of MIT, and then became an assistant professor at the UCI in 1983. He has remained on the faculty of UCI since then, with a sabbatical during the 1995-1996 academic year at the Zentrum für Interdisziplinäre Forschung of Bielefeld University.

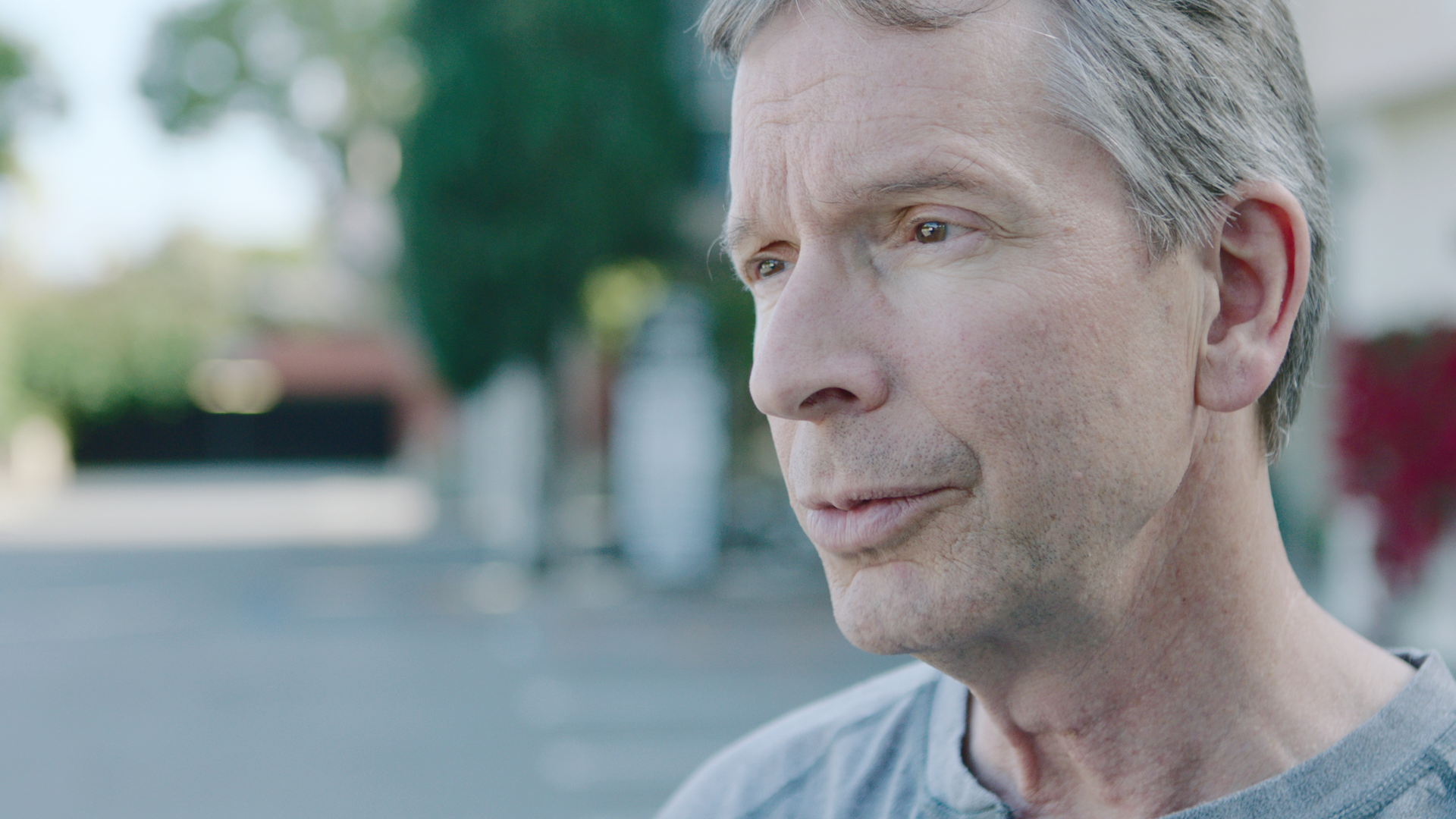
Donald D. Hoffman

Hoffman has been married twice, secondly to Geralyn Souza.

== Work on consciousness ==
=== Introduction and overview ===
Hoffman notes that the commonly held view that brain activity causes conscious experience has, so far, proved to be intractable in terms of scientific explanation. Hoffman proposes a solution to the hard problem of consciousness by adopting the converse view that consciousness causes brain activity and, in fact, creates all objects and properties of the physical world. To this end, Hoffman has developed and combined two theories: the "multimodal user interface" (MUI) theory of perception and "conscious realism".

=== Multimodal user interface (MUI) theory ===
MUI theory states that "perceptual experiences do not match or approximate properties of the objective world, but instead provide a simplified, species-specific, user interface to that world." Hoffman argues that conscious beings have not evolved to perceive the world as it actually is, but have evolved to perceive the world in a way that maximizes "fitness payoffs". Hoffman uses the metaphor of a computer's desktop environment and its icons – the icons of a computer desktop provide a functional interface so that the user does not have to deal with the underlying programming and electronics in order to use the computer efficiently. Similarly, objects that human beings perceive in time and space are metaphorical icons that act as their interface to the world and enable them to function as efficiently as possible without having to deal with the overwhelming amount of data underlying reality. This theory implies epiphysicalism; i.e., physical objects, such as quarks and brains and stars, are constructed by conscious agents but such physical objects have no causal power. While panpsychism claims that rocks, mountains, the moon, etc. are conscious, "Conscious Realism" in this theory (Multimodal user interface theory) does not. Instead, what it claims is all such objects are icons within the user interface of a conscious agent, but that does not entail the claim that the objects themselves are conscious.

=== The interface theory of perception ===
The interface theory of perception is the theory that human beings' perceptual experiences don't necessarily map onto what exists in the reality of itself. This is in contrast to the popular view of critical realism, which argues that some of their perceptual experiences map onto the reality of the natural world. In the critical realist's view, primary qualities like height and weight represent actual qualities of reality, whereas secondary qualities don't. Within the interface theory of perception, neither primary nor secondary qualities necessarily map onto reality. Hoffman used evolutionary game theory to argue that natural selection favors organisms that perceive their surroundings in ways that improve survival rather than accurately represent reality. He compared human perception to a computer desktop, explaining that what people see is a simplified representation of a more complex world.

=== Conscious realism ===
Conscious realism is described as a non-physicalist monism which holds that consciousness is the primary reality and the physical world emerges from that. The objective world consists of conscious agents and their experiences. "What exists in the objective world, independent of my perceptions, is a world of conscious agents, not a world of unconscious particles and fields. Those particles and fields are icons in the MUIs of conscious agents but are not themselves fundamental denizens of the objective world. Consciousness is fundamental."

=== Perception of the physical world is a byproduct of consciousness ===
Together, MUI theory and Conscious Realism form the foundation for an overall theory that the physical world is not objective but is an epiphenomenon (secondary phenomenon) caused by consciousness. Hoffman has said that some form of reality may exist, but may be completely different from the reality our brains model and perceive. Reality may not be made of space-time and physical objects. Through supposing that consciousness is fundamental, Hoffman provides a possible solution to the hard problem of consciousness, which wrestles with the notion of why we seem to have conscious immediate experiences, and how sentient beings could arise from seemingly non-sentient matter. Hoffman argues that consciousness is more fundamental than the objects and patterns perceived by consciousness. We have conscious experiences because consciousness is posited as a fundamental aspect of reality. The problem of how sentient beings arise from seemingly non-sentient matter is also addressed because it alters the notion of non-sentient matter. Perceptions of non-sentient matter are mere byproducts of consciousness and don't necessarily reflect reality. This means the causal notion of non-sentient matter developing into sentient beings is open to question.

=== Implications from evolution ===
Hoffman argues that natural selection is necessarily directed toward fitness payoffs and that organisms develop internal models of reality that increase these fitness payoffs. This means that organisms develop a perception of the world that is directed towards fitness, and not of reality. This led him to argue that evolution has developed sensory systems in organisms that have high fitness but don't offer a correct perception of reality.

== Books ==
- Observer Mechanics: A Formal Theory of Perception (1989)
- Visual Intelligence: How We Create What We See (1998)
- Automotive Lighting and Human Vision (2005)
- The Case Against Reality: How Evolution Hid the Truth from Our Eyes (2019)

== See also ==
- Idealism
- Panpsychism
- Yogachara
- Advaita Vedanta

== Sources ==
- Hoffman, Donald (2015), Do We See Reality As It Is?
- Hoffman, Donald D. (2019). The Case Against Reality: Why Evolution Hid the Truth From Our Eyes (1st ed.). New York. ISBN 978-0-393-25469-3. OCLC 1054001128.
- Automotive lighting and human vision. Wördenweber, Burkard. Berlin: Springer. 2007. ISBN 9783540366973. OCLC 185022114.
- Bennett, Bruce M. (1989). Observer mechanics : a formal theory of perception. Hoffman, Donald D., Prakash, Chetan. San Diego: Academic Press. ISBN 0120886359. OCLC 19590702.
- Hoffman, Donald (2008). "Conscious Realism and the Mind-Body Problem". Mind and Matter. 6 (1): 87–121.
- Hoffman, Donald D. (1998). Visual intelligence : how we create what we see (1st ed.). New York: W.W. Norton. ISBN 0393046699. OCLC 38542585.
- Hoffman, Donald D.; Singh, Manish; Prakash, Chetan (December 2015). "Probing the interface theory of perception: Reply to commentaries". Psychonomic Bulletin & Review. 22 (6): 1551–1576. doi:10.3758/s13423-015-0931-3. ISSN 1069-9384. PMID 26424222. S2CID 30638235.
- Hoffman, Donald D.; Singh, Manish; Prakash, Chetan (December 2015). "The Interface Theory of Perception". Psychonomic Bulletin & Review. 22 (6): 1480–1506. doi:10.3758/s13423-015-0890-8. ISSN 1069-9384. PMID 26384988. S2CID 2071376.
- Hoffman Donald D.; Prakash, Chetan; Chattopadhyay, Swapan (May 2023) Conscious Agents and the Subatomic World
