= Ontopoetics =

Philosophical concept

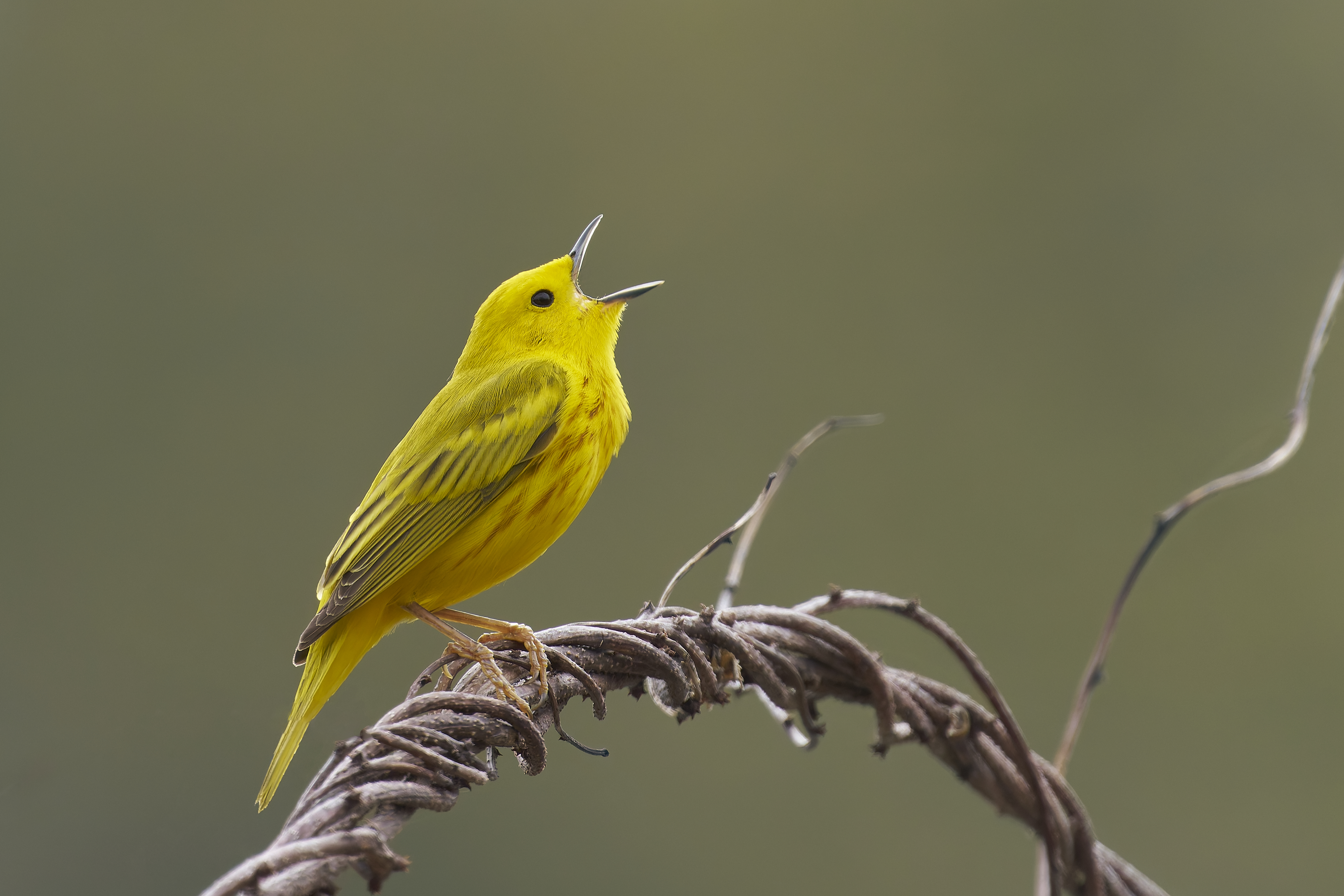
Aside from human signals and expressions, ontopoetics also looks into symmetries and poetic infrastructure produced by nature (such as birdsong) and the construction of imaginary situations by certain species.

Ontopoetics is a philosophical concept that involves the communicative engagement of self with the world and the world with the self. It is also described as a "poetic order" that unfolds alongside the "causal order" in the process of the communicative engagement with reality and participating in it. It includes the perception of cues or signals, or the expression of actors, as well as "the construction of impressions on re-actors by the deliberate choice of attractive signifiers that communicate factual or illusory realities".

Ontopoetics is not considered a theory but a view of reality and an understanding of the world as a communicative presence.

== Concept ==
Ontopoetics is derived from the Greek words ontos ("that which is" - "I am" or "being") and poiesis ("coming into being" - creation" or "bringing forth"). It is also noted that the poetic element to the concept connotes a complexity that embraces diversity of experiences so that those that do not lie within the bounds of one's tradition are not rejected or denied. The concept also includes the manner by which humans respond to the symmetries around them. It is distinguished from panpsychism in the sense that it does not merely claim that the world is psychoactive but that it is responsive to us so that it can be called forth if engaged on an expressive plane, one of meaning and not merely of causation. According to Freya Mathews, the occurrence of meaningful communicative exchanges between self and the world and world and self allows a glimpse of the inner, psychoactive dimension that is inherent in materiality but occluded by materialism.

As a concept, ontopoetics looks into the creative relationship between things and focuses on the poetic infrastructure of creation (e.g. order of an insect, structure of a seed, or the composition of a bird song). Aside from the cues, expressions, or signifiers made to communicate realities, ontopoetics also covers the "construction of imaginary situations by certain species" such as animal cheating, mimicking, and playing.

Ontopoetics holds that the world is not only object-domain as represented by physics but is also "a field of meaning". According to Mathews, this understanding of the world allows for unmasking of realities and experience that are not familiar or known to science. This is attributed to the manner by which the paradigm produces a more dynamic and responsive self and poetic voice as experience and knowledge are directed by receptiveness, playfulness, and openness across human-nature divisions. The idea is that conceptual intelligence cannot access a depth of reality because it tends to trivialize it. This is also the case for possibilities of experience that are routinely open but are taken for granted. In ontopoetics, a painting or a poem can capture reality better than common language or common perception because these apprehend it in its irreducible essence. In addition, these artworks are said to also coincide with metaphysical intuition.

Ontopoetics argues for a model of ontological plurality. It suggests that all truths and realities are potentially but not exclusively true and real. In the Will to Power, where Nietzsche argued for the impossibility of truth, it was maintained that "there are no facts, only interpretations." Ontopoetics stands in opposition to global perspectives (e.g. atomism and economism) due to its focus on field-concordance between psyche, meaning, and cosmos. It has been described as a fresh conception of the Cartesian split of external appearance and reality, problematizing it through a dialogic consciousness or poetics as ontology.

Another conceptualization frames ontopoetics as a critique founded on the idea that the expression of being beyond what is representationally constructed as reality leads to the philosophical thought on art.

== Friedrich Nietzsche ==
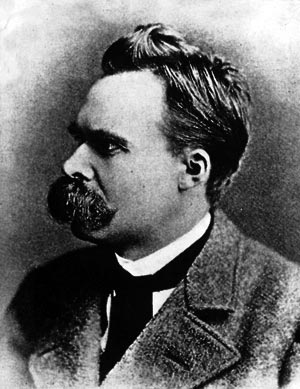
Friedrich Nietzsche used ontopoetics in his deconstruction of truth.

Friedrich Nietzsche proposed that the world and existence are aesthetic phenomena in his deconstruction of truth. Ontopoetics is part of this aesthetic metaphysics of the world and the metaphysical aesthetics of art where the work of God as the artist-creator and its representation in the work of art are distinguished as first and second levels, respectively. These perspectives would later influence aspects of the philosophy of thinkers such as Martin Heidegger and Gilles Deleuze.

The application of the Nietzschean ontopoetics to art is based on a conceptualization of reality that includes elements hidden behind a "veil" created by the interplay of institutions and false needs. Art in this case articulates what the veil hides. Ontopoetics has also influenced a group of artists identified as concretists, who emphasize ontopoetic issues in their art, particularly when relating reality in itself. It is also evident in the works of Marcel Duchamp, which featured the notion of "event" and the application of "analogy" in his sculptures. His art took into consideration the onto-epistemic dynamics that lurk behind manmade structure-events, which invite the spectator to make the next move based on an analogy, assumption, or deduction. Ontopoetics in this approach is considered a constitutive and creative step.

== Martin Heidegger ==
Heidegger maintained that truth can never be extracted from 'the sheer "not" of beings'. He subscribed to the Nietzschean idea that the world is a phenomenon that informs the ontopoetic conception of history. He maintained that the poetic is a type of unfolding of historical existence instead of cultural achievement. In his ontopoetics, there is also the conceptualization that art does not prioritize a preference for aesthetics but focuses on the happening of being where being takes place in the midst of beings. The poetic phenomenon called the Heideggerian Mit-da ("with-there") is said to illustrate the thinker's perspective concerning the anxiety of knowledge. Here, ontopoetics, as the rhythmic dimension of reality in knowledge, has an emotional opening of the word that finds the company of the world "on the edge of existence".
