= Freya Mathews =

Australian philosopher

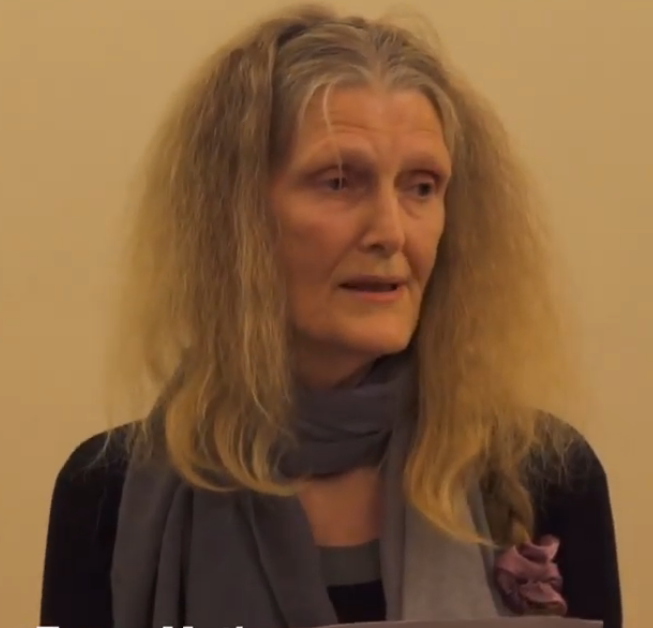
Freya Mathews in 2018

Freya Mathews FAHA is an Australian environmental philosopher whose main work has been in the areas of ecological metaphysics and panpsychism. Her current special interests are in ecological civilization; indigenous (Australian and Chinese) perspectives on "sustainability" and how these perspectives may be adapted to the context of contemporary global society; panpsychism and critique of the metaphysics of modernity; and wildlife ethics and rewilding in the context of the Anthropocene.

Mathews has been teaching in Australian universities since 1979. She currently holds the post of Adjunct Professor of Environmental Philosophy at La Trobe University. Mathews is the author of several books and over seventy articles on ecological philosophy, metaphysics, epistemology, ethics, and politics. In addition to her research activities she manages a private biodiversity reserve in northern Victoria, Australia. She is a fellow of the Australian Academy of the Humanities.

== Works ==
Mathews's philosophy features a holistic approach to environmental ethics with a metaphysical basis. Particularly, she draws from Baruch Spinoza's notion of "ethic of interconnectedness", which treats the features of the natural world as attributes of the same underlying substance. Her advocacy of ontopoetics, which she described as meaningful communicative exchanges between self and the world, is an aspect to this philosophical view. She also promotes a kind of ecocentrism to address and sustain inconvenient, and time-consuming conservation practice.

== Selected publications ==
- The Ecological Self, Routledge, London, 1991. Reissued 1993; paperback 1994
- For Love of Matter: A Contemporary Panpsychism, SUNY Press, Albany, 2003
- Journey to the Source of the Merri, Ginninderra Press, Canberra, 2003
- Reinhabiting Reality: Towards a Recovery of Culture, SUNY Press, Albany, 2005
- Ardea: a Philosophical Novella, Punctum Books, New York, 2016
- Without Animals Life is not Worth Living, Ginninderra Press, Adelaide, 2016

== See also ==
- Deep Ecology
- Panpsychism
- Sigurd Zienau
