= Panpsychism =

Philosophical view that consiousness is a ubiquitous feature of reality

In philosophy, panpsychism (/pænˈsaɪkɪzəm/) is the view that mind or conscious experience, of some type or other, is a fundamental and ubiquitous feature of reality, including all physical matter. It is one of the oldest theories in the philosophy of mind and metaphysics, possibly overlapping in some interpretations with the animism of many indigenous societies, which is traditionally characterized as a more spiritual or religious worldview.

Panpsychism has been attributed to certain ancient Indian philosophies, such as Jainism and Advaita Vedanta, as well as to Western philosophers including Spinoza, Margaret Cavendish, Leibniz, William James, and, more controversially, to Thales, Plato, Schopenhauer, Alfred North Whitehead, and Bertrand Russell. Views described as panpsychism were advocated by prominent 19th-century philosophers such as Schopenhauer and James, but saw a decline in the mid-20th century associated with the rise of logical positivism. Recent interest in the hard problem of consciousness and developments in the fields of neuroscience, psychology, and quantum mechanics have revived interest in panpsychism in the 21st century, because it addresses the hard problem directly.

== Overview ==
=== Etymology ===
The term panpsychism comes from the Greek pan (πᾶν: "all, everything, whole") and psyche (ψυχή: "soul, mind"). The use of "psyche" is controversial, because it is synonymous with "soul", a term usually taken to refer to something supernatural; more common terms now found in the literature include mind, mental properties, mental aspect, and experience.

=== Concept ===
Panpsychism holds that mind, or a mind-like aspect, is a fundamental and ubiquitous feature of reality. It is sometimes defined as a theory in which "the mind is a fundamental feature of the world which exists throughout the universe". Panpsychists posit that qualities of our own experience are present, in some form, in a wide range of natural bodies. This notion has taken on a wide variety of forms. Some historical and non-Western panpsychists ascribe attributes such as life or spirits to all entities (animism). Contemporary academic proponents, however, hold that sentience or subjective experience is ubiquitous, while distinguishing these qualities from more complex human mental attributes. They therefore ascribe a primitive form of mentality to entities at the fundamental level of physics, but may not ascribe mentality to most aggregate things, such as rocks or buildings.

=== Terminology ===
The philosopher David Chalmers, who has explored panpsychism as a viable theory, distinguishes between microphenomenal experiences (the experiences of microphysical entities), and macrophenomenal experiences (the experiences of larger entities, such as humans).

Philip Goff draws a distinction between panexperientialism and pancognitivism. In the form of panpsychism under discussion in the contemporary literature, conscious experience is present everywhere at a fundamental level, hence the term panexperientialism. Pancognitivism, by contrast, is the view that thought is present everywhere at a fundamental level—a view that had some historical advocates but has no present-day academic adherents. Contemporary panpsychists do not believe microphysical entities have complex mental states, such as beliefs, desires, and fears.

Originally, the term panexperientialism had a narrower meaning, having been coined by David Ray Griffin to refer specifically to the form of panpsychism used in process philosophy (see below).

== History ==
=== Antiquity ===
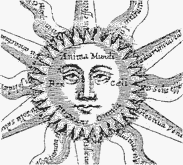
Illustration of the Neoplatonic concept of the anima mundi emanating from The Absolute, in some ways a precursor to modern panpsychism

Panpsychist views are a staple in pre-Socratic Greek philosophy. According to Aristotle, Thales (c. 624 – 545 BCE), the first Greek philosopher, posited a theory which held "that everything is full of gods". Thales believed that magnets demonstrated this. This has been interpreted as a panpsychist doctrine. Other Greek thinkers associated with panpsychism include Anaxagoras (who saw the unifying principle or arche as nous or mind), Anaximenes (who saw the arche as pneuma or spirit), and Heraclitus (who said "The thinking faculty is common to all").

Plato argues for panpsychism in his Sophist, in which he writes that all things participate in the form of Being, and that it must have a psychic aspect of mind and soul (psyche). In the Philebus and Timaeus, Plato argues for the idea of a world soul or anima mundi. According to Plato:

This world is indeed a living being endowed with a soul and intelligence ... a single visible living entity containing all other living entities, which by their nature are all related.

Stoicism developed a cosmology that held that the natural world is infused with the divine fiery essence pneuma, directed by the universal intelligence logos. The relationship between beings' individual logos, and the universal logos was a central concern of the Roman Stoic Marcus Aurelius. The metaphysics of Stoicism finds connections with Hellenistic philosophies, such as Neoplatonism. Gnosticism also made use of the Platonic idea of anima mundi.

=== Renaissance ===
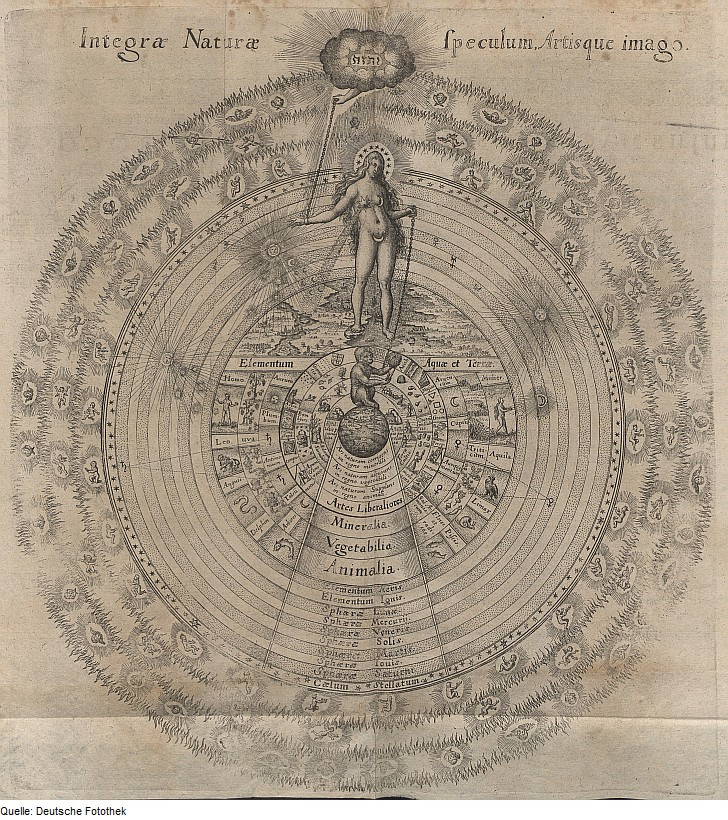
Illustration of the Cosmic order by Robert Fludd, where the World soul is depicted as a woman

After Emperor Justinian closed Plato's Academy in 529 CE, neoplatonism declined. Though there were mediaeval theologians, such as John Scotus Eriugena, who ventured into what might be called panpsychism, it was not a dominant strain in philosophical theology. But in the Italian Renaissance, it enjoyed something of a revival in the thought of figures such as Gerolamo Cardano, Bernardino Telesio, Francesco Patrizi, Giordano Bruno, and Tommaso Campanella. Cardano argued for the view that soul or anima was a fundamental part of the world, and Patrizi introduced the term panpsychism into philosophical vocabulary. According to Bruno, "There is nothing that does not possess a soul and that has no vital principle". Platonist ideas resembling the anima mundi (world soul) also resurfaced in the work of esoteric thinkers such as Paracelsus, Robert Fludd, and Cornelius Agrippa.

=== Early modern ===
In the 17th century, two rationalists, Baruch Spinoza and Gottfried Leibniz, can be said to be panpsychists. In Spinoza's monism, the one single infinite and eternal substance is "God, or Nature" (Deus sive Natura), which has the aspects of mind (thought) and matter (extension). Leibniz's view is that there are infinitely many absolutely simple mental substances called monads that make up the universe's fundamental structure. While it has been said that George Berkeley's idealist philosophy is also a form of panpsychism, Berkeley rejected panpsychism and posited that the physical world exists only in the experiences minds have of it, while restricting minds to humans and certain other specific agents.

=== 19th century ===
In the 19th century, panpsychism was at its zenith. Philosophers such as Arthur Schopenhauer, C.S. Peirce, Josiah Royce, William James, Eduard von Hartmann, F.C.S. Schiller, Ernst Haeckel, William Kingdon Clifford and Thomas Carlyle as well as psychologists such as Gustav Fechner, Wilhelm Wundt, Rudolf Hermann Lotze all promoted panpsychist ideas.

Arthur Schopenhauer argued for a two-sided view of reality as both Will and Representation (Vorstellung). According to Schopenhauer, "All ostensible mind can be attributed to matter, but all matter can likewise be attributed to mind".

Josiah Royce, the leading American absolute idealist, held that reality is a "world self", a conscious being that comprises everything, though he did not necessarily attribute mental properties to the smallest constituents of mentalistic "systems". The American pragmatist philosopher Charles Sanders Peirce espoused a sort of psycho-physical monism in which the universe is suffused with mind, which he associated with spontaneity and freedom. Following Peirce, William James also espoused a form of panpsychism. In his lecture notes, James wrote:

Our only intelligible notion of an object in itself is that it should be an object for itself, and this lands us in panpsychism and a belief that our physical perceptions are effects on us of 'psychical' realities

English philosopher Alfred Barratt, the author of Physical Metempiric (1883), has been described as advocating panpsychism.

In 1893, Paul Carus proposed a philosophy similar to panpsychism, "panbiotism", according to which "everything is fraught with life; it contains life; it has the ability to live".

=== 20th century ===
Bertrand Russell's neutral monist views tended toward panpsychism. The physicist Arthur Eddington also defended a form of panpsychism. The psychologists Gerard Heymans, James Ward and Charles Augustus Strong also endorsed variants of panpsychism.

In 1990, the physicist David Bohm published "A new theory of the relationship of mind and matter", a paper based on his interpretation of quantum mechanics. The philosopher Paavo Pylkkänen has described Bohm's view as a version of panprotopsychism.

One widespread misconception is that the arguably greatest systematic metaphysician of the 20th century, Alfred North Whitehead, was also panpsychism's most significant 20th century proponent. This misreading attributes to Whitehead an ontology according to which the basic nature of the world is made up of atomic mental events, termed "actual occasions". But rather than signifying such exotic metaphysical objects—which would in fact exemplify the fallacy of misplaced concreteness Whitehead criticizes—Whitehead's concept of "actual occasion" refers to the "immediate experienced occasion" of any possible perceiver, having in mind only himself as perceiver at the outset, in accordance with his strong commitment to radical empiricism.

=== Contemporary ===
Panpsychism has recently seen a resurgence in the philosophy of mind, set into motion by Thomas Nagel's 1979 article "Panpsychism" and further spurred by Galen Strawson's 2006 realistic monist article "Realistic Monism: Why Physicalism Entails Panpsychism". Other recent proponents include American philosophers David Ray Griffin and David Skrbina, British philosophers Gregg Rosenberg, Timothy Sprigge, Philip Goff, and Canadian philosopher William Seager. The British philosopher David Papineau, while distancing himself from orthodox panpsychists, has written that his view is "not unlike panpsychism" in that he rejects a line in nature between "events lit up by phenomenology [and] those that are mere darkness".

The integrated information theory of consciousness (IIT), proposed by the neuroscientist and psychiatrist Giulio Tononi in 2004 and since adopted by other neuroscientists such as Christof Koch, postulates that consciousness is widespread and can be found even in some simple systems.

In 2019, cognitive scientist Donald D. Hoffman published The Case Against Reality: How evolution hid the truth from our eyes. Hoffman argues that consensus reality lacks concrete existence, and is nothing more than an evolved user-interface. He argues that the true nature of reality is abstract "conscious agents". Science editor Annaka Harris argues that panpsychism is a viable theory in her 2019 book Conscious, though she stops short of fully endorsing it.

Panpsychism has been postulated by psychoanalyst Robin S. Brown as a means to theorizing relations between "inner" and "outer" tropes in the context of psychotherapy. Panpsychism has also been applied in environmental philosophy by Australian philosopher Freya Mathews, who has put forward the notion of ontopoetics as a version of panpsychism.

The geneticist Sewall Wright endorsed a version of panpsychism. He believed that consciousness is not a mysterious property emerging at a certain level of the hierarchy of increasing material complexity, but rather an inherent property, implying the most elementary particles have these properties.

== Varieties ==
Panpsychism encompasses many theories, united only by the notion that mind in some form is ubiquitous.

=== Philosophical frameworks ===
==== Cosmopsychism ====
Cosmopsychism hypothesizes that the cosmos is a unified object that is ontologically prior to its parts. It has been described as an alternative to panpsychism, or as a form of panpsychism. Proponents of cosmopsychism claim that the cosmos as a whole is the fundamental level of reality and that it instantiates consciousness. They differ on that point from panpsychists, who usually claim that the smallest level of reality is fundamental and instantiates consciousness. Accordingly, human consciousness, for example, merely derives from a larger cosmic consciousness.

==== Panexperientialism ====
Panexperientialism is associated with the philosophies of, among others, Charles Hartshorne and Alfred North Whitehead, although the term itself was invented by David Ray Griffin to distinguish the process philosophical view from other varieties of panpsychism. Whitehead's process philosophy argues that the fundamental elements of the universe are "occasions of experience", which can together create something as complex as a human being. Building on Whitehead's work, process philosopher Michel Weber argues for a pancreativism. Goff has used the term panexperientialism more generally to refer to forms of panpsychism in which experience rather than thought is ubiquitous.

==== Panprotopsychism ====
Panprotopsychists believe that higher-order phenomenal properties (such as qualia) are logically entailed by protophenomenal properties, at least in principle. This is similar to how facts about H_{2}O molecules logically entail facts about water: the lower-level facts are sufficient to explain the higher-order facts, since the former logically entail the latter. It also makes sense of questions about the unity of consciousness relating to the diversity of phenomenal experiences and the deflation of the self. Adherents of panprotopsychism believe that "protophenomenal" facts logically entail consciousness. Protophenomenal properties are usually picked out through a combination of functional and negative definitions: panphenomenal properties are those that logically entail phenomenal properties (a functional definition), which are themselves neither physical nor phenomenal (a negative definition).

Panprotopsychism is advertised as a solution to the combination problem: the problem of explaining how the consciousness of microscopic physical things might combine to give rise to the macroscopic consciousness of the whole brain. Because protophenomenal properties are by definition the constituent parts of consciousness, it is speculated that their existence would make the emergence of macroscopic minds less mysterious. The philosopher David Chalmers argues that the view faces difficulty with the combination problem. He considers it "ad hoc", and believes it diminishes the parsimony that made the theory initially interesting.

==== Russellian monism ====
Russellian monism is a type of neutral monism. The theory is attributed to Bertrand Russell, and may also be called Russell's panpsychism, or Russell's neutral monism. Russell believed that all causal properties are extrinsic manifestations of identical intrinsic properties. Russell called these identical internal properties quiddities. Just as the extrinsic properties of matter can form higher-order structure, so can their corresponding and identical quiddities. Russell believed the conscious mind was one such structure. If the quiddities are a form of consciousness, the resulting view is Russellian panpsychism, and if they involve proto-consciousness, the resulting view is Russellian panprotopsychism. Russellian physicalism is the view that quiddities can also be physical, without having any consciousness-like aspect, while remaining relevant to explaining consciousness.

==== Dispositional panpsychism ====
Dispositional panpsychism is a variety of panpsychism that integrates dispositionalism, the view that fundamental physical properties are irreducible causal powers, with the thesis of phenomenal consciousness, the qualitative "what it is like" aspect of consciousness. The view is advocated by Hedda Hassel Mørch, who argues that the only causal powers we can positively conceive of are mental properties, specifically those involving volition, motivation, or agency. Drawing on the "argument from the experience of causation”, historically traced to philosophers such as Gottfried Wilhelm Leibniz, Arthur Schopenhauer, and William James, the view posits that our direct experience of our own agency serves as the only positively conceivable model for the intrinsic nature of physical causation, so that all relations in the world involve a phenomenal aspect, making the view a form of panpsychism. Central to this account is the "phenomenal powers view", according to which phenomenal properties such as pain or pleasure are not merely qualitative but intrinsically powerful. For example, the feeling of pain necessarily motivates avoidance behavior in virtue of its specific phenomenal character.

==== Monadic and Leibnizian panpsychism ====
Monadic panpsychism is a variety of panpsychism inspired by the philosophy of Gottfried Wilhelm Leibniz, though not committed to the same ontological postulates. The theory is attributed to Nino Kadic, who argues that the experience of each simple subject is determined relationally by the structure it is in: either one simple subject takes on a "dominant" role and instantiates the full consciousness of the structure it is part of, like the brain, or all relevant simple subjects of the structure instantiate full consciousness. The former is the dynamic version of the view and the latter the global version. The aim is to avoid both the combination and emergence of a complex subject. Relatedly, S. Siddharth and Tejas Bhojraj propose Leibnizian panpsychism, arguing that there is neither a "dominant" simple subject nor many with identical experiences, but rather a determinate "causal neighborhood" where many simple subjects have similar but not identical experiences of the structure.

==== Continuist panpsychism ====
Continuist panpsychism (or simply continuism) is a variety of panpsychism proposed by Luke Roelofs, according to which while human consciousness is informationally bounded (causally and functionally distinct), it is likely phenomenally unbounded (part of a single, continuous field of experience). Roelofs distinguishes between six senses of boundedness, ultimately claiming that the intuition that our minds are separate "phenomenal fields" is an illusion caused by our informational isolation. Instead, he proposes that the universe consists of a single continuous field of consciousness and individual subjects are informationally dense regions within it. This view addresses the combination problem by positing phenomenal unity as the fundamental default rather than something that must be created. Unlike some forms of cosmopsychism, continuism does not necessarily imply that the universe is a coherent "subject" with agency or intelligence; it could be a "mindless" field of experience.

=== Religious or mystical ontologies ===
==== Advaita Vedānta ====
Advaita Vedānta is a form of idealism in Indian philosophy which views consensus reality as illusory. Anand Vaidya and Purushottama Bilimoria have argued that it can be considered a form of panpsychism or cosmopsychism.

==== Animism and hylozoism ====
Animism maintains that all things have a soul, and hylozoism maintains that all things are alive. Both could reasonably be interpreted as panpsychist, but both have fallen out of favour in contemporary academia. Modern panpsychists have tried to distance themselves from theories of this sort, careful to carve out the distinction between the ubiquity of experience and the ubiquity of mind and cognition.

==== Panpsychism and metempsychosis ====
Between 1840 and 1864, the Austrian mystic Jakob Lorber claimed to have received a 26-volume revelation. Various books of the Lorber Revelations say that specifica, closely resembling Leibniz's monads, form the most basic, irreducible substance of all physical and metaphysical creation. According to the Lorber Revelations, specifica grow in complexity and intelligence to form ever higher level clusters of intelligence until a fully intelligent human soul is reached. In this scenario panpsychism and metempsychosis are used to overcome the combination problem.

==== Buddha-nature ====
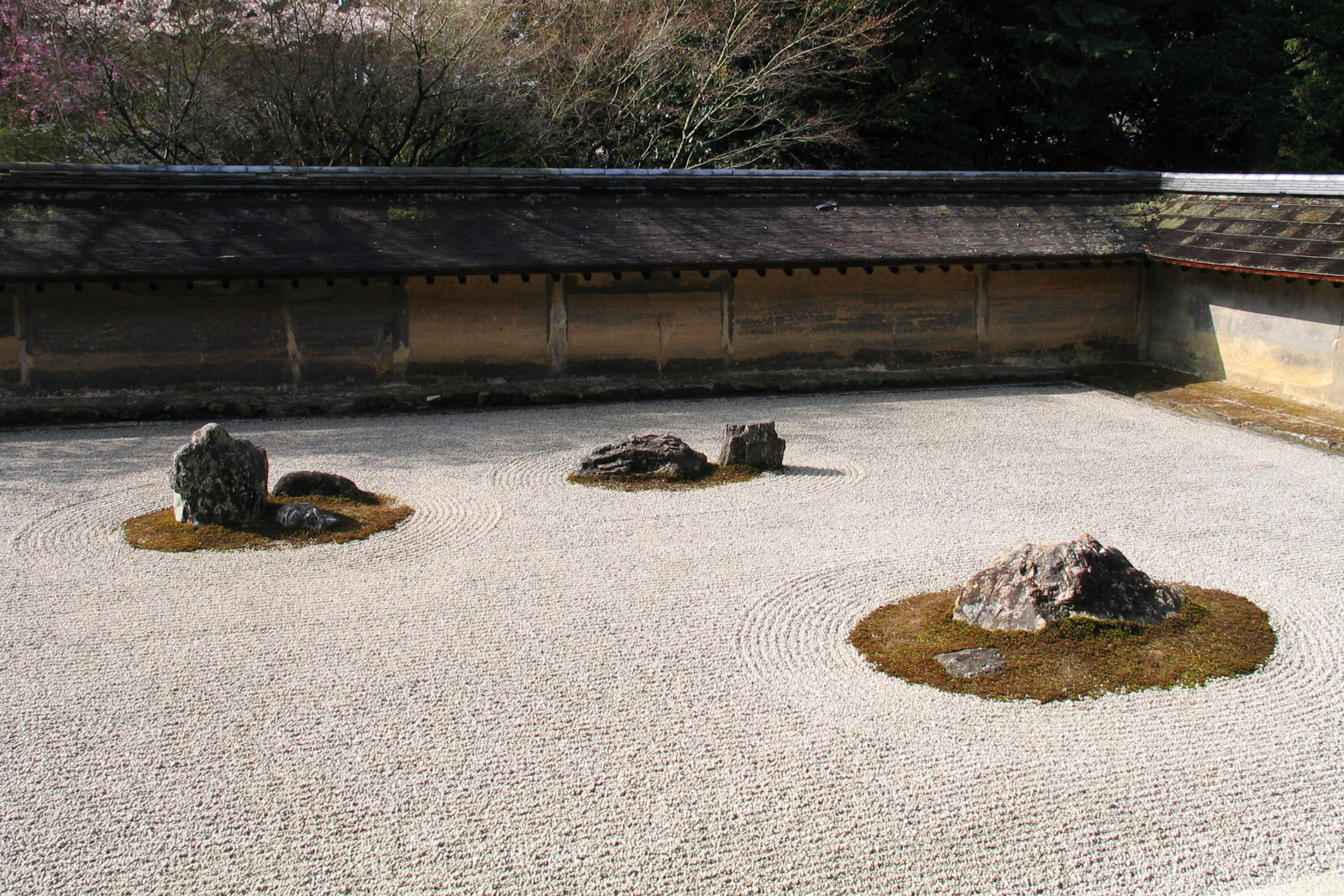
In the art of the Japanese rock garden, the artist must be aware of the "ishigokoro" ('heart', or 'mind') of the rocks.

Buddha-nature is an important and multifaceted doctrine in Mahayana Buddhism that is related to the capacity to attain Buddhahood. In numerous Indian sources, the idea is connected to the mind, especially the Buddhist concept of the luminous mind. In some Buddhist traditions, the Buddha-nature doctrine may be interpreted as implying a form of panpsychism. Graham Parks argues that most "traditional Chinese, Japanese and Korean philosophy would qualify as panpsychist in nature".

The Huayan, Tiantai, and Tendai schools of Buddhism explicitly attribute Buddha-nature to inanimate objects such as lotus flowers and mountains. This idea was defended by figures such as the Tiantai patriarch Zhanran, who spoke of the Buddha-nature of grasses and trees. Similarly, Soto Zen master Dogen argued that "insentient beings expound" the teachings of the Buddha, and wrote about the "mind" (心, shin) of "fences, walls, tiles, and pebbles". The 9th-century Shingon figure Kukai went so far as to argue that natural objects such as rocks and stones are part of the supreme embodiment of the Buddha. According to Parks, Buddha-nature is best described "in western terms" as something "psychophysical".

=== Scientific theories ===
==== Conscious realism ====
It is a natural and near-universal assumption that the world has the properties and causal structures that we perceive it to have; to paraphrase Einstein's famous remark, we naturally assume that the moon is there whether anyone looks or not. Both theoretical and empirical considerations, however, increasingly indicate that this is not correct.

— Donald Hoffman, Conscious agent networks: Formal analysis and applications to cognition

Conscious realism is a theory proposed by Donald Hoffman, a cognitive scientist specialising in perception. He has written numerous papers on the topic which he summarised in his 2019 book The Case Against Reality: How evolution hid the truth from our eyes. Conscious realism builds upon Hoffman's former User-Interface Theory. In combination they argue that (1) consensus reality and spacetime are illusory, and are merely a "species specific evolved user interface"; (2) Reality is made of a complex, dimensionless, and timeless network of "conscious agents".

The consensus view is that perception is a reconstruction of one's environment. Hoffman views perception as a construction rather than a reconstruction. He argues that perceptual systems are analogous to information channels, and thus subject to data compression and reconstruction. The set of possible reconstructions for any given data set is quite large. Of that set, the subset that is homomorphic in relation to the original is minuscule, and does not necessarily—or, seemingly, even often—overlap with the subset that is efficient or easiest to use.

For example, consider a graph, such as a pie chart. A pie chart is easy to understand and use not because it is perfectly homomorphic with the data it represents, but because it is not. If a graph of, for example, the chemical composition of the human body were to look exactly like a human body, then we could not understand it. It is only because the graph abstracts away from the structure of its subject matter that it can be visualized. Alternatively, consider a graphical user interface on a computer. The reason graphical user interfaces are useful is that they abstract away from lower-level computational processes, such as machine code, or the physical state of a circuit-board. In general, it seems that data is most useful to us when it is abstracted from its original structure and repackaged in a way that is easier to understand, even if this comes at the cost of accuracy. Hoffman offers the "fitness beats truth theorem" as mathematical proof that perceptions of reality bear little resemblance to reality's true nature. From this he concludes that our senses do not faithfully represent the external world.

Even if reality is an illusion, Hoffman takes consciousness as an indisputable fact. He represents rudimentary units of consciousness (which he calls "conscious agents") as Markovian kernels. Though the theory was not initially panpsychist, he reports that he and his colleague Chetan Prakash found the math to be more parsimonious if it were. They hypothesize that reality is composed of these conscious agents, who interact to form "larger, more complex" networks.

==== Integrated information theory ====
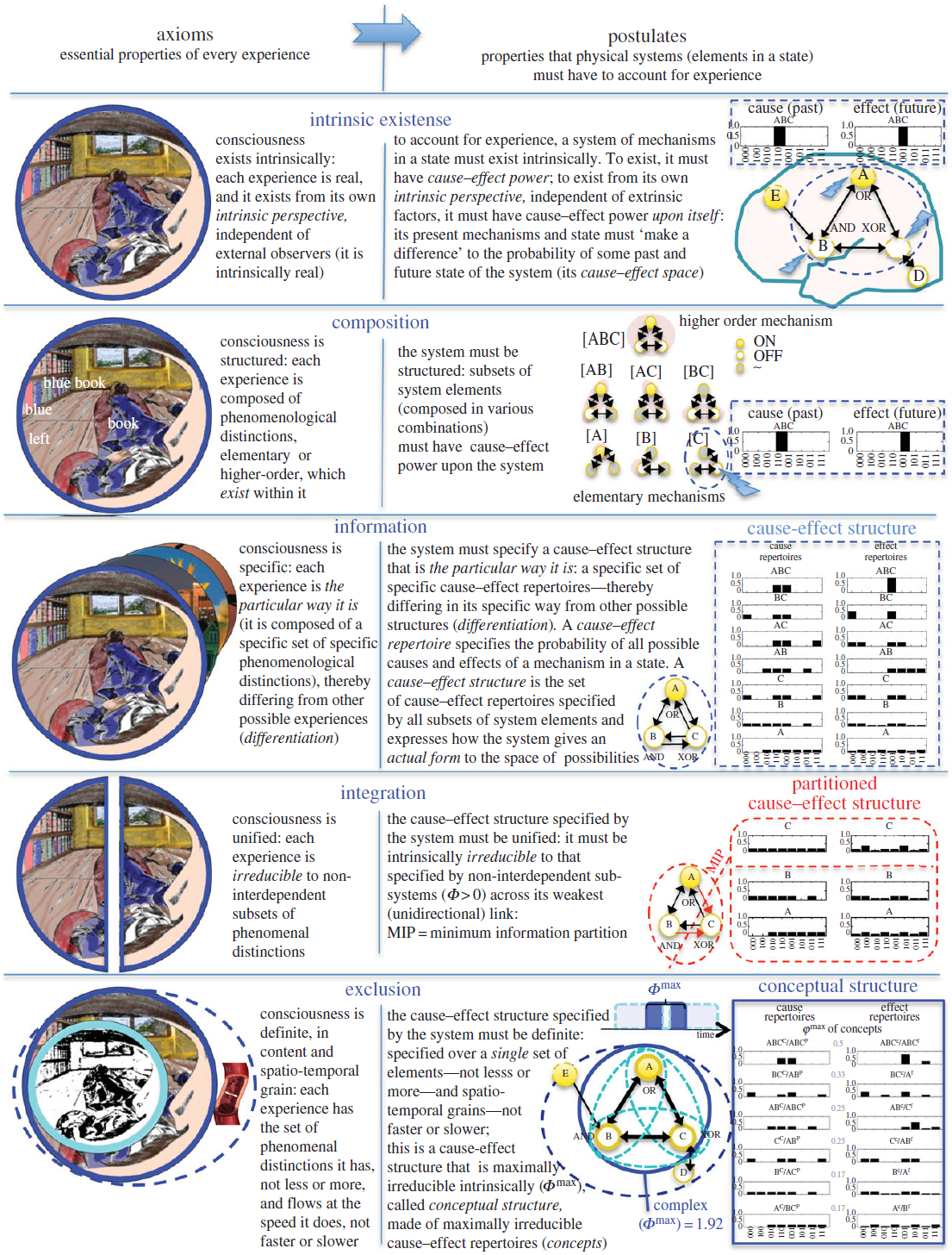
Axioms and postulates of integrated information theory

Integrated information theory (IIT) was first proposed by Giulio Tononi in 2004, and it has undergone two major revisions since then. Tononi approaches consciousness from a scientific perspective, and has expressed frustration with philosophical theories of consciousness for lacking predictive power. Though integral to his theory, he refrains from philosophical terminology such as qualia or the unity of consciousness, instead opting for mathematically precise alternatives like entropy function and information integration. This has allowed Tononi to create a measurement for integrated information, which he calls phi (Φ). He believes consciousness is nothing but integrated information, so Φ measures consciousness. As it turns out, even basic objects or substances have a nonzero degree of Φ. This would mean that consciousness is ubiquitous, albeit to a minimal degree.

The philosopher Hedda Hassel Mørch's views IIT as similar to Russellian monism, while other philosophers, such as Chalmers and John Searle, consider it a form of panpsychism. IIT does not hold that all systems are conscious, leading Tononi and Koch to state that IIT incorporates some elements of panpsychism but not others. Koch has called IIT a "scientifically refined version" of panpsychism.

== In relation to other theories ==
A diagram depicting four positions on the mind-body problem. Versions of panpsychism have been likened to each of these positions as well as contrasted to them.

Because panpsychism encompasses a wide range of theories, it can in principle be compatible with reductive materialism, dualism, functionalism, or other perspectives depending on the details of a given formulation.

=== Dualism ===
David Chalmers and Philip Goff have each described panpsychism as an alternative to both materialism and dualism. Chalmers says panpsychism respects the conclusions of both the causal argument against dualism and the conceivability argument for dualism. Goff has argued that panpsychism avoids the disunity of dualism, under which mind and matter are ontologically separate, as well as dualism's problems explaining how mind and matter interact. By contrast, Uwe Meixner argues that panpsychism has dualist forms, which he contrasts to idealist forms.

=== Emergentism ===
Panpsychism is incompatible with emergentism. In general, theories of consciousness fall under one or the other umbrella; they hold either that consciousness is already present at a fundamental level of reality (panpsychism) or that it emerges as a higher-order phenomenon out of the composite interaction of fundamental parts (emergentism).

=== Idealism ===
There is disagreement over whether idealism is a form of panpsychism or a separate view. Both views hold that everything that exists has some form of experience. According to the philosophers William Seager and Sean Allen-Hermanson, "idealists are panpsychists by default". Charles Hartshorne contrasted panpsychism and idealism, saying that while idealists rejected the existence of the world observed with the senses or understood it as ideas within the mind of God, panpsychists accepted the reality of the world but saw it as composed of minds. Chalmers also contrasts panpsychism with idealism (as well as materialism and dualism). Meixner writes that formulations of panpsychism can be divided into dualist and idealist versions. He further divides the latter into "atomistic idealistic panpsychism", which he ascribes to David Hume, and "holistic idealistic panpsychism", which he favors.

=== Neutral monism ===
Neutral monism rejects the dichotomy of mind and matter, instead taking a third substance as fundamental that is neither mental nor physical. Proposals for the nature of the third substance have varied, with some theorists choosing to leave it undefined. This has led to a variety of formulations of neutral monism, which may overlap with other philosophies. In versions of neutral monism in which the world's fundamental constituents are neither mental nor physical, it is quite distinct from panpsychism. In versions where the fundamental constituents are both mental and physical, neutral monism may lead to panpsychism, panprotopsychism, or dual aspect theory.

In The Conscious Mind, David Chalmers writes that, in some instances, the differences between "Russell's neutral monism" and his property dualism are merely semantic. Philip Goff believes that neutral monism can reasonably be regarded as a form of panpsychism "in so far as it is a dual aspect view". Neutral monism, panpsychism, and dual aspect theory are grouped together or used interchangeably in some contexts.

=== Physicalism and materialism ===
Chalmers calls panpsychism an alternative to both materialism and dualism. Similarly, Goff calls panpsychism an alternative to both physicalism and substance dualism. Strawson, on the other hand, describes panpsychism as a form of physicalism, in his view the only viable form. Panpsychism can be combined with reductive materialism but cannot be combined with eliminative materialism because the latter denies the existence of the relevant mental attributes.

== Arguments for ==
=== Hard problem of consciousness ===
But what consciousness is, we know not; and how it is that anything so remarkable as a state of consciousness comes about as the result of irritating nervous tissue, is just as unaccountable as the appearance of the Djin when Aladdin rubbed his lamp in the story, or as any other ultimate fact of nature.

— Thomas Henry Huxley (1896)

It evidently feels like something to be a human brain. This means that when things in the world are organised in a particular way, they begin to have an experience. The questions of why and how this material structure has experience, and why it has that particular experience rather than another experience, are known as the hard problem of consciousness. The term is attributed to Chalmers. He argues that even after "all the perceptual and cognitive functions within the vicinity of consciousness" are accounted for, "there may still remain a further unanswered question: Why is the performance of these functions accompanied by experience?"

Though Chalmers gave the hard problem of consciousness its present name, similar views were expressed before. Isaac Newton, John Locke, Gottfried Leibniz, John Stuart Mill, Thomas Henry Huxley, Wilhelm Wundt, all wrote about the seeming incompatibility of third-person functional descriptions of mind and matter and first-person conscious experience. Likewise, Asian philosophers like Dharmakirti and Guifeng Zongmi discussed the problem of how consciousness arises from unconscious matter. Similar sentiments have been articulated through philosophical inquiries such as the problem of other minds, solipsism, the explanatory gap, philosophical zombies, and Mary's room. These problems have caused Chalmers to consider panpsychism a viable solution to the hard problem, though he is not committed to any single view.

Brian Jonathan Garrett has compared the hard problem to vitalism, the now discredited hypothesis that life is inexplicable and can only be understood if some vital life force exists. He maintains that given time, consciousness and its evolutionary origins will be understood just as life is now understood. Daniel Dennett called the hard problem a "hunch", and maintained that conscious experience, as it is usually understood, is merely a complex cognitive illusion. Patricia Churchland, also an eliminative materialist, maintains that philosophers ought to be more patient: neuroscience is still in its early stages, so Chalmers's hard problem is premature. Clarity will come from learning more about the brain, not from metaphysical speculation.

==== Solutions ====
In The Conscious Mind (1996), Chalmers attempts to pinpoint why the hard problem is so hard. He concludes that consciousness is irreducible to lower-level physical facts, just as the fundamental laws of physics are irreducible to lower-level physical facts. Therefore, consciousness should be taken as fundamental in its own right and studied as such. Just as fundamental properties of reality are ubiquitous (even small objects have mass), consciousness may also be, though he considers that an open question.

In Mortal Questions (1979), Thomas Nagel argues that panpsychism follows from four premises:

- P1: There is no spiritual plane or disembodied soul; everything that exists is material.
- P2: Consciousness is irreducible to lower-level physical properties.
- P3: Consciousness exists.
- P4: Higher-order properties of matter (i.e., emergent properties) can, at least in principle, be reduced to their lower-level properties.

Before the first premise is accepted, the range of possible explanations for consciousness is fully open. Each premise, if accepted, narrows down that range of possibilities. If the argument is sound, then by the last premise panpsychism is the only possibility left.

- If (P1) is true, then either consciousness does not exist, or it exists within the physical world.
- If (P2) is true, then either consciousness does not exist, or it (a) exists as distinct property of matter or (b) is fundamentally entailed by matter.
- If (P3) is true, then consciousness exists, and is either (a) its own property of matter or (b) composed by the matter of the brain but not logically entailed by it.
- If (P4) is true, then (b) is false, and consciousness must be its own unique property of matter.

Therefore, if all four premises are true, consciousness is its own unique property of matter and panpsychism is true.

=== Mind-body problem ===
Dualism makes the problem insoluble; materialism denies the existence of any phenomenon to study, and hence of any problem.

— John R. Searle, Consciousness and Language, p. 47

In 2015, Chalmers proposed a possible solution to the mind-body problem through the argumentative format of thesis, antithesis, and synthesis. The goal of such arguments is to argue for sides of a debate (the thesis and antithesis), weigh their vices and merits, and then reconcile them (the synthesis). Chalmers's thesis, antithesis, and synthesis are as follows:

1. Thesis: materialism is true; everything is fundamentally physical.
2. Antithesis: dualism is true; not everything is fundamentally physical.
3. Synthesis: panpsychism is true.

(1) A centerpiece of Chalmers's argument is the physical world's causal closure. Newton's law of motion explains this phenomenon succinctly: for every action there is an equal and opposite reaction. Cause and effect is a symmetrical process. There is no room for consciousness to exert any causal power on the physical world unless it is itself physical.

(2) On one hand, if consciousness is separate from the physical world then there is no room for it to exert any causal power on the world (a state of affairs philosophers call epiphenomenalism). If consciousness plays no causal role, then it is unclear how Chalmers could even write this paper. On the other hand, consciousness is irreducible to the physical processes of the brain.

(3) Panpsychism has all the benefits of materialism because it could mean that consciousness is physical while also escaping the grasp of epiphenomenalism. After some argumentation Chalmers narrows it down further to Russellian monism, concluding that thoughts, actions, intentions and emotions may just be the quiddities of neurotransmitters, neurons, and glial cells.

=== Problem of substance ===
Physics is mathematical, not because we know so much about the physical world, but because we know so little: it is only its mathematical properties that we can discover. For the rest our knowledge is negative.

— Bertrand Russell, An Outline of Philosophy (1927)

Rather than solely trying to solve the problem of consciousness, Russell also attempted to solve the problem of substance, which is arguably a form of the problem of infinite regress.

1. Like many sciences, physics describes the world through mathematics. Unlike other sciences, physics cannot describe what Schopenhauer called the "object that grounds" mathematics. Economics is grounded in allocation of resources, and population dynamics is grounded in individual people within a population. But the objects that ground physics can be described only through more mathematics. In Russell's words, physics describes "certain equations giving abstract properties of their changes". When it comes to describing "what it is that changes, and what it changes from and to—as to this, physics is silent". In other words, physics describes matter's extrinsic properties, but not the intrinsic properties that ground them.
2. Russell argued that physics is mathematical because "it is only mathematical properties we can discover". This is true almost by definition: if only extrinsic properties are outwardly observable, then they will be the only ones discovered. This led Alfred North Whitehead to conclude that intrinsic properties are "intrinsically unknowable".
3. Consciousness has many similarities to these intrinsic properties of physics. It, too, cannot be directly observed from an outside perspective. And it, too, seems to ground many observable extrinsic properties: presumably, music is enjoyable because of the experience of listening to it, and chronic pain is avoided because of the experience of pain, etc. Russell concluded that consciousness must be related to these extrinsic properties of matter. He called these intrinsic properties quiddities. Just as extrinsic physical properties can create structures, so can their corresponding and identical quiddites. The conscious mind, Russell argued, is one such structure.

Proponents of panpsychism who use this line of reasoning include Chalmers, Annaka Harris, and Galen Strawson. Chalmers has argued that the extrinsic properties of physics must have corresponding intrinsic properties; otherwise the universe would be "a giant causal flux" with nothing for "causation to relate", which he deems a logical impossibility. He sees consciousness as a promising candidate for that role. Galen Strawson calls Russell's panpsychism "realistic physicalism". He argues that "the experiential considered specifically as such" is what it means for something to be physical. Just as mass is energy, Strawson believes that consciousness "just is" matter.

Max Tegmark, theoretical physicist and creator of the mathematical universe hypothesis, disagrees with these conclusions. By his account, the universe is not just describable by math but is math; comparing physics to economics or population dynamics is a disanalogy. While population dynamics may be grounded in individual people, those people are grounded in "purely mathematical objects" such as energy and charge. The universe is, in a fundamental sense, made of nothing.

=== Quantum mechanics ===
The quantum mind hypothesis attempts to relate consciousness to quantum mechanical processes. In 2007, Steven Pinker criticized explanations of consciousness invoking quantum physics, saying: "to my ear, this amounts to the feeling that quantum mechanics sure is weird, and consciousness sure is weird, so maybe quantum mechanics can explain consciousness"—a view echoed by physicist Stephen Hawking. As of May 2026, no theoretical or experimental evidence supports "the biologically instantiated existence of quantum states in the brain".

In a 2018 interview, Chalmers called quantum mechanics "a magnet for anyone who wants to find room for crazy properties of the mind". Quantum physics models the states of quantum systems (atoms, photons, etc.) with wavefunctions, which define probability distributions of observing a state. Wavefunctions are generally in quantum superposition and quantum entanglement between multiple states but can collapse into a single classical state upon interaction with the external world. The questions of why wavefunction collapse occurs and how quantum and classical reality correspond are known as the measurement problem and central to different interpretations of quantum mechanics. According to the Copenhagen interpretation, one of the oldest and most widely taught interpretations, the act of observation irreversibly collapses the wavefunction, destroying quantum information.

According to the Copenhagen interpretation of quantum mechanics, Schrödinger's cat is both dead and alive until observed or measured in some way.

Erwin Schrödinger famously articulated the Copenhagen interpretation's unusual implications in the thought experiment now known as Schrödinger's cat. In the experiment, whether a cat is alive or dead depends on the state of a quantum particle. Schrödinger posits that before an observer perceives the cat as alive or dead, it is both alive and dead. He asks, where does one distinguish between the "quantum system", the "measurement," and the "observer"? The many-worlds interpretation of quantum mechanics instead denies that wavefunction collapse occurs, describing the entire universe as a universal wave function in which quantum information is conserved. In the many-worlds interpretation, the cat is both dead and alive, and the observer both sees a dead cat and sees a living cat. The larger question is then why the observer finds themself in only one "branch" of this larger reality. In Roger Penrose's words:

I do not see why a conscious being need be aware of only "one" of the alternatives in a linear superposition. What is it about consciousnesses that says that consciousness must not be "aware" of that tantalising linear combination of both a dead and a live cat? It seems to me that a theory of consciousness would be needed for one to square the many-world view with what one actually observes.

The measurement problem has largely been characterized as the clash of classical physics and quantum mechanics. Bohm argued that it is rather a clash of classical physics, quantum mechanics, and phenomenology; the three levels of description seem to be difficult to reconcile, or even contradictory. Though not referring specifically to quantum mechanics, Chalmers has written that if a theory of everything is ever discovered, it will be a set of "psychophysical laws" rather than simply a set of physical laws. With Chalmers as their inspiration, Bohm and Pylkkänen set out to do just that in their panprotopsychism. Chalmers, who is critical of the Copenhagen interpretation, has coined this "the Law of the Minimisation of Mystery".

Chalmers believes that the tentative variant of panpsychism outlined in The Conscious Mind (1996) solves Penrose's problem. He believes that information will play an integral role in any theory of consciousness because the mind and brain have corresponding informational structures. He considers the computational nature of physics further evidence of information's central role and suggests that information that is physically realised is simultaneously phenomenally realised; both regularities in nature and conscious experience are expressions of information's underlying character. On Chalmers's formulation, information in any given position is phenomenally realised, whereas the informational state of the superposition as a whole is not. Panpsychist interpretations of quantum mechanics have been put forward Alfred North Whitehead, Shan Gao, Michael Lockwood, and Donald D. Hoffman. Protopanpsychist interpretations have been put forward by Bohm and Pylkkänen.

== Arguments against ==
=== Theoretical issues ===
One criticism of panpsychism is that it cannot be empirically tested. A corollary of this criticism is that panpsychism has no predictive power. Tononi and Koch write: "Besides claiming that matter and mind are one thing, [panpsychism] has little constructive to say and offers no positive laws explaining how the mind is organized and works".

John Searle has alleged that panpsychism's unfalsifiability goes deeper than run-of-the-mill untestability: it is unfalsifiable because "It does not get up to the level of being false. It is strictly speaking meaningless because no clear notion has been given to the claim". The need for coherence and clarification is accepted by David Skrbina, a proponent of panpsychism.

Many proponents of panpsychism base their arguments not on empirical support but on panpsychism's theoretical virtues. Chalmers says that while no direct evidence exists for the theory, neither is there direct evidence against it, and that "there are indirect reasons, of a broadly theoretical character, for taking the view seriously". Notwithstanding Tononi and Koch's criticism of panpsychism, they state that it integrates consciousness into the physical world in a way that is "elegantly unitary".

A related criticism is what seems to many to be the theory's bizarre nature. Goff dismisses this objection: though he admits that panpsychism is counterintuitive, he argues that Einstein's and Darwin's theories are also counterintuitive. "At the end of the day", he writes, "you should judge a view not for its cultural associations but by its explanatory power".

=== Problem of mental causation ===
Philosophers such as Chalmers have argued that theories of consciousness should be capable of providing insight into the brain and mind to avoid the problem of mental causation. If they fail to do that, the theory will succumb to epiphenomenalism, a view commonly criticised as implausible or even self-contradictory. Proponents of panpsychism (especially those with neutral monist tendencies) hope to bypass this problem by dismissing it as a false dichotomy; mind and matter are two sides of the same coin, and mental causation is merely the extrinsic description of intrinsic properties of mind. Robert Howell has argued that all causal functions are still accounted for dispositionally (i.e., in terms of the behaviors described by science), leaving phenomenality causally inert. He concludes, "This leaves us once again with epiphenomenal qualia, only in a very surprising place". Neutral monists reject such dichotomous views of mind-body interaction.

=== Combination problem ===
The combination problem (which is related to the binding problem) can be traced to William James, but was given its present name by William Seager in 1995. The problem arises from the tension between the seemingly irreducible nature of consciousness and its ubiquity. If consciousness is ubiquitous, then in panpsychism, every atom (or every bit, depending on the version of panpsychism) has a minimal level of it. How then, as Keith Frankish puts it, do these "tiny consciousnesses combine" to create larger conscious experiences such as "the twinge of pain" he feels in his knee? This objection has garnered significant attention, and many have attempted to answer it. None of the proposed answers has gained widespread acceptance.

Concepts related to this problem include the classical sorites paradox (aggregates and organic wholes), mereology (the philosophical study of parts and wholes), Gestalt psychology, and Leibniz's concept of the vinculum substantiale.

== See also ==
Concepts

- Anima mundi (World soul)
- Egregore
- Gaia hypothesis
- Holographic Universe
- Mana (Mandaeism)
- Maya (illusion)
- Microcosm–macrocosm analogy
- Monadology
- Monistic idealism
- Mythopoeic thought
- Noosphere
- Pandeism
- Panentheism
- Pantheism
- Philosophy of mind
- Polypsychism
- Reflexive monism
- Transpersonal psychology
- Theistic Personalism – Philosophical conception of deity

People

- Aleksei Aleksandrovich Kozlov
- Alfred North Whitehead
- David Chalmers
- Friedrich Paulsen
- Galen Strawson
- Gerard Heymans
- Gordon Pask
- Iain McGilchrist
- Mary Whiton Calkins
- Paul Carus
- Philip Goff
- Pierre Teilhard de Chardin
