= Gerard Heymans =

Dutch philosopher and psychologist

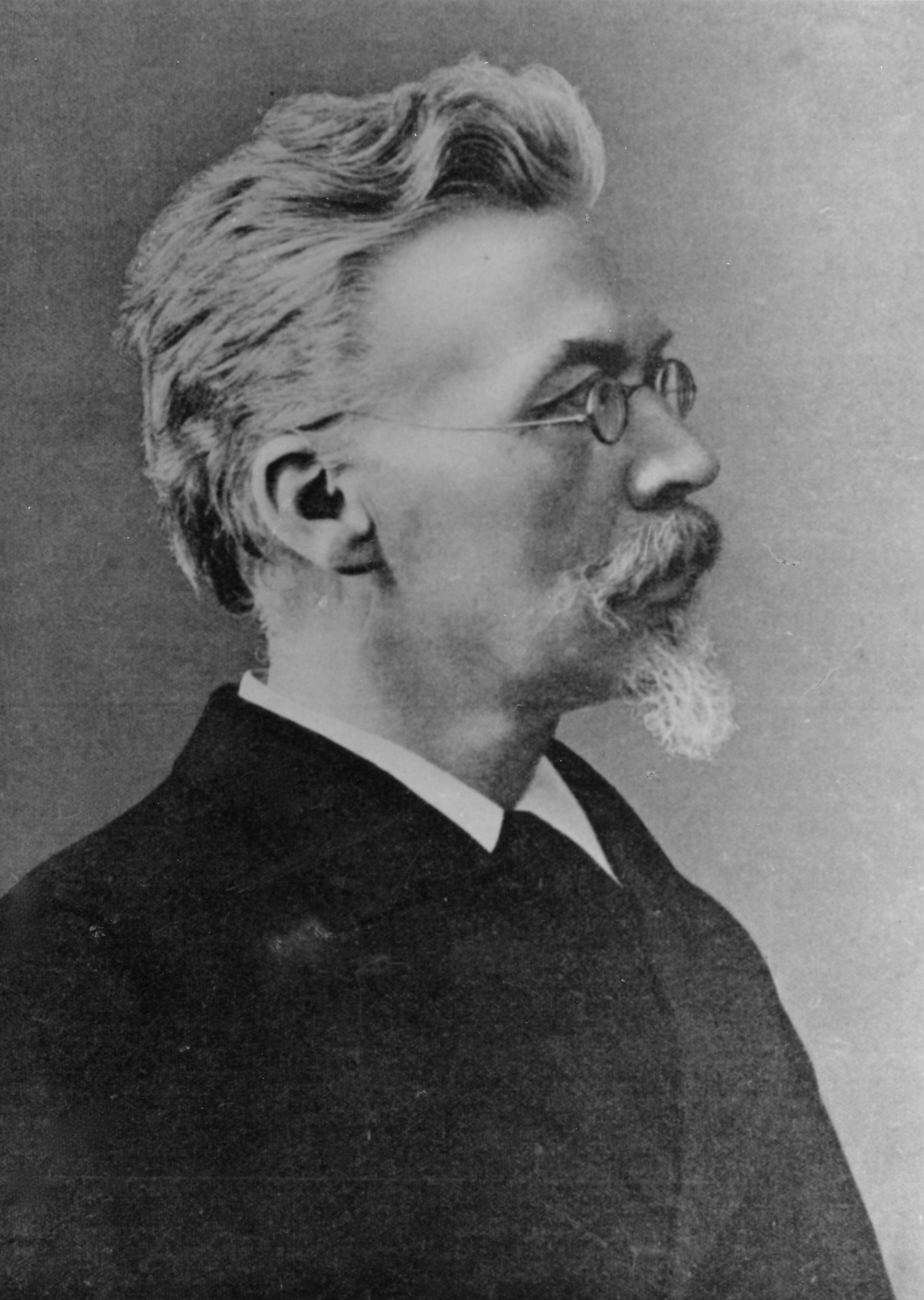
- Heymans in 1906
- Born: 17 April 1857; Ferwerd
- Died: 18 February 1930 (aged 72); Groningen
- Occupation: Professor

Education
- Education: Leiden University (Ph.D.); University of Freiburg (Ph.D.)

Philosophical work
- Era: 20th-century philosophy
- Region: Western philosophy
- School: Monism
- Institutions: University of Groningen

Signature
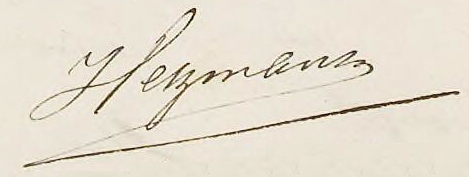

Gerardus Heymans (Dutch: [ˈɦɛimɑns]; 17 April 1857 – 18 February 1930) was a Dutch philosopher and psychologist. From 1890 to 1927, he worked as a professor of philosophy at the University of Groningen (UG). He also served as rector magnificus (president) of the UG in the academic year 1908–1909. Heymans is one of the most influential philosophers of the Netherlands and the pioneer of Dutch psychology. The establishment of his psychological laboratory marked the start of experimental psychology in the Netherlands.

== Life ==
Heymans was born in Friesland as the son of the municipal secretary Jan Heijmans and his wife Sara Wijsman. He went to the HBS (Hogere Burgerschool, an old form of high school education) in Leeuwarden and then studied law and philosophy at the University of Leiden. In 1880 he obtained his doctorate in political science. After that studied philosophy at the University of Freiburg, where he obtained his doctorate in 1881. In the same year he married Anthonia Barkey in Leiden. He got work as a tutor and then as a private lecturer in philosophy at the University of Leiden.

In 1890 Heymans was appointed professor at the Faculty of Arts and Philosophy at the UG. He went on to teach philosophy and psychology. He and his wife first took up residence on the Stationsstraat in Groningen, where Heymans set up his psychological laboratory in 1892. In 1894 they moved to the villa on the Ubbo Emmiussingel that they had designed by H.P. Berlage. Heymans was Rector Magnificus of the University of Groningen from 1908 to 1909. In his speech, he outlined a future of psychology with great social value. In the following year, in 1910, his wife Anthonia died.

In 1909 Heymans was allocated a large lecture hall and space for his laboratory. His lectures were popular and attracted many students from other studies, professors and other interested parties. At one point Heymans even had to give his lectures twice. Heymans continued to publish books and articles in various fields of philosophy and psychology throughout his academic career. In 1926 he was chairman of the International Congress of Psychology that was then held in Groningen. Heymans retired in 1927. Three years later, he died after his health had deteriorated rapidly.

Heymans maintained many good friendships, including with other professors. He regularly took long walks with J. C. Kapteyn and was good friends with Enno Wiersma, a professor of psychiatry and neurology, with whom he also conducted several studies. In addition, he and his wife often received visitors and guests such as Sebald Rudolf Steinmetz and his wife, whom he had met during his studies in Leiden.

Heymans has also been a member of several associations. From 1900 he, for example, was a member of the Royal Netherlands Academy of Arts and Sciences (KNAW). After the First World War, however, he cancelled his membership because the Academy did not take a neutral stance toward scientists from Germany and Austria. In 1919 Heymans became the first chairman of the Study Association for Psychical Research (SPR). This is the Dutch version of the Society for Psychical Research, which was founded in Great Britain in 1882. A few years later he stopped because there was too little interest in scientific research within the association.

In his time, Heymans was famous both in and outside of the Netherlands. He, for example, was offered positions at German universities multiple times. Heymans also received many awards. He became Commander in the Order of Orange Nassau and was an honorary member of The British Psychological Society.

== Work ==
Heymans wrote several books and essays and regularly wrote for De Gids, a literary magazine. Here he wrote on a variety of topics and his dissertation was also included in this.

=== Philosophy ===
Heymans wanted to build a philosophical system based on an empirical method. When he was appointed professor, he gave a talk called the experiment in philosophy. According to Heymans, facts should be the starting point for philosophical analyses. He, however, did not think that everything could be derived from experience, such as logical laws which makes that Heymans cannot be counted as an empiricist.

==== Psychic monism ====
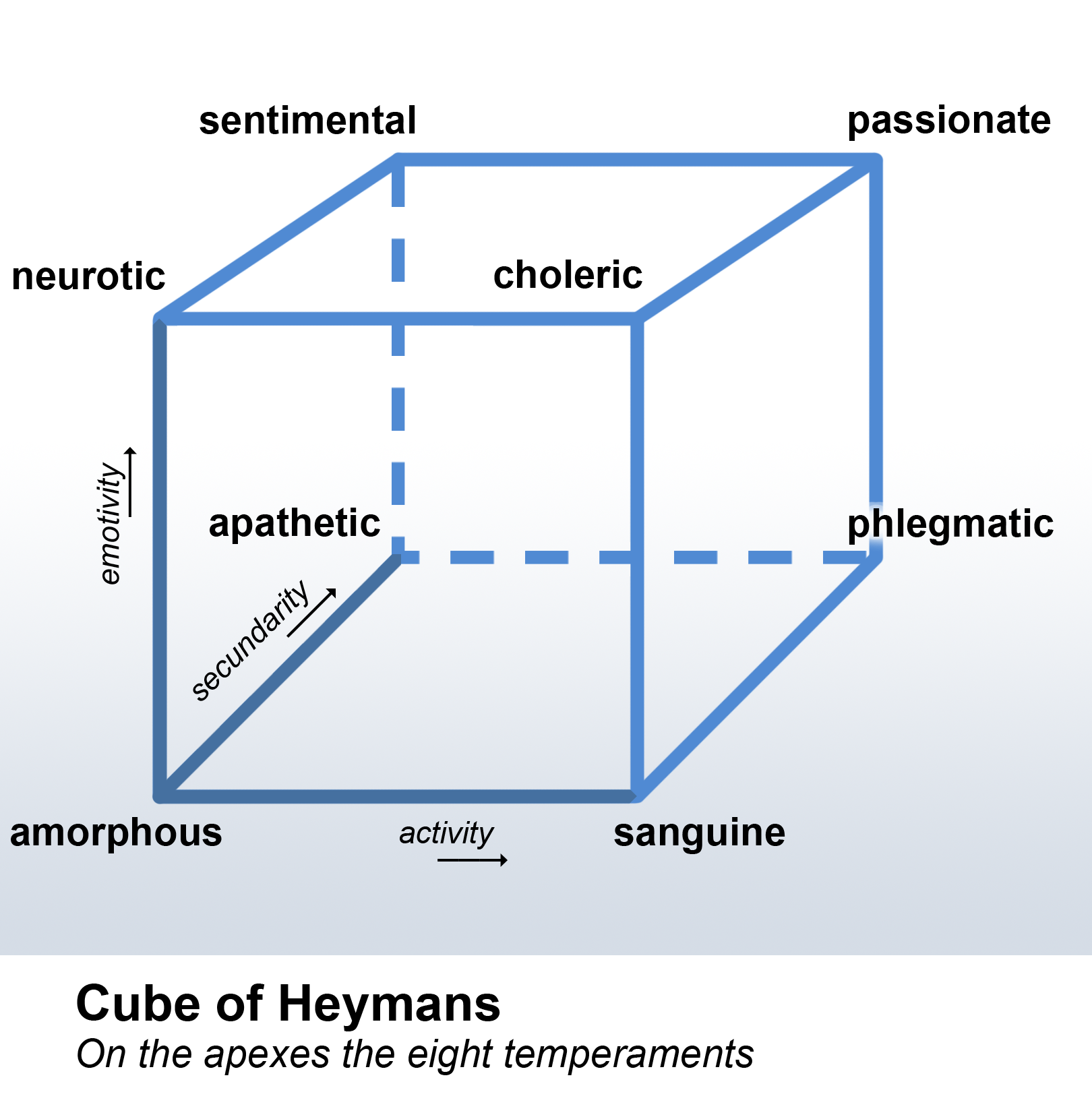
Figure 1.

In his metaphysics, Heymans was concerned with philosophy of the mind. His book Einführung in die Metaphysik deals with the mind–body problem. Heymans proposed a form of psychic monism; reality consists of the mind. This is in contrast to materialism, which assumes that everything is ultimately made of matter. Heymans' theory is comparable to panpsychism in which he was influenced by Gustav Fechner. Heymans argued that everything is part of one World Consciousness and that everything is connected. Here too Heymans assumed the possibility of investigating consciousness with the empirical method. His book was well-received among the general public and other philosophers. William James, for example, called it "a masterpiece of clear composition.

=== Psychology ===
Heymans was appointed professor to teach the history of philosophy, logic, metaphysics, ethics, aesthetics, and psychology. Heymans himself preferred to use the term psychology when talking about psychology.

==== General psychology ====
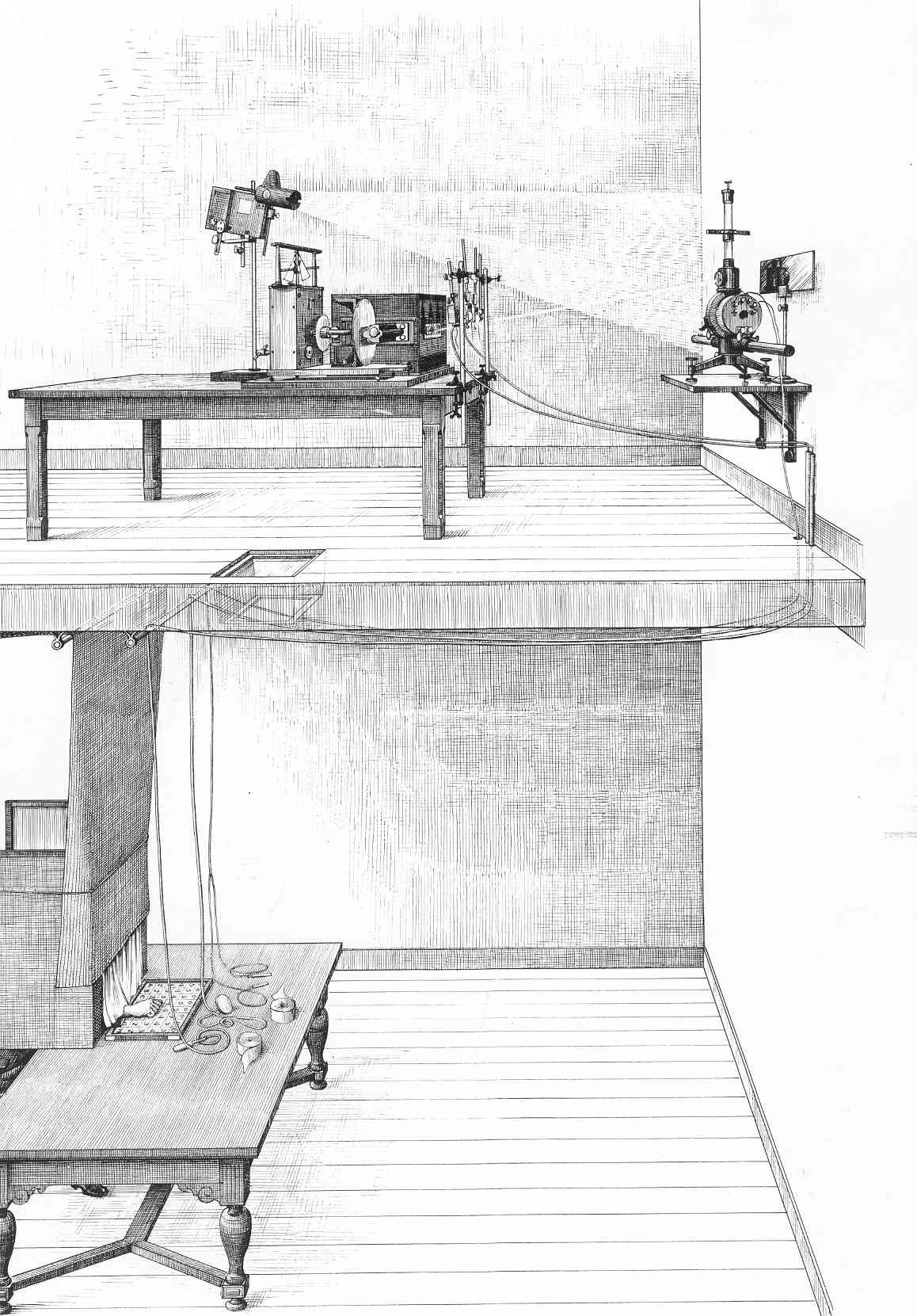
Figure 2. Setup for telepathic experiments

Heymans often compared psychology to physics. He was convinced that laws could be formulated for psychology in the same way as for the natural sciences and therefore did a lot of research into general psychological processes. He was strongly influenced by German psychology. He started doing research into psychological inhibition. An example of this phenomenon is when you have mild pain in your left arm, but then feel a worse pain in your right, the pain in your left arm will disappear. He based his research on earlier results of Weber and Fechner.

Heymans also did a lot of research into visual illusions. The best-known examples are the Müller-Lyer and the Zöllner illusion. He wanted to put all the proposed explanations to the test. He designed various setups in which subjects had to indicate when they thought the lines were of equal length (Müller-Lyer) or were running parallel (Zöllner). He published both studies, that of illusions and psychological inhibition, in the Zeitschrift für Psychologie.

==== Special psychology ====
Whereas general psychology focuses on shared psychological processes, special psychology (or differential psychology) focuses on the differences between people. Here too Heymans has had a major influence. Eysenck, a British personality psychologist, called him, for example, one of the founders of personality psychology. Heymans was in fact the first psychologist to base a typology, a classification of personality types, on empirical research. This typology is known as the Heymans' Cube (see figure 1). It consists of eight types placed on three different dimensions. Heymans based his typology on the biographies of well-known people, such as Goethe and Napoleon, and survey research.

=== Parapsychology ===
At the end of the nineteenth and early twentieth century, there was also a great deal of interest within psychology in parapsychology (then psychological research). Among them were well-known psychologists such as William James, Alfred Binet, Francis Galton, and also Heymans. Between 1920 and 1923, Heymans conducted multiple experiments to investigate telepathy. Figure 2 shows the experimental set-up, in which Van Dam sat behind the curtain and had to pick up signals from the experimenter who in his mind guided the subject's hand.

== Psychological laboratory ==
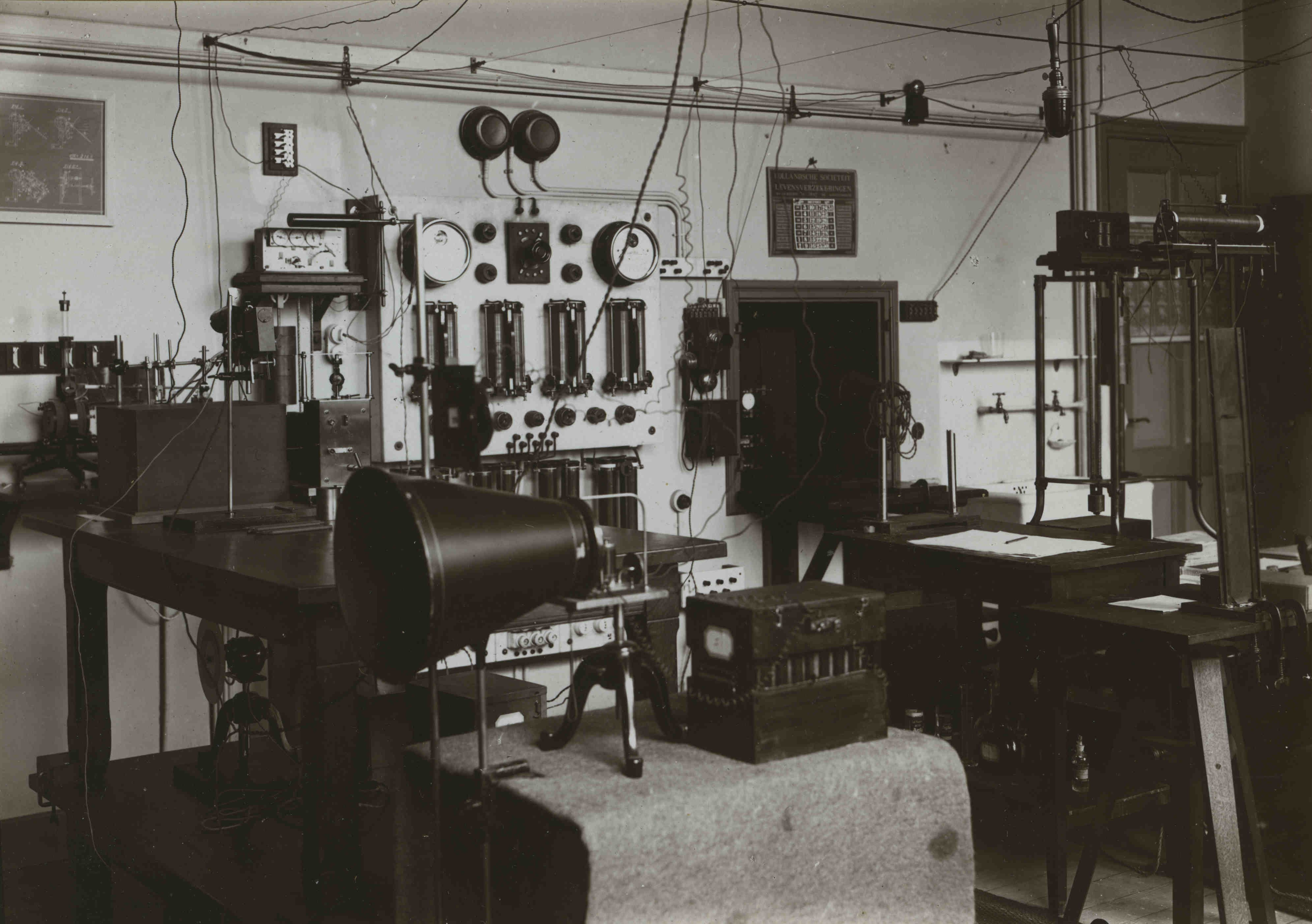
Figure 3. Heymans' psychological laboratory in 1923

Heymans' psychological laboratory started as a room in his house on Stationsstraat in 1892. For the construction of the villa on Ubbo Emmiussingel, they made sure there was a proper place for the laboratory. It was located on the waterfront and had extra thick walls to block out as much noise as possible. Until 1909 Heymans conducted his experiments here using his wife as the primary test subject. Heymans had a large collection of devices for his experiments. They were purchased and made for education and demonstration purposes, and to make psychology education attractive. Most of these devices were intended for sensory perception research.

When in 1906 the Academy Building was largely destroyed by fire, plans for a new building were quickly drawn up. In this new building, there would also be room for Heymans' laboratory. The space that Heymans had at his disposal consisted of a large lecture hall and four workrooms. One of those rooms was specially equipped for visual and auditory experiments. From then on, practicals were also given more often and students had the chance to experiment themselves, by replicating experiments and participating as test subjects.

In 1927 Heymans handed over the management to his former lab assistant and at that time lecturer in pedagogy Henri Brugmans. Until 1956, the lab was located in the Academy Building of the University of Groningen. Since then, the lab has been repurposed into a toilet .

== Publications ==
In his life, Heymans has written a lot of articles and multiple books. Some of the more famous are:

- 1905. Einführung in die Metaphysik, auf Grundlage der Erfahrung
- 1909. De toekomstige eeuw der psychologie. Speech given at his inauguration as rector magnificus of the UG
- 1914. De oorlog en de vredesbeweging
- 1914. Einführung in die Ethik, auf Grundlage der Erfahrung
- 1915. Die Gesetze und Elemente des wissenschaftlichen Denkens, Ein Lehrbuch der Erkenntnistheorie in Grundzügen
- 1915. Het psychisch monisme
