= Heymans' cube =

Concept in psychology

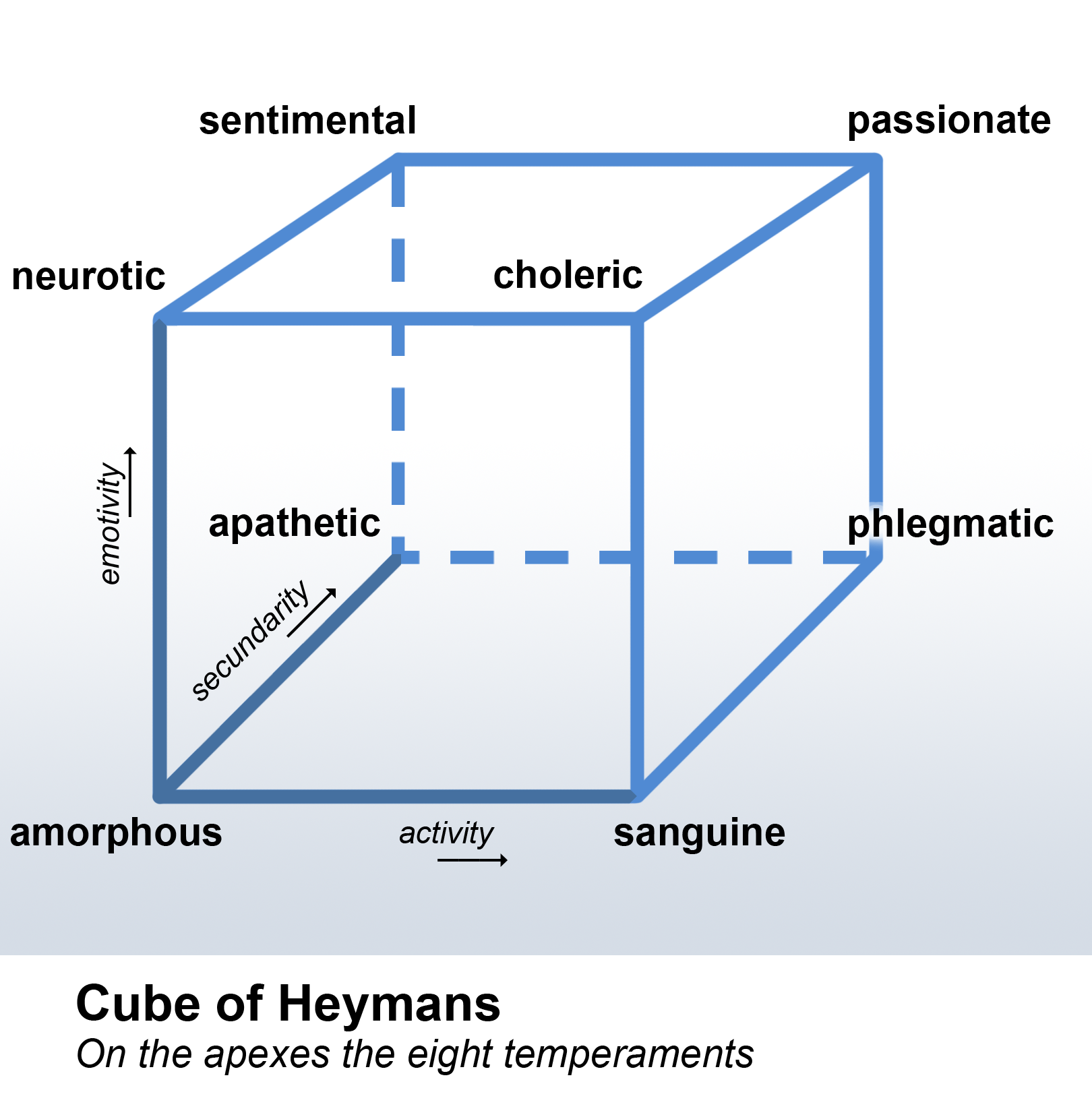

Heymans' cube is a typology of different character types formulated by Gerard Heymans in his book Inleiding tot de Speciale Psychologie (Introduction to Special Psychology). He was the first person to base his typology on empirical research. He used questionnaires he sent to all General Physicians in the Netherlands and went through many biographies of famous people, like Multatuli and Napoleon. He also did research into the differences in, what he called, secondary effects using visual stimulation, like bright light. Based on his research he put people on three dimensions which together formed eight different character types (see figure).

Heymans was influenced by German psychologists and the Ancient Greeks. He, for example, uses three terms also used by Hippocrates and humoral theory.

Heymans' character cube was very popular and had a lasting influence on the later-formed field of personality psychology. Typologies like this constituted the beginning of characterising personality as a unity of psychological traits which can be researched scientifically.
