= Galileo's Error =

2019 book by Philip Goff

Galileo's Error: Foundations for a New Science of Consciousness
- Author: Philip Goff
- Language: English
- Publisher: Pantheon; Vintage
- Publication date: August 6, 2019
- Publication place: United States
- Media type: Print; e-book; audiobook
- Pages: 256
- ISBN: 978-1-5247-4796-1

Galileo's Error: Foundations for a New Science of Consciousness is a 2019 book authored by British philosopher Philip Goff. The book presents a defense of the theory of panpsychism as the solution to the hard problem of consciousness. The title of the book refers to Galileo inaugurating science by dividing the world into two "radically different kinds of entities" — the quantitative characteristics, which became the domain of science, and the qualitative characteristics which are the soul's response to the physical world.

== Synopsis ==
Goff presents the dualist and materialist views on consciousness and proceeds to demonstrate their respective failures to explain consciousness.

=== Dualism ===
Dualism, the idea that consciousness is separate from the physical mind suffers from the apparent lack of unexplained activity in the brain that would be present if it were interacting with a non-physical mind.

=== Materialism ===
With regards to materialism, Goff's critique is based on thought experiments that aim to demonstrate that objective knowledge cannot be extended to encapsulate the subjective experience. Therefore consciousness, which is a subjective experience cannot be explained in terms of the physical brain, which is objective.

=== Panpsychism ===
He then goes on to present panpsychism as what he describes to be "a way of accepting the reality of consciousness" while being "entirely consistent with the facts of empirical science". The book defines panpsychism as the view that "consciousness is a fundamental and ubiquitous feature of reality", and everything, including fundamental particles, has consciousness. That's not to say, however, that everything has human-level conscious. Instead, it's the complex arrangement of trillions of those conscious particles in the brain that brings that forth.
