= Philip Goff (philosopher) =

British philosopher (born 1978)

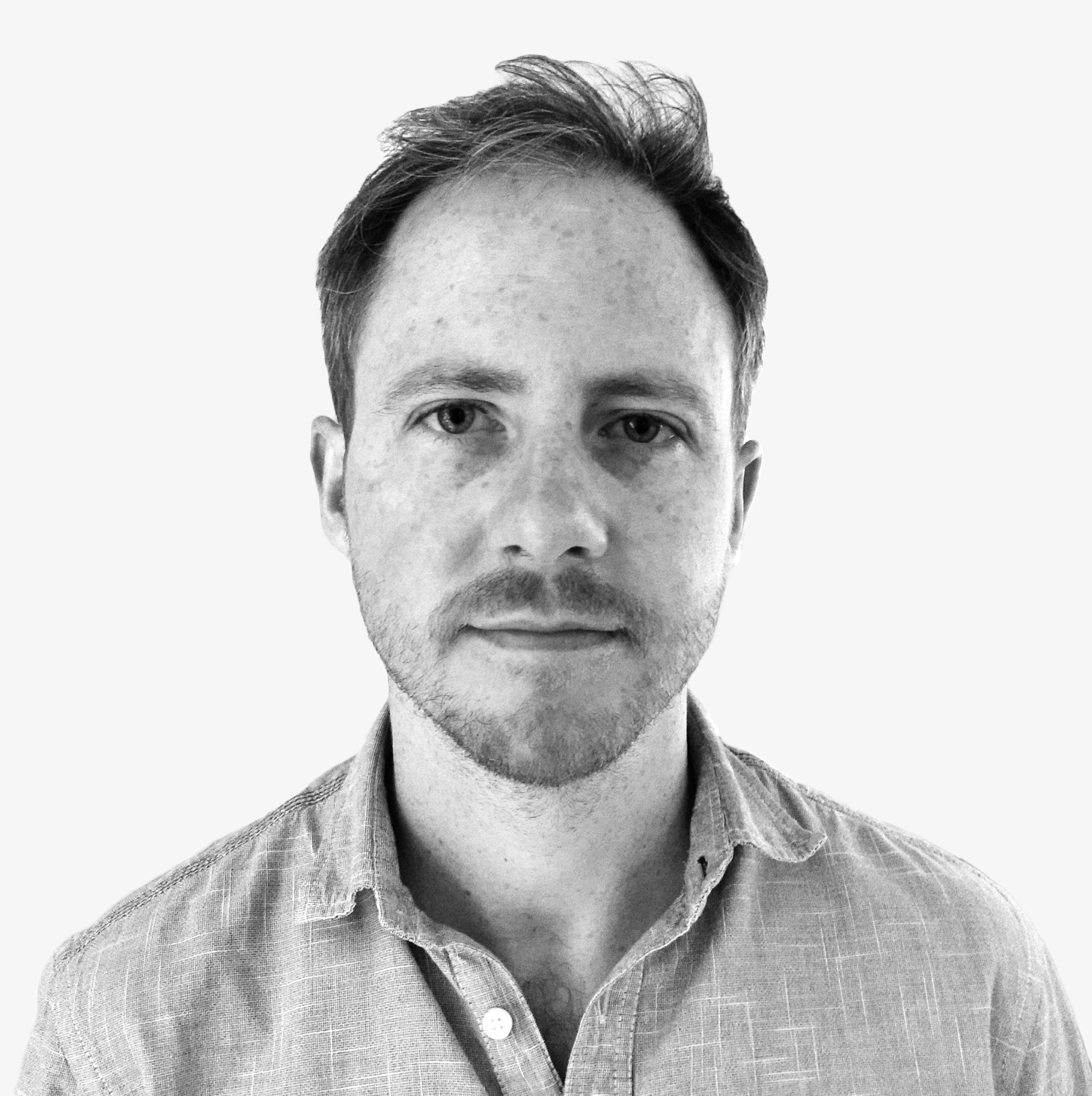
- Goff in 2018
- Born: December 1978 (age 47)
- Spouse: Emma Goff

Education
- Education: University of Leeds (MA); University of Reading (PhD)

Philosophical work
- Era: 21st-century philosophy
- Region: Western philosophy
- School: Analytic philosophy
- Main interests: Philosophy of mind
- Website: philipgoffphilosophy.com

Philip Goff (born 1978) is a British author, panpsychist philosopher, and professor at Durham University whose research focuses on philosophy of mind and consciousness. Specifically, his research focuses on how consciousness can be part of the scientific worldview. Goff holds that materialism is "incoherent" and that dualism leads to "complexity, discontinuity and mystery". Instead, he advocates a "third way", a version of Russellian monism that attempts to account for reality's intrinsic nature by positing that consciousness is a fundamental, ubiquitous feature of the physical world. "The basic commitment is that the fundamental constituents of reality—perhaps electrons and quarks—have incredibly simple forms of experience."

== Biography ==
=== Early life and education ===
At the age of 14, he declined to undergo Catholic confirmation and came to negatively associate philosophical dualism with his religious upbringing.

As a philosophy undergraduate at the University of Leeds, he felt he had to choose between dualism and materialism; he became a committed materialist.

=== Career ===
Goff got his PhD at University of Reading under Galen Strawson, one of the few proponents of panpsychism at that time, who was rediscovering Bertrand Russell's and Arthur Eddington's earlier work on monism. Goff then did postdoctoral work at the Centre for Consciousness at the Australian National University.

Goff was at The University of Hertfordshire and King's College London. He was an Associate Professor of Philosophy at Central European University and the Department of Philosophy, University of Birmingham.

Goff is a professor in the Department of Philosophy at Durham University.

In 2014, Goff attended the Consciousness Cruise off Greenland, sponsored by Dmitry Volkov and the Moscow Center for Consciousness Studies. It was a floating conference that featured prominent philosophers of mind such as David Chalmers, Paul Churchland, Patricia Churchland, Andy Clark, Daniel Dennett, Keith Frankish, Nicholas Humphrey, Jesse Prinz, and Derk Pereboom. Goff gave a talk about his developing position on and defense of panpsychism.

Goff and Keith Frankish, a colleague who defends the opposing view of illusionism, started the YouTube channel "Mind Chat" in 2021, interviewing scientists and philosophers of consciousness such as Tim O'Connor, Janet Levin, Christof Koch, Anil Seth, and Helen Yetter-Chappel.

== Views ==
=== Panpsychism ===
Galileo inaugurated modern science by dividing the world into the quantitative realm of science and, on the other hand, the qualitative realm of subjective experience. While this division ushered in the modern scientific era, Goff argues, it likely made it impossible that scientific naturalism could ever account for consciousness without either eliminating its qualitative aspects or falling victim to the liabilities of dualism. Goff was unconvinced by David Chalmers's and Kelvin McQueen's attempts to establish a type of naturalistic dualism based on quantum mechanics. Though Goff thinks the idea deserves more attention, he concluded that even if dualism is compatible with science, we should be wary of it on the grounds that it is less simple than other theories of consciousness.

Goff argued that the qualities of consciousness cannot be captured in the purely quantitative vocabulary of physical sciences. Though the optimistic materialist may hope that further or more detailed quantitative descriptions might someday explain why and how a purely physical brain produces intrinsic personal experiences, Goff used a series of a priori thought experiments to argue that this is likely a false hope. In his book Galileo's Error, Goff used Frank Jackson's Knowledge Argument to show that a purely physical description of the world is not complete. Next, he used Chalmers's Conceivability Argument to argue that materialism cannot possibly be true. Goff concluded, "Materialists who claim both that reality can be exhaustively described in the objective vocabulary of physical science and that there are subjective properties are quite simply contradicting themselves."

Instead Goff supports a "third way", a version of Russellian monism that attempts to account for reality's intrinsic nature by positing that consciousness is a fundamental, ubiquitous feature of the physical world. "The basic commitment is that the fundamental constituents of reality—perhaps electrons and quarks—have incredibly simple forms of experience." Because the claim is that consciousness is fundamental, Goff's view does not provide an account of consciousness that reduces it to something else. He says "it is a prejudice of materialism to suppose that this is obligatory."

Though the idea of electrons having experience is counterintuitive to most people, Goff clarified that most modern panpsychists do not believe that any clump of matter results in complex consciousness. "Most panpsychists will deny that your socks are conscious, while asserting that they are ultimately composed of things that are conscious."

==== Response ====
While panpsychism remained a minority view amongst professional philosophers, since the work of Galen Strawson and Goff in the 21st century and their rediscovery of Russell's and Arthur Eddington's 1920's work on consciousness, it's become more widely discussed and debated. Goff has debated panpsychism against thinkers as diverse as physicalist Massimo Pigliucci and idealist Bernardo Kastrup.

In 2021, the Journal of Consciousness Studies published 20 essays by scientists, philosophers, and theologians responding to Goff's work. Goff published a response essay in the same issue.

=== Environmentalism ===
Goff sees hope in panpsychism to solve human indifference to the climate crisis. Noting that Naomi Klein blames dualism for our degradation of the environment, Goff speculates that children reared in a panpsychist tradition would be less indifferent to and more protective of the environment.

=== Politics ===
Goff calls himself a "vigorous opponent of neoliberalism" and a "huge fan of taxation". He has argued against the libertarian idea that taxation is theft, on the basis that people do not own their pretax income. In 2011 Goff instigated a protest against singer Bono that involved inflating a balloon in the front row of his concert to draw attention to Bono's band U2's financial behaviour, which Goff said amounted to Bono being a "tax rogue". Goff has written that Bono's behaviour, as revealed in the Paradise Papers, is part of a general trend of the wealthy moving their money to tax havens at developing countries' expense (citing Christian Aid's estimate that this amounts to $160 billion annually).

=== Religion ===
On his website, Goff called himself a "practising agnostic", writing that Christianity might not be true but that he finds its practice enriching. His ideas relate to various philosophical projects such as pantheism, Christian atheism, and religious naturalism. But in 2024, Goff announced his conversion to a "heretical form of Christianity". He said that though he describes himself as a Christian, he is only "close to 50%" sure that his version of Christianity is true.

== Publications ==
Goff has published over 46 academic papers, 10 book reviews, guest edited an issue of Philosophy Now and written over 35 articles in the popular press in outlets such as The Guardian, The Times Literary Supplement. He has appeared in 70 podcasts and various debates. In 2021, the Journal of Consciousness Studies featured Goff's work as the topic of 20 essays by scientists, philosophers, and theologians. Goff responded to their essays in the same journal.

== Personal life ==
Goff plays in a rock band, writing on his website that "we still gig occasionally".

== Books ==
- Consciousness and Fundamental Reality (2017) ISBN 0190677015
- Galileo's Error: Foundations for a New Science of Consciousness (2019) ISBN 0525564772
- Is Consciousness Everywhere? (2022), Goff's reply to responses to Galileo's Error
- Why? The Purpose of the Universe (Oxford University Press, 2023)
