= William Seager (philosopher) =

Canadian philosopher (born 1952)

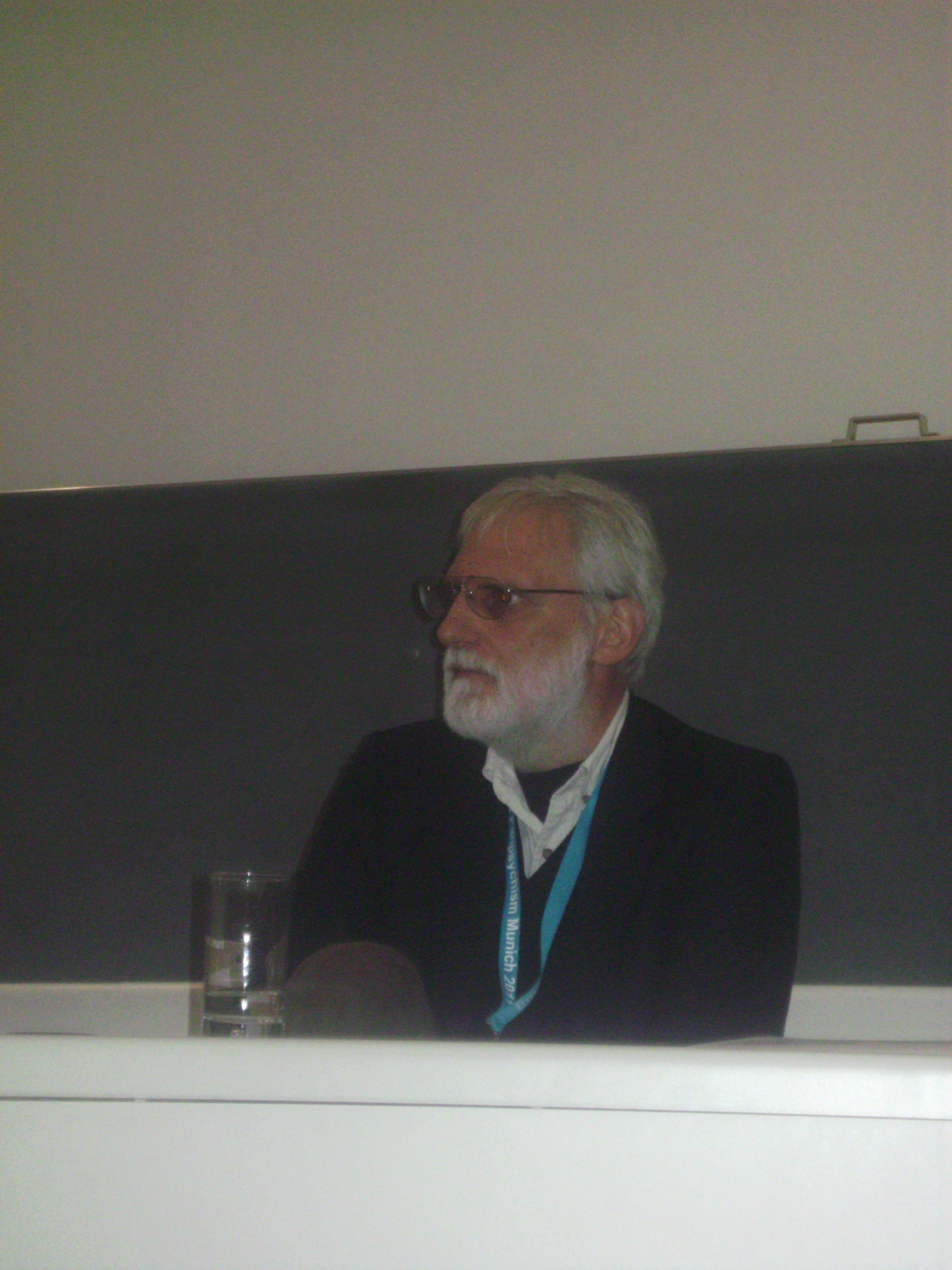
- Seager in 2011
- Born: William Edward Seager; April 11, 1952 (age 74); Edmonton, Alberta
- Education: University of Alberta; University of Toronto
- Occupations: Philosopher, professor at the University of Toronto Scarborough

William Edward Seager (born April 11, 1952 in Edmonton, Alberta) is a Canadian philosopher. Now retired, he spent his career as a professor of philosophy at the University of Toronto Scarborough. His academic specialties lie in the philosophy of mind and the philosophy of science.

He received his B.A. (1973) and his M.A. (1976) from the University of Alberta. Seager received his Ph.D. in 1981 from the University of Toronto under the supervision of Ronald de Sousa, with a thesis on "Materialism and the Foundations of Representation."

He was Associate Editor of the Canadian Journal of Philosophy between 2003 and 2013.

In 2023, he was made a Fellow of the Royal Society of Canada.

== Publications ==
=== Books ===
- The Leibniz Lexicon: A Dual Concordance to Leibniz's Philosophische Schriften. Hildesheim: Olms, 1988. (With R. McRae, R. Finster, G. Hunter, M. Miles.)
- Metaphysics of Consciousness. London: Routledge, 1991.
- Theories of Consciousness. London: Routledge, 1999.
- Natural Fabrications: Science, Emergence, and Consciousness. Berlin: Springer Frontier Collection, 2012.
- Theories of Consciousness 2nd edition. London: Routledge, 2016.
- The Routledge Handbook of Panpsychism (editor) London: Routledge, 2019.
