= Stephen Hetherington =

Australian philosopher

Emeritus Professor Stephen Hetherington FAHA
- Born: Stephen Cade Hetherington; 1959 (age 66–67); Sydney, New South Wales, Australia
- Spouse: Parveen Kaur Seehra (m. 1990)
- Family: Norman Hetherington (father); Margaret Hetherington, née Owrid, née Purnell (mother)
- Awards: Fellow Australian Academy of the Humanities (2011)

Education
- Education: Mosman Public School; Neutral Bay Primary School; Fort Street High School
- Alma mater: University of Sydney (1977–1980), B.A. (Honours I), 1981; University of Oxford, New College, B. Phil., 1983; University of Pittsburgh, M.A., 1986, Ph.D., 1987
- Academic advisors: Joseph Lee Camp, Jr.

Philosophical work
- School: Analytic philosophy
- Institutions: West Virginia University (1987–1990); University of New South Wales (1990–2021)
- Language: English
- Main interests: epistemology, metaphysics, Gettier problem
- Website: shetherington9.wixsite.com/my-site-6

Stephen Cade Hetherington FAHA (born 1959) is an Australian analytic philosopher specialising in epistemology and, to a lesser extent, metaphysics. He is an emeritus professor in the School of Humanities and Languages at the University of New South Wales, a prolific author, and served as editor-in-chief of the Australasian Journal of Philosophy from December 2013 to March 2022.

== Family ==
=== Early life ===
The son of the Australian artist, caricaturist, cartoonist, and puppeteer, Norman Frederick Hetherington OAM (1921–2010), and Margaret "Peggy" Hetherington (1923–2022), née Owrid, née Purnell, Stephen Cade Hetherington was born at Sydney in 1959.

He grew up in Mosman, New South Wales, where his father's puppetry collection and workshop were located in the basement beneath the family residence.

=== Marriage ===
He married the artist Parveen Kaur Seehra in 1990.

== Education ==
He attended the opportunity classes (years 5 and 6) at Neutral Bay Public School and, then, attended the academically selective Fort Street High School in Sydney (as had his father, Norman).

He received his tertiary education from the University of Sydney, from New College at the University of Oxford, and from the University of Pittsburgh:

- University of Sydney: Bachelor of Arts (B.A.) (Honours Class I), 1981.
- University of Oxford, New College: Bachelor of Philosophy (B.Phil.), 1983.
- University of Pittsburgh: Master of Arts (M.A.), 1986.
- University of Pittsburgh: Doctor of Philosophy (Ph.D.), 1987.

== Puppeteer ==
In the four years (1977 to 1980) that he studied at the University of Sydney, Hetherington not only operated marionettes part-time in his father's special, highly successful dental health programme for children ("Smiley's Good Teeth Puppet Theatre").

== Author ==
His first four publications were written while he was still a student; the first two (Hetherington, 1983a; 1984a), written as an undergraduate student, were derived from papers written for his Honours-year coursework at the University of Sydney, and the other two (Hetherington, 1984b; 1988) were written as a post-graduate student during his time at the University of Pittsburgh.

He became a well-respected prolific author in a wide range of philosophical domains, especially epistemology:

Stephen Hetherington is a Professor Emeritus of Philosophy at the University of New South Wales whose key research interests are in epistemology and metaphysics. With several monographs and edited collections and more than 100 articles, he has earned an international reputation for his revivification of epistemology. He has also produced several lively works introducing students to the history and current frontiers of epistemology, which have been translated into a number of languages and have been used for teaching in widely dispersed countries — the secret of their success lies partly in the way he includes his own original research, in enlivening the exposition of traditional debates.
(The Australian Academy of the Humanities.)

== Academic ==
He commenced his academic career in 1987, as an Assistant Professor of Philosophy at West Virginia University; and in 1990 he transferred to the philosophy department of the University of New South Wales where he remained until his retirement in late 2020.

== Editor-in-chief ==
From December 2013 until March 2022 he was the editor-in-chief of the Australasian Journal of Philosophy, a prestigious English-language philosophy journal continuously published since 1923.

He is the editor-in-chief of the Cambridge University Press Elements in Epistemology series and, also, the Bloomsbury Publishing Critical Introductions to Contemporary Epistemology series.

== Awards ==
In 2011 he was elected a fellow of the Australian Academy of the Humanities (FAHA).
