= Jack Lusby =

Australian writer and pilot (born 1913)

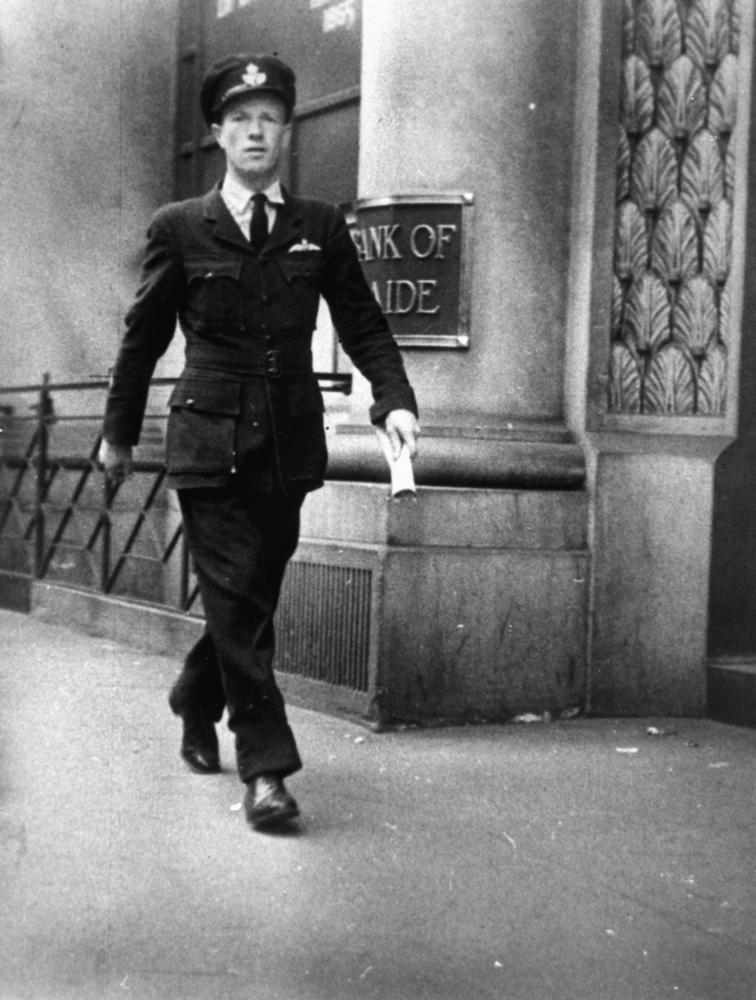
Jack Lusby, RAAF.

John Vivian Fitzhenry Lusby (1913–1980), known as "Jack", was an Australian cartoonist, journalist and short story writer who served as a pilot in the Royal Australian Air Force during World War II.

== Career and works ==
Lusby was born at Drummoyne in Sydney in 1913. His parents were John Lusby and Caroline Lusby (née Fitzhenry), who had six children, of whom he was the eldest: John, Maurice, Gwenyth, Robert, Judith and Elizabeth. His father was a school teacher, whose job kept the family moving from country town to country town until they settled in Sydney in time for the Great Depression.

Jack Lusby was a successful and prolific Australian black and white artist, cartoonist and short-story writer. Lusby's cartoons appeared in The Bulletin from around 1936 and he worked as head cartoonist for Brisbane's The Courier-Mail from 1945 to 1951. He also contributed works to the Minties moments series.

His early short stories appeared in Smith’s Weekly and The Bulletin under the pseudonym, 'Freddie'. His stories were later republished in anthologies including Coast to Coast, 1959–60; The Bulletin Christmas Edition, 1958; The Penguin Book of Australian Short Stories (Vol 2); Selected Australian Stories (1963); Australian Short Stories, Second Series (1963); and Short Stories from the Second World War (1982). Maria Lusby Simms edited, transcribed and provided military and historical context for Jack's war diaries. Under the title of Jack's War, three volumes of the diaries were published by James Oglethorpe on the 3 Squadron website in 2012.

Jack Lusby and his wife had three children: Maria Lusby Simms, Christopher Lusby (deceased), Anita Lusby.

== War service ==
Lusby enlisted in the Royal Australian Air Force in 1941, was posted with the No. 3 Squadron RAAF to fight in North Africa and Middle East, and was 'loaned out' to No. 458 Squadron. Returning to Australia in February 1943 he was posted to Port Pirie in South Australia where he trained novice bombers and gunners. From April 1944 he was posted to Bankstown Air Base in Sydney where he became a test pilot for Supermarine Mark VIII in Sydney and at Amberley Air Base in Brisbane. During the war, Lusby married his wife Sheila (née Drummond).

Jack's siblings also gave distinguished service in the war effort: brother Maurice Lusby was sent to Washington and London as Australian Scientific Research Liaison Officer. Sister Gwen commanded the Medical Division at Concord Military Hospital - one of the first women Majors in the Australian Army. Youngest brother Robert Lusby was captured with the 2/30th Battalion at Singapore and died on the Burma Railway, while sister Judith was recruited into naval intelligence with the WRANS.

== Selected works ==
- Jack's War: A Pilot's World War II Journal, published by Maria Simms, 2012
- Thumbs Up, published in Sydney by Frank Johnson in 1941.
- Grin with Jack Lusby published in Sydney by Frank Johnson in 1945.
- The Penguin Book of Australian Short Stories (Vol 2)
- Short Stories from the Second World War, edited by Dan Davin, published by Oxford University Press, London, 1982.
- More than forty short stories were published in The Bulletin.

== See also ==
- Gwen Fleming
- Justin Fleming
- Rosemary Follett
