= Solanum asymmetriphyllum =

Scientific classification
- Kingdom: Plantae
- Clade: Tracheophytes
- Clade: Angiosperms
- Clade: Eudicots
- Clade: Asterids
- Order: Solanales
- Family: Solanaceae
- Genus: Solanum
- Species: S. asymmetriphyllum

Binomial name
- Solanum asymmetriphyllum Specht

Synonyms
- Solanum asymmetriphyllum var. longiflorum Specht

Species of plant

Solanum asymmetriphyllum is a species of flowering plant in the family Solanaceae, native to the Northern Territory of Australia. Found only on sandstone, it is functionally dioecious.
