= Fred McCarthy (archaeologist) =

Australian anthropologist and archaeologist

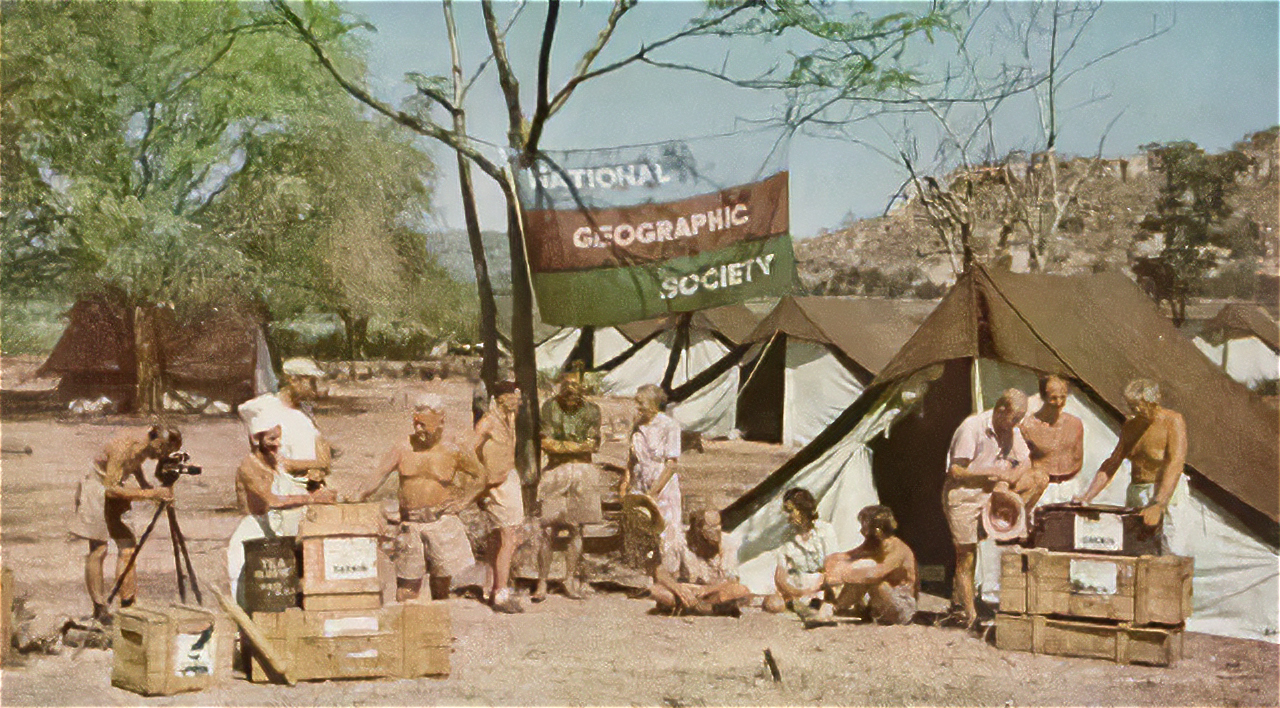
Fred McCarthy (5th from left) at the 1948 Arnhem Expedition

Frederick David McCarthy (13 August 1905 – 18 November 1997) was an Australian anthropologist and archaeologist. He worked at the Australian Museum in Sydney and was Foundation Principal of the Australian Institute of Aboriginal Studies, with interests covering Australian archaeology, museology and Aboriginal rock art.

== Life and career ==
'Fred' McCarthy was born on 13 August 1905, in Crystal Street in Petersham, to Jane (née Fyfe) and tram driver Charles Henry McCarthy, an English-Scottish immigrant couple. He was one of four children and had an identical twin sibling. Shortly after his birth, his family relocated to Leichhardt, where he received his education within the local area. He completed his studies at Annandale Junior Technical School. During his youth, he displayed a strong interest in rowing, swimming, and bushwalking.

In 1920, at the age of 14, he started work at the Australian Museum as a library clerk; his neighbour, Lucas, worked at the Museum as a carpenter and told him about the position. In 1930, he moved to a position in the Department of Birds and Reptiles. His interest in anthropology grew, leading him and a colleague to conduct an excavation at Burrill Lake on the south coast of the state in 1930. This excavation served as the basis for his first published paper, which appeared in the Australian Museum Magazine the following year. Progressing in his career, he was promoted to the role of scientific cadet in 1932 and was assigned to assist William Walford Thorpe, the curator of anthropology. Following Thorpe's passing in September, Elsie Bramell assumed the position of scientific assistant in February 1933, briefly holding seniority over McCarthy until he was promoted to the same level the next year.

Within 12 years of starting at the museum he rose to be Curator of Ethnology, (Note: He was first appointed as assistant to W.W. Thorpe, who was untrained and never catalogued anything. Thorpe died within a few months and McCarthy assumed the senior role, with a huge backlog of neglected artifacts requiring his taxonomic attention.) a position he held until 1964, when he was appointed foundational principal of the Australian Institute of Aboriginal Studies. Lacking formal qualifications he then undertook a degree in anthropology at the University of Sydney in 1933 under A. P. Elkin. He graduated with a thesis entitled The material culture of eastern Australia, a study of factors entering into its composition.

McCarthy married a co-worker, Elsie Bramell in 1941. She was forced to resign her position at the Australian Museum as part of a policy not to allow couples to work together in the same department, resulting in the anthropology department being reduced to one person, her position not being replaced until 1961. She continued to assist in McCarthy's fieldwork. Fred and Elsie were the first professionally trained anthropologists and archaeologists in any museum in Australia. In 1941 McCarthy was promoted to First Class Scientific Assistant and then appointed as curator of the anthropological collections.

In private life, McCarthy was a keen sportsman and bushwalker. He retired in 1971 and was awarded an Honorary Doctorate of Sciences from the Australian National University in recognition of his achievements.

== Work ==
In the underfinanced years of the depression McCarthy undertook, together with a volunteer team he organized, to survey at his own expense, and in his free time, numerous prehistoric art galleries, recording and sketching their contents before urban sprawl destroyed extensive remains of Sydney's aboriginal heritage. They would catch trains over the weekends to areas like the Hawkesbury River, around Cowan, Berowra, Mangrove Creek and the Georges River. This resulted in the compilation of a massive manuscript on Sydney's regional indigenous art which, together with his diaries, he left to AIATSIS after his retirement.

McCarty's diaries of his visit to Indonesia in 1937-8 and the 3rd Congress of Prehistorians of the Far East, in Singapore are held by the AIATSIS Library.

Recognition of his achievements in both anthropology and archaeology led to an invitation in 1948 to participate in the 1948 American-Australian Scientific Expedition to Arnhem Land. His work with Margaret McArthur at Oenpelli (present-day Gunbalanya) was to lead to a groundbreaking study on time factors in aboriginal women's quest for food. A further opportunity for fieldwork came up in 1958 when he obtained a Wenner-Gren Foundation grant to pursue research on aboriginal art in north western Australia. In 1961 he went to the Cape York Peninsula and studied Aboriginal clan dancing at Aurukun. His assiduous investigations resulted in the close description of some 43 totemic dancing events in two large volumes, and the collection of an important number of ornaments used in them.

In 1957 he published one of the first thorough treatises on Australian aborigines, Australia's Aborigines, their life and culture.

== Publications ==
McCarthy's output of papers was extensive. He published some 300 articles and books between 1933 and 1988. Books include:

- F. D. McCarthy, Australian Aboriginal Decorative Art, (1938)
- F. D. McCarthy, Elsie McCarthy, H.V.V. Noone The Stone Implements of Australia (1946): a standard text for aboriginal stone tools for many decades.
- F. D. McCarthy, Australian Aboriginal Rock Art. (1958)

At his death, he left, unpublished a 900-page manuscript entitled Artists of the sandstone, an ethnographical study of contact with whites in Sydney in 1788.

== Awards ==
He was awarded an honorary Doctor of Science degree from the Australian National University.

== Bibliography ==
- Attenbrow, V. J.; Khan, K. (1994). "FD McCarthy: His Work and Legacy at the Australian Museum". In Sullivan, Marjorie; Brockwell, Sally; Webb, Ann (eds.). Archaeology in the North. Darwin: ANU North Australian Research Unit. pp. 5–16.
- Attenbrow, Val (2008). "Ethnographic and Archaeological Collections by FD McCarthy in the Australian Museum". In Peterson, Nicolas; Allen, Lindy; Hamby, Louise (eds.). The Makers and Making of Indigenous Australian Museum Collections. Melbourne University Press Academic Monographs. pp. 472–507. ISBN 978-0-522-85568-5.
- Mulvaney, D.J. (1993). Specht, Jim (ed.). "Sesqui-centenary to bicentenary: reflections on a museologist" (PDF). Records of the Australian Museum. F.D. McCarthy, Commemorative Papers (Archaeology, Anthropology, Rock Art). Supplement 17. Australian Museum: 17–24. doi:10.3853/j.0812-7387.17.1993.56.
