= St George Girls High School =

St George Girls' High School

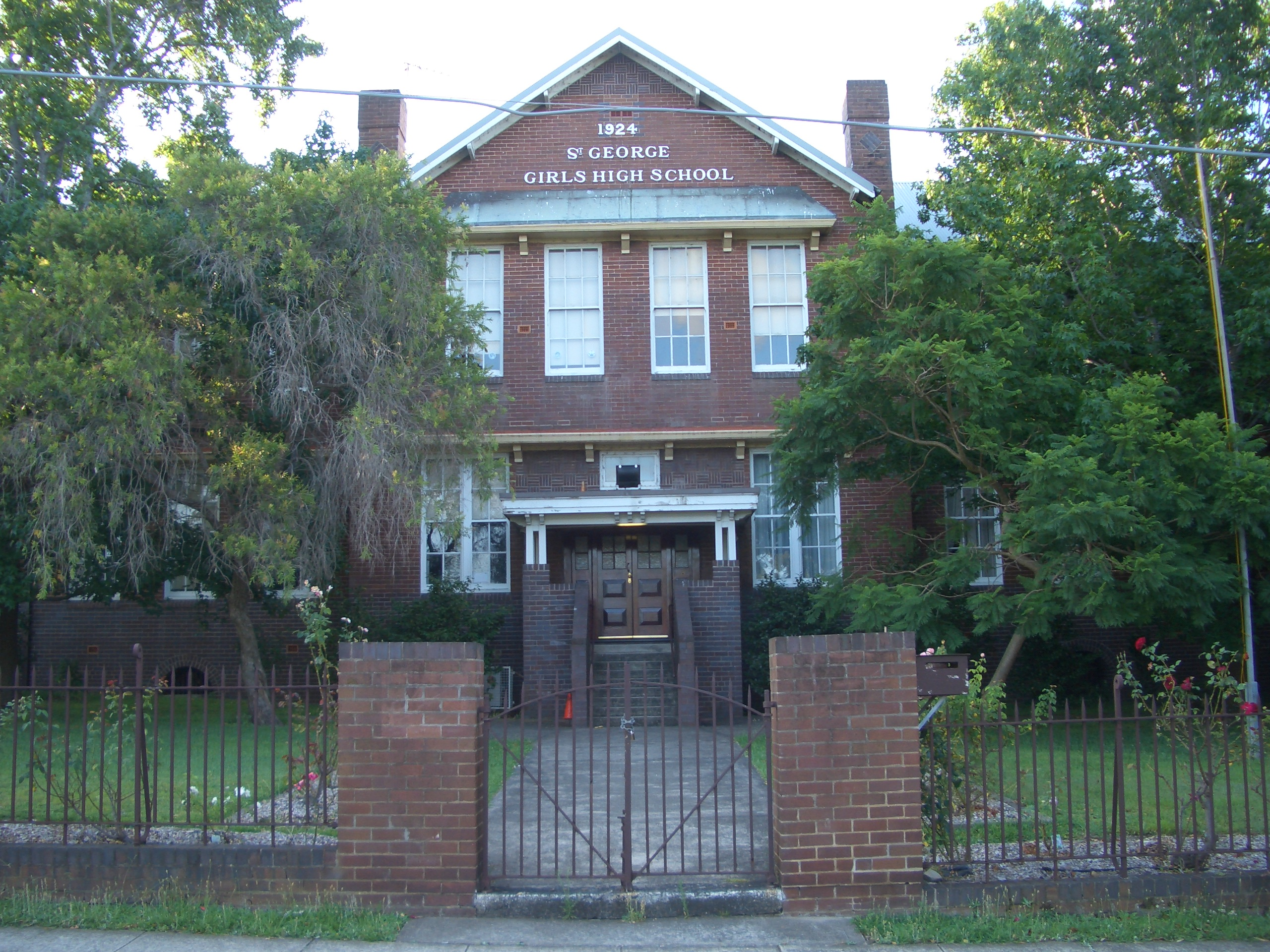
- St George Girls' High School, in 2007

Location
- Victoria Street, Kogarah, St George region, Sydney, New South Wales; Australia; 33°57′32″S 151°8′9″E

Information
- Type: Government-funded single-sex academically selective secondary day school
- Motto: French: Dieu et Droit (God and Right)
- Established: 1916; 110 years ago
- Educational authority: New South Wales Department of Education
- Principal: Betty Romeo
- Years: 7–12
- Gender: Girls Single-sex education
- Enrolment: c. 936 (2021)
- Campus: Urban
- Colours: Red, white and navy blue
- Brother School: Sydney Technical High School
- Website: stgeorgegi-h.schools.nsw.gov.au

St George Girls' High School (SGGHS) is a government-funded, single-sex, selective, secondary day school for girls, located in Kogarah, in the southern suburbs of Sydney, New South Wales, Australia.

Established in 1916 and operated by the New South Wales Department of Education, the school currently caters for approximately 920 students from Year 7 to Year 12. For first year entry, students must sit the Selective High Schools Test and are offered admission into the school based on academic merit.

== History ==
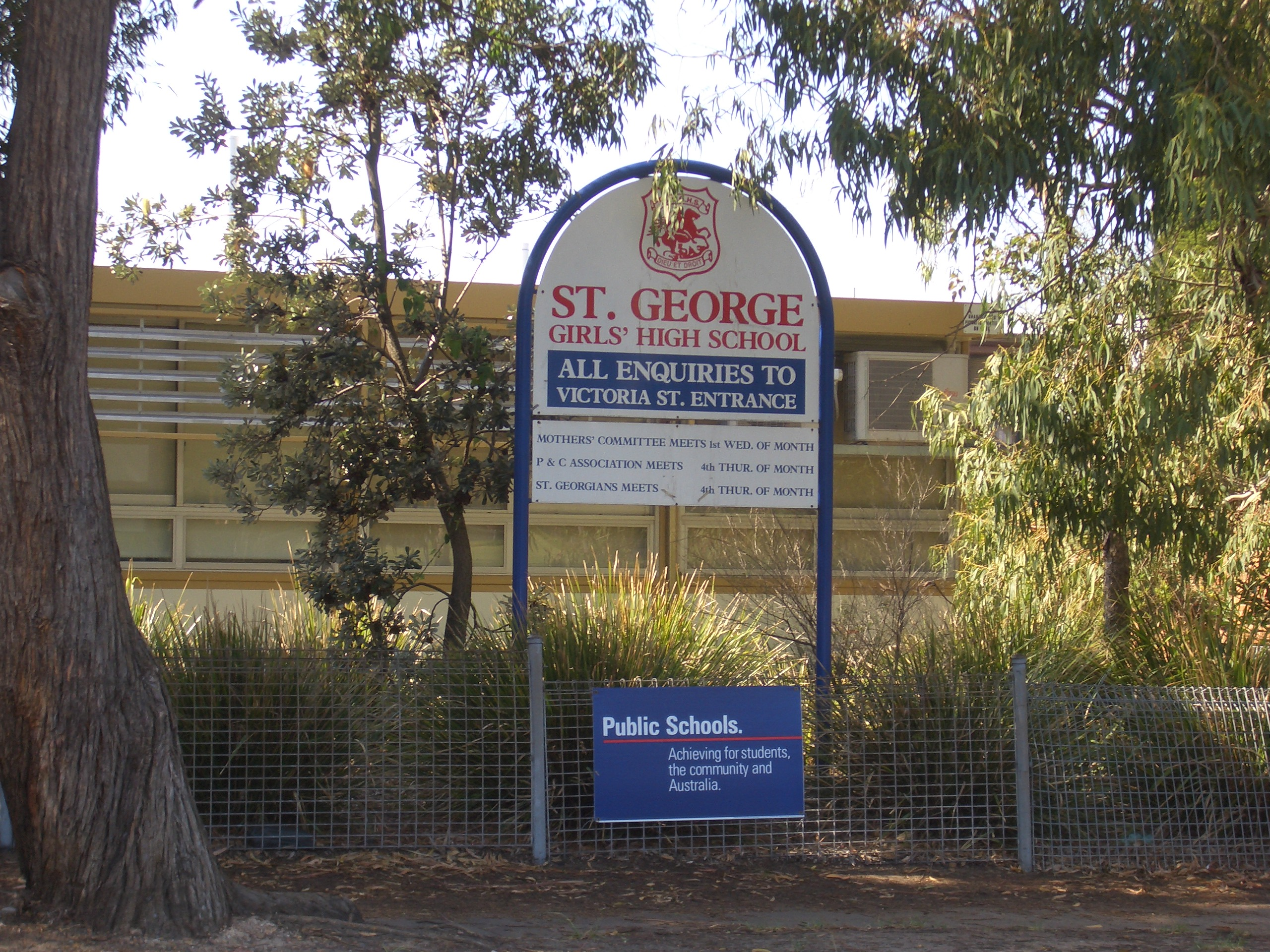
Entrance to the school, in April 2007

In June 1913, it was decided that Kogarah would be a suitable site for a new high school. On 31 October 1914, the land occupied by the cottage ‘Harrow Villa’ was purchased from its owner. This cottage, with portable buildings added, became the temporary school site. SGGHS officially opened in February 1916 with 143 students and nine teachers.

== Annual events ==
Important annual events on the St George calendar include:

- School orientation day
- Open day
- Year 12 Formal
- Year 12 Graduation Ceremony
- Swimming and Athletics Carnivals
- The Walkathon
- SRC Week
- Drama Night, showcasing the talents of Drama students
- Senior Drama Night, showcasing talents of Year 12 Drama
- 'Inspired' Night, a textiles and design fashion parade
- The Summer Music Festival in conjunction with the Multicultural Food Festival
- Gala Music Festival
- SRC School Dance (with Sydney Technical High School)
- The "Listen" concerts, which include the Stage Band, Orchestra and Concert Band
- The "Sing" concerts, which comprise the Vocal Ensemble and the Singing Tutorial girls

== Organisations ==
The School has four school organisations which provide support to the school:

- P&C Association – St George Girls High School Parents & Citizen' Association takes an active interest in the welfare and education of students. When possible, they have a guest speaker.
- St Georgians – The St Georgians is the association for ex-students of the school to meet regularly.
- Prefects – At SGGHS, there are 15 School Prefects, of them are two Vice Captains and one School Captain. These students are nominated and voted by their fellow Year 12 peers and lead in the planning events for their cohort and the wider school community.
- Student Representative Council (SRC) – SGGHS has an active Student Representative Council (SRC). Students from each year elect representatives from their class to represent them at SRC meetings. The SRC consists of four Year 11 students selected by the students of the school. In the past, the SRC has participated in charities such as Daffodil Day, Jeans for Genes day and Pink Ribbon day as well as fundraising activities such as the Walkathon, Gelato Days and Mufti Days. Money raised from school fundraising activities is used for improvements within the school. Recent SRC projects include planting of trees for shade, purchasing teaching resources in the school and providing additional seating arrangements around the school quadrangles.

== Associated schools ==
Although St George Girls High School is an all-girls school, Sydney Technical High School is often referred to as their male counterpart. Being the 'Brother School' of St George Girls High School, Sydney Technical High School often engages in joint SRC fundraising activities. Examples of these include SRC school dances, the St George vs. Sydney Tech netball game during SRC week, as well as P&C meetings. Each schools' ISCF Group (called Lighthouse from St George and SALT from Sydney Tech) regularly join to become Lightly Salted.

== Notable alumni ==
Notable alumnae are referred to as Old Girls.

=== Entertainment, media and the arts ===
- Van Badham – columnist for The Guardian, commentator, playwright and author
- Susien Chong – Fashion designer (Lover label)
- Eleanor Hall – ABC journalist
- Brenna Harding – Logie Award winning Actress. Has been in several TV shows, including Puberty Blues, My Place, and Packed to the Rafters
- Linda Marigliano – Radio host on national radio station Triple J, presenting the Good Nights program.
- Elizabeth Minchin – Professor of classics at the Australian National University
- Christina Stead – Australian novelist. Stead's novel, The Man Who Loved Children was heralded as a forgotten 20th-century "masterpiece" by American author Jonathan Franzen in The New York Times, who compared her to James Joyce and William Faulkner.
- Fiona Wright – award-winning essayist and poet

=== Medicine and sciences ===
- Elsie Bramell – anthropologist and early advocate for preservation of Indigenous artefacts; school captain in 1927; first person with a university degree and the first woman to be employed by the Australian Museum in its Anthropology Department.
- Patricia Brennan AM – was a medical missionary, wife and mother, television broadcaster, forensic physician, haematology registrar at Prince of Wales Hospital, physician and surgeon at the Sudan Interior Mission Hospital in Jos, Nigeria, and Galmi surgical and obstetric hospital in Niger.
- Julie Campbell – a cell biologist and is recognised as a world leader in the field of smooth muscle biology.
- Lady Rita Cornforth – a chemist and the wife of Nobel Prize recipient Sir John Warcup Cornforth. They collaborated on a total of 41 papers that focused on enzyme stereochemistry.
- Mary Gwenyth (Gwen) Fleming – one of the first women Doctors to pass through the University of Sydney, graduating with a Bachelor of Medicine and Bachelor of Surgery in 1939. Fleming was the first female Major in the Royal Australian Army Medical Corps and her specialty was thoracic medicine. In 1945 Gwen was one of the first women admitted as a member of the Royal Australasian College of Physicians and in 1973, she was made a Fellow.
- Jean Sinclair (Clair) Isbister OBE – a pioneer in the development of hospital and outpatient services for mothers and babies, particularly in the area of childbirth practices and post-natal care. Her epidemiological studies at the Royal North Shore Hospital and Tresillian led to the establishment of numerous programs for mothers, babies and the care of children.

=== Sports ===
- Michelle Ford – Olympic gold medallist (freestyle swimming) in the Moscow 1980 games

== See also ==
- List of Government schools in New South Wales
- List of selective high schools in New South Wales
