= Acacia mountfordiae =

Mountford's wattle

Scientific classification
- Kingdom: Plantae
- Clade: Tracheophytes
- Clade: Angiosperms
- Clade: Eudicots
- Clade: Rosids
- Order: Fabales
- Family: Fabaceae
- Subfamily: Caesalpinioideae
- Clade: Mimosoid clade
- Genus: Acacia
- Species: A. mountfordiae

Binomial name
- Acacia mountfordiae Specht
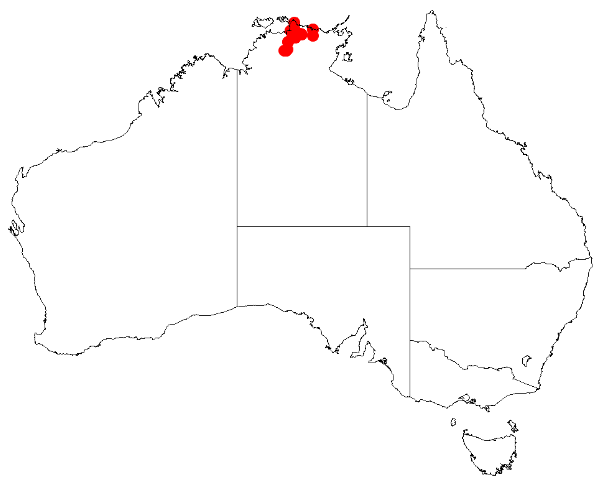
- Occurrence data from AVH

Synonyms
- Acacia mountfordae Specht orth. var.; Racosperma mountfordiae (Specht) Pedley

Species of legume

Habit in Kakadu National Park

Acacia mountfordiae, commonly known as Mountford's wattle, is a species of flowering plant in the family Fabaceae, and is endemic to the Top End of the Northern Territory, Australia. It is an erect, multi-stemmed shrub or tree with fibrous bark and light brown branchlets, flat, half moon-shaped, straight or slightly curved phyllodes, spikes of golden yellow flowers, and narrowly oblong, thickly leathery pods.

== Description ==
Acacia mountfordiae is an erect, multistemmed shrub or tree that typically grows to a height of 4 m (13 ft), and is covered in a powdery white coating. The bark is dark grey and fibrous, and the branchets are light brown, glabrous and terete except near the outer ends. The phyllodes are half moon-shaped, flat, straight or slightly curved, 25–55 mm (0.98–2.17 in) long an 10–22 mm (0.39–0.87 in) wide, leathery and glabrous with two to five more or less indistinct main veins and a gland up to 1 mm (0.039 in) above the pulvinus. The flowers are golden yellow and borne in spikes 17–45 mm (0.67–1.77 in) long, 5–7 mm (0.20–0.28 in) wide on a peduncle 7–23 mm (0.28–0.91 in) long. Flowering occurs from June to October, and the pods are brown, linear to narrowly oblong, thickly leathery, straight to slightly curved, 20–52 mm (0.79–2.05 in) long and 5–9 mm (0.20–0.35 in) wide. The seeds are black, about 3 mm (0.12 in) long with a pale aril on the end.

== Taxonomy ==
Acacia mountfordiae was first formally described in 1958 by Raymond Specht in Records of the American-Australian Scientific Expedition to Arnhem Land No. 3 Botany and Plant Ecology from specimens collected near Oenpelli.

== Distribution and habitat ==
This species of wattle is endemic to the a small area of the Northern Territory where it has a limited distribution around Gunbalanya (formerly Oenpelli Mission) where it is commonly situated on top of or at the base of sandstone escarpments growing in skeletal sandy soils.

== Use in horticulture ==
The plant is sold commercially and is noted for its handsome weeping grey-green foliage contrasting with the bright golden flowers. It is drought tolerant, bird attracting and useful as a screening or filler plant.

== See also ==
- List of Acacia species
