= Sydney Technical High School =

- Sydney Technical High School Auditorium

Location
- Bexley, southern Sydney, New South Wales; Australia; 33°57′46″S 151°6′52″E

Information
- Type: Government-funded single-sex academically selective secondary day school
- Motto: Manners Makyth Man (William of Wykeham)
- Established: 1909; 117 years ago (as Sydney Technical College Day School); 1911; 115 years ago (as Sydney Technical High School)
- Founder: John Turner
- Sister school: St George Girls High School
- Educational authority: New South Wales Department of Education
- Principal: Steven So
- Staff: 27 (administrative)
- Teaching staff: 60
- Years: 7–12
- Gender: Boys
- Enrolment: c. 917 (2018)
- Campus: Forest Road, Bexley (since 1956); Albion Street, Paddington (1925–1955); Technical College, Ultimo (1911–1924)
- Campus type: Urban
- Colours: Burgundy and sky blue
- Nickname: Sydney Tech; STHS; Tech
- Publication: Tech Talk
- Website: sydneytech-h.schools.nsw.gov.au

Sydney Technical High School is a state-financed single-sex academically selective secondary day school for boys, located in Bexley, a southern suburb of Sydney situated near the city. Founded in 1911 as part of Sydney Technical College, the school was one of the six original New South Wales selective schools and caters for boys from Year 7 to Year 12. The school is colloquially abbreviated to Sydney Tech, STHS or simply Tech.

Admission to Year 7 is based on an external selective test held in Year 6 during March. Admissions for new students to Years 8, 9, 10 and 11 are restricted to filling any vacant places created by the loss of current students.

== Academic achievement ==
The school consistently achieves superior results in external assessments, such as the NAPLAN, the ICAS, the Record of School Achievement, and in particular, the Year 12 Higher School Certificate, where its students are regularly ranked in the top ten places in the state across a variety of subjects. On average, over 80% of its students achieve in the top 20% of the state, with a majority gaining an Australian Tertiary Admission Rank of more than 90.

Sydney Technical High School consistently ranks amongst the podium in the state for Engineering Studies in the Year 12 Higher School Certificate, frequently coming first with an average HSC mark nearing 90. Dr. Paul L. Copeland the writer of the Preliminary and HSC syllabus and exams is a teacher at the school. He also authored the two main textbooks for Engineering Studies; Engineering Studies: The Definitive Guide Volume 1 and Engineering Studies: The Definitive Guide Volume 2.

Sydney Technical High School also ranks consistently high, in the top twenty schools of the state for both English Advanced and English Standard courses in the Year 12 Higher Secondary Certificate. The school ranked first in the state for English Standard in 2022 with an average HSC mark of 80.5 for the cohort of that year.

In 2010, fifteen students from the school's graduating class received Premier's Awards for All-round Excellence in the NSW HSC. The school won the national championship in the University of Newcastle Science and Engineering Challenge in 2010 (gold division) and 2011 (silver division).

== History ==
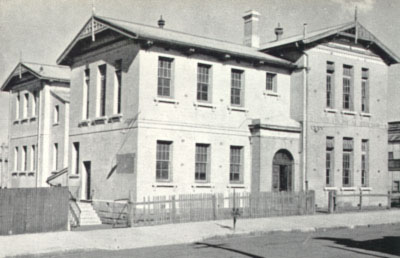
Sydney Technical High School building, 1925

One of the reforms advocated by the 1903 Royal Commission into NSW Education was the establishment of classes providing courses which would involve technical subjects. Consequently, Continuation classes for students interested in technical subjects commenced at the Sydney Technical College.

In April 1911, these Continuation classes were given the status of a high school, and Sydney Technical High was established. Originally, the school was co-educational with 113 boys and 15 girls. In February 1913, the girls were transferred to Fort Street Girls' High; and, from then on, the school became for boys only.

Since 1911, the school has been located at three Sydney sites:

- Ultimo House on Mary Ann Street: this was the "country" home of John Harris, Surgeon of the New South Wales Corps. The property was bought by the Government in 1899 and used by Technical Education for many years before being used by Sydney Tech High from 1911 to 1924.
- Paddington on Albion Street: in 1925, with an enrolment of 421, Sydney Tech High was transferred to Albion Street, Paddington. Although it was a note of expansion, it was a vigorous P&C campaign that encouraged the State Government to fund an entirely new site for the school.
- Bexley on Forest Road: the Old McConnachie's Paddock was occupied and first stone for the school's foundations was laid in March 1955, with the school completed and occupied by September 1956. The official opening for the school's new facilities was on 2 August 1958, with four units: the administration block, general classrooms ('A block'), manual training block and the auditorium and gymnasium. Throughout the years numerous additions have been made to the site. The School Pool was opened in 1966, the Kingston-David Library and Laboratories in 1975 and a brand-new administration block in 1998.

== Facilities ==
The current grounds at Bexley include the following physical facilities:

- The Cage Courts – basketball courts for Years 7–9 and 10–12, respectively
- Elmo Landsberger Cricket Nets – located between Lower courts and Back oval, 3 cricket batting nets & a plaque dedicated to Elmo Landsberger
- Anderson Street Courts – A new basketball court as well as 3 small handball courts and a volleyball court has been put in, near the Anderson Street car park. The construction was completed in May 2009.
- Sir Charles Kingsford Smith Memorial Library- large library with two floors
- The 1000 Auditorium for School Assemblies and performances
- J. Diaz Gymnasium with indoor basketball courts
- Matthew Goodall Memorial Garden – Adjacent the library
- Vera's Gym – A physical gymnasium dedicated for outside classroom learning and relaxation. It is often used by PASS and SLR students as well as seniors.
- The Passive Area – 3 table tennis tables and various benches outside the library. Completed recently in early 2018

== Extra-curricular activities ==
Extracurricular activities offered to Sydney Technical High School students include:

- P&C Association and Student Fundraising
- Debating Teams
- Student Representative Council (SRC)
- Interact – A group dedicated to charity fundraising
- Sound and Lighting Crew – A group of students who, under teacher supervision, dedicate their time to the continued maintenance and functioning of the auditorium and drama studio systems.
- FRED – The former, award-winning school newspaper run solely by students at the school. FRED returned temporarily after remaining dormant from 2005 to 2007. There was a temporary revival with the release of editions between 2008 and 2009; and once again in 2013 and 2014. FRED is no longer the school newspaper and has been, for all intents and purposes, replaced by the Tech High Times. However, there are talks of a relaunch for year 11&12 students as a senior alternative to the junior paper.
- Tech High Times – A journalism society for students in years 7–10 that intends to produce tabloid editions each term.
- Digital Media Team – A film-making, photography group founded in 2018, tasked with creating various multimedia presentations for school events. "A day at Tech." is regarded as their debut video, showing future Techies what school will be like.
- Public speaking – including Inter-School and grade-wide competitions
- Links Program – A group of year 9 students work with students from Hurstville Primary School, to show them what happens in high school and create links between the two schools. It is run by the history, science, creative arts/LOTE faculties.
- ISCF – Inter-School Christian Fellowship run by the students under teacher supervision
- Chess – Inter-School Chess Competition also in session.
- Committees of Year 12 organisation – for collaborating the Year 12 Yearbook, Formal, Year 12 End of Year Video and Jerseys
- School Bands – Beginner, Intermediate, Concert, Stage, String Ensemble, Choir
- Environment Team
- Centenary School Scholarships – Senior, Intermediate and Junior categories
- Department of Education's Great Schools Showoff short film competition – 2012 Sydney Regional winners and 2nd at State Finals

The SRC also organise various activities throughout the year, including:

- Pizza Day
- Talent Quest
- Family Feud
- Years 7–10 Scavenger Hunt

=== Sport ===
Tech is one of the 19 schools of the St. George Secondary Schools Sport Association, participating in inter-school competitions for sports including:

==== Summer ====
- Cricket
- Basketball
- Table tennis
- Touch football
- Beach volleyball
- Mini soccer

==== Winter ====
- Oztag
- Volleyball
- Field hockey
- Soccer
- Tennis
- Table tennis

==== Non-Grade ====
- Water polo
- Fencing
- Fitness
- Indoor sports
- Recreational tennis
- Tenpin
- Carlton Gym
- Ice skating
- Rock climbing

== Student life ==
=== Annual activities ===
The school's annual activities include:

- The "Celebrity" Human Movement Challenge
- Combined SRC Dance between Sydney Tech and St George Girls High School
- Musicale (School bands, music student groups and soloists)
- Senior Trivia Night (Prefecture)
- Jorge Diaz Wombi Ball Cup (Prefecture)
- SRC Week – Various activities such as Pizza Day, Talent Quest, Family Feud and Counter-Strike Competition
- Year 10 Formal (Formal Committee)
- Year 11 Social (Formal Committee)
- Year 12 Formal (Formal Committee)
- Annual Talent Quest
- 40 Hour Famine
- World's Greatest Shave
- TechFest - Short film competition - Senior and Junior divisions
- Tech Cup
- Year 12 House Soccer Cup

=== Prefects ===
As of 2008, the Prefect Body has been merged with the year 11 and 12 SRC members. The current system encompasses School Captain, Vice Captain, four Senior Prefects, an additional six Prefects from year twelve and another ten Prefects from year eleven. Senior Prefect roles and Captain roles are only available to holders of the school's Wykeham Award. The Vice-Captain chairs whole school assemblies. The Prefects of years 11 and 12 are responsible for canteen duties.

The SRC votes internally to determine the positions of the SRC president, the SRC vice-president and the SRC treasurer. The stated role of the SRC is to organize and raise funds for equipment and facilities for the school.

== Notable achievements ==
=== Australian Nuclear Science Competition ===
Sydney Technical High School won a competition that tested skills in a science and engineering challenge. Students competed in the regional competition at the Australian Nuclear Science and Technology Organisation (ANSTO) recently.

The event encouraged teenagers to get involved in maths and science and promote careers in the fields. Part of the challenge involved constructing a bionic hand. More than 250-year 9 and year 10 students from seven Sydney schools participated.

=== Canberra Maths Day ===
173 Year 12 students from 31 schools attended the 2014 Maths Day national finals. In teams of four the students took part in mathematical challenges designed to build teamwork skills and promote a love of maths. The day was divided into four challenges: a group of story problems, a Swiss 'find the rule' problem, a cross number puzzle and the day's highlight, the relay – a test of brainpower and physical stamina. 2nd prize was awarded to Sydney Technical High School and the competition is run annually by the Australian National University.

=== Metropolitan Secondary Schools Chess Competition ===
In 2014, the senior division of the Metropolitan Secondary Schools Competition was won by Sydney Technical High School.

== Associated schools ==
St George Girls High School is considered to be the female counterpart or 'sister school' of Sydney Technical High School, and often engages in Student Representative Council activities, as well as Combined Parents & Citizens meetings.

The school has a relationship with Nanzan High School in Japan, with a two-week exchange program in place.

== Notable alumni ==
Alumni are referred to as Old Boys. Alumni are part of the "STHS Old Boys Union".

Aviation

- Sir Charles Kingsford Smith – pioneering aviator, after whom Sydney's International Airport is named.

Entertainment and the arts

- Trevor Ashley – entertainer
- Carey Beebe – harpsichord maker and technician
- Warren Daly OAM – drummer, co-founder Daly-Wilson Big Band
- Alex Dimitriades – actor
- Stephen Edgar – poet
- Les Gock – musician
- Mark Isaacs – classical and jazz pianist, composer
- Clive James – author, critic, broadcaster, poet and translator
- Patrick Matthews – musician
- Leo McKern – actor
- Leonardo Nam – actor
- William Pidgeon – artist and Archibald Prize winner
- Imants Tillers – artist and Class of 1968
- Mike Tomalaris – journalist, TV presenter

Politics, religion and law

- Cecil Abbott AO, QPM – Commissioner of the New South Wales Police (1981–1984)
- Sir Robert Askin – Premier of New South Wales
- Francis Oag Hulme-Moir – 7th Bishop of Nelson
- Stephen Loosley – Former ALP Senator
- Sir John Leslie Carrick – Former NSW Liberal Senator
- Bruce Kenneth Childs – Former NSW Labor Senator
- Scott Farlow – Current Member of the Legislative Council in NSW
- Wes Davoren – Former Labor MP for New South Wales
- Bruce McDonald – former Leader of the Opposition of New South Wales (1981)
- Graham Richardson – former Senator (ALP) (1983–1994); Environment Minister (1987–1993); Health Minister (1992) during Bob Hawke's term of office as Prime Minister.
- Eugene Kamenka – political philosopher and Marxist scholar.

Sport

- Dick Crealy – Grand Slam-winning tennis player and Australia Davis Cup team member
- Reg Gasnier – Rugby league player
- John Konrads – Olympic gold-medallist swimmer and businessman

Others

- Saul Griffith – Australian-American inventor
- Max Howell – educator and rugby union player
- Victor Trikojus – professor of biochemistry
- Richard White – technology entrepreneur

== Notable teachers ==
- Rod Carter – former AFL player with Fitzroy and South Melbourne/Sydney
- Kelver Hartley – modern languages and classics teacher (1948–55)
- Patrick Matthews – musician

== See also ==
- List of government schools in New South Wales
- List of selective high schools in New South Wales
