= Elsie Bramell =

Australian anthropologist (1909–1985)

- Born: 14 August 1909; Port Moresby, Territory of Papua
- Died: 14 May 1985 (aged 75); St Leonards, New South Wales, Australia
- Other name: Elsie McCarthy
- Education: University of Sydney
- Spouse: Fred McCarthy
- Scientific career
- Workplaces: Australian Museum

Elsie Bramell (14 August 1909 – 14 May 1985) was an Australian anthropologist. She was the first person with a university degree and the first woman to be employed by the Australian Museum in its Anthropology Department. She and her husband, Fred McCarthy, were early advocates for the protection of Indigenous sites.

== Early life and education ==
Bramell was born on 14 August 1909 in Port Moresby, Territory of Papua. Her parents were Ada Blanch (née Skelly, later Bensted) who died in 1970 and Bertram William Bramell, a British public servant who became Commissioner of Native Affairs in New Guinea and later retired to Sydney where he died in 1938.

Bramell was sent to Mount St Mary's Dominican Convent in Moss Vale, for her primary education, before completing her secondary schooling at St George Girls' High School in Sydney, where she was school captain in 1927.

She next attended the University of Sydney where she was joint winner of the Frank Albert Prize in 1930 for her distinction in Anthropology I. She completed a BA in 1931 and a DipEd the following year. She subsequently graduated with a MA in 1935.

== Career ==
Bramell presented a paper on "Government and Justice in New Guinea" to the anthropology stream of the Science Congress held in Sydney in August 1932.

When she began work at the Australian Museum in February 1933 she was the first person with a university degree and first woman to be employed in a scientific role within its Anthropology Department. Her colleague, Fred McCarthy, was less qualified in anthropology, completing a diploma when she was working on her master's degree in 1935. Together they were responsible for the curation of exhibitions, cataloguing materials including stone tools. They also made field trips to conduct surveys of rock carvings.

Bramell married McCarthy on 28 March 1941 at St John's Church of England in Darlinghurst, at which time she was forced to resign from the Museum due to Public Service Board requirements at the time forbidding married women's employment in the Public Service.

In 1946 the Australian Museum published The Stone Implements of Australia, written by her husband Frederick "Assisted by Elsie Bramell, MA, DipEd and H. V. V. Noone".

She joined the Anthropological Society of New South Wales in 1935 and served on the Editorial Committee for its journal, Mankind, from 1940 to 1946.

== Death and legacy ==
Bramell died on 14 May 1985 in St Leonards, Sydney. She was survived by her husband and three children.

A laboratory, the Elsie Bramell Room, at the Northern Territory University in Darwin, was named in her honour.
