= Elizabeth Minchin =

Australian classicist

Elizabeth Hume Minchin OAM FAHA is an Australian classicist and former professor of classics at the Australian National University (ANU). Until 2014 she was one of the two editors of Antichthon, the journal of the Australasian Society for Classical Studies.

== Biography ==
Born in Sydney, eldest child of Armand and Danella Gunner, she attended St George Girls High School 1957–1961. After finishing her BA and Dip Ed at the University of Sydney, Minchin taught French, Latin, and Indonesian at Narrabundah College, Canberra from 1966 to 1972. She completed an MA (1983) and PhD (1989) in Classics at the ANU. Married since 1970, she has two sons.

Minchin's research focuses on the Homeric epics as oral poetry. Her main contribution is the application of cognitive psychology and sociolinguistics to the narratological studies of the Homeric epics. Her studies have encouraged classical scholars to recognise the continued relevance of linguistic studies for Homeric epic. She has published extensively.

Her book Homer and the Resources of Memory (OUP, 2001) draws on several forms of narratology and cognitive science, such as the script theory developed in the 1970s by Roger Schank and Robert Abelson. The book was recognised as 'a ground-breaking exploration of some of the ways the social sciences can help us better understand the mind of the poet who produced the Iliad and Odyssey.'

Her book Homeric Voices: Discourse, Memory, Gender (OUP, 2007) provides a compositional study of substantial speeches and exchanges of speech in Homeric songs. The book confirmed her as 'a pioneer in interdisciplinary research in the field.'

She was among the recipients of the 2007 Carrick Award for Australian University Teaching in the category "Citation for Outstanding Contributions to Student Learning".

In 2010 she was elected a Fellow of the Australian Academy of the Humanities and in 2014 she was elected Honorary Secretary of the Academy.

In 2013 she was appointed a Senior Fellow of the UK-based Higher Education Academy (HEA).

She has been a visiting scholar at Cambridge University (Clare Hall), Oxford University (Corpus Christi College), Brown University and Konstanz University. She was a member of the ARC-funded ANU-University of Melbourne 2010 Gallipoli Project.

From 2004 to 2014 she was a member of the Board of Fellows of University House, Australian National University as one of the Vice Chancellor's nominees. She was elected to the Board in 2015.

She has been active in the Friends of the ANU Classics Museum as President and in other executive positions. She has been active in The Australian Archaeological Institute at Athens as President of the Canberra (ANU) Friends and in other executive positions.

ANU appointed her an Emeritus Professor in 2015 and awarded her "2016 Alumnus of the Year – Research or Academia". At the December 2018 graduation ceremony she received the 2018 Chancellor's Award for Distinguished Contribution to ANU.

In 2015 she became a member of the board of directors of Luminescence Chamber Singers, a Canberra-based group of young choristers who perform as a virtuosic vocal octet.

Elizabeth Minchin and Heather Jackson co-edited 'Text and the Material World: Essays in Honour of Graeme Clarke' (Uppsala: Astrom Editions, 2017).

In the 2026 Australia Day Honours, Minchin was awarded the Medal of the Order of Australia for "service to tertiary education".

== See also ==
- Homeric scholarship
