= Rod Carter =

Australian rules footballer

Personal information
- Born: 29 October 1954 (age 72); Australia
- Original team: Banyule
- Debut: Round 11, 1974, Fitzroy vs. Geelong, at Kardinia Park
- Height: 191 cm (6 ft 3 in)
- Weight: 93 kg (205 lb)
- Position: Defender

Playing career^{1}
| Years | Club | Games (Goals) |
| 1974–1979 | Fitzroy | 76 (0) |
| 1980–1990 | South Melbourne/Sydney | 217 (1) |
| Total | | 293 (1) |
- ^{1} Playing statistics correct to the end of 1990.

Rod Carter (born 29 October 1954) is a former Australian rules footballer who played for Fitzroy and the Sydney Swans in the Victorian Football League (VFL). By the end of his career he was just seven games short of joining the 300 club.

== Football career ==
A defender, Carter was used mostly at full-back and kicked just the one goal in his 16 seasons of football. That goal came in a game against Melbourne at the SCG in 1986. After spending his first six years with the now defunct Fitzroy during the late 1970s, Carter left the club and joined Port Melbourne of the Victorian Football Association. He was picked up by South Melbourne (later Sydney) after half a season and went on to play his best football there in the 1980s.

== Personal life ==
He attended Macleod High School from 1967 to 1973. Since his retirement from playing Australian Rules Football he has been teaching at Sydney Technical High School as a PDHPE teacher.
