= Gwen Fleming =

Australian physician (1916–2011)

Gwen Fleming FRACP
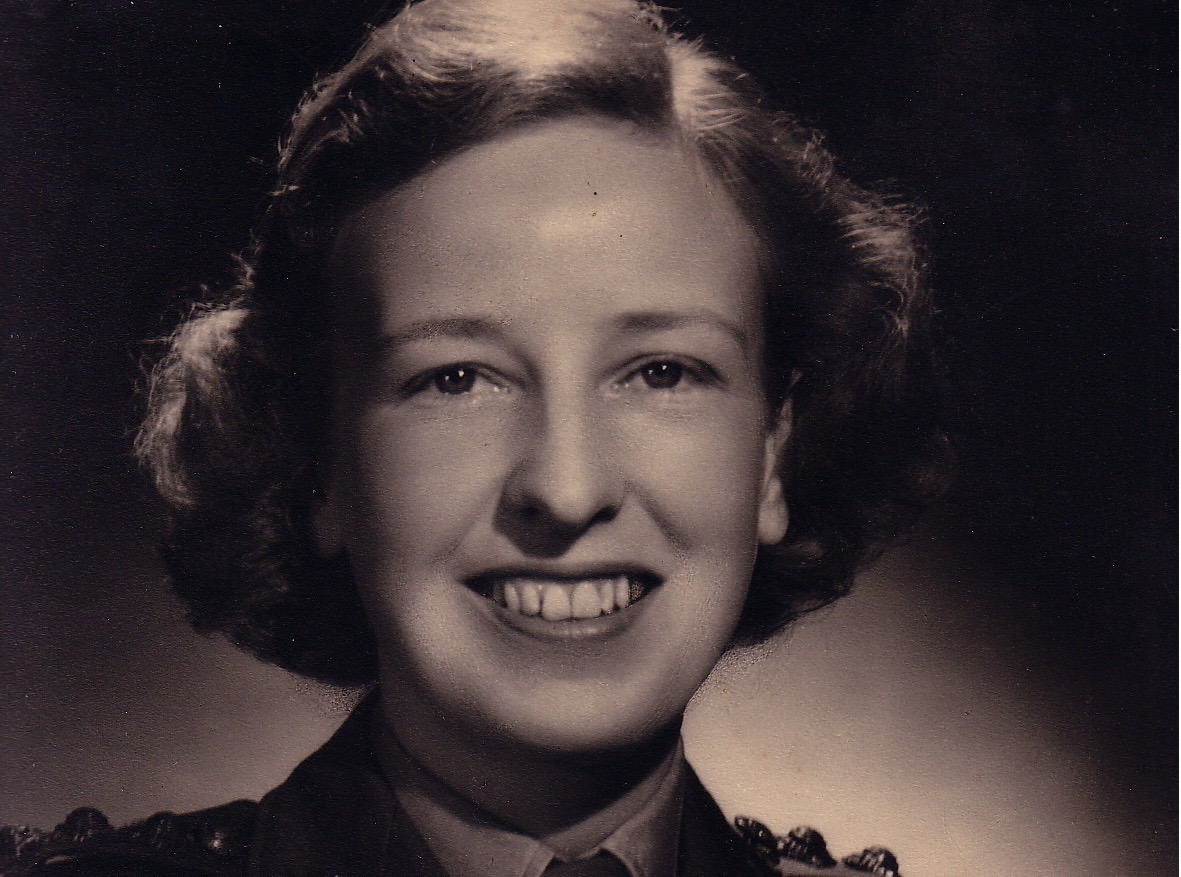
- Born: Mary Gwenyth Lusby; 9 June 1916; Taree, New South Wales, Australia
- Died: 18 January 2011 (aged 94)
- Education: University of Sydney (1939)
- Years active: 1939–1994
- Known for: First female major in the RAAMC; one of the first Australian woman thoracic physicians
- Medical career
- Profession: Medical doctor
- Field: Thoracic medicine
- Institutions: St Vincent's Hospital, Sydney
- Military career
- Allegiance: Australia
- Branch: Royal Australian Army Medical Corps
- Service years: 1939–1945
- Rank: Major
- Unit: Yaralla Military Hospital
- Commands: Officer Commanding the Medical Company

Mary Gwenyth "Gwen" Fleming (née Lusby) (9 June 1916 – 18 January 2011) was an Australian medical doctor who specialised in thoracic medicine and served in the Royal Australian Army Medical Corps during the Second World War.

== Early life and education ==
Mary Gwenyth Lusby was born in Taree in 1916, the third of six children of John and Caroline Lusby. Her maternal grandmother, Caroline Fitzhenry, had been a pioneer of health care in the Clarence River district of northern NSW, and founded the Bilongil Private Hospital at Casino, and the St Rock's Hospital at Ballina. Through the Fitzhenrys, Gwen was a cousin of the film star Errol Flynn.

Gwen's father John Lusby was a school principal and classics master in country NSW, and so the family moved around the state until his eventual teaching appointment in Sydney. He insisted on his daughters acquiring a high education. Gwen achieved her NSW Leaving Certificate at St George Girls High School, Kogarah in 1932 and her Baccalaureate in 1933.

She graduated as MBBS from the University of Sydney in 1939 and was among the first group of women medical graduates to pass through the University and Sancta Sophia College.

== Military service ==
After graduation, she was appointed as a resident medical officer at the Mater Misericordiae Hospital, Newcastle, until she enlisted for war service.

Gwen joined the Royal Australian Army Medical Corps (RAAMC) and, along with Captain Helen Braye, was appointed to the staff of the 113th Australian General Hospital at Concord in Feb 1942, where Captains Margery Scott-Young and Eileen Scott-Young were already serving as the only female doctors. In May 1942, The Daily Telegraph reported that "for the first time in the history of Australia, women doctors have been enlisted in the AIF", and that Gwen was one of six serving at Concord.

Initially a Captain, Gwen was later promoted to the rank of Major. Although she specialised in thoracic medicine, she oversaw all medical procedures at the hospital as Officer Commanding the Medical Company. As one of the first female majors in the RAAMC, she said that her colleagues "called me 'sir' during the war". Concord Hospital treated Allied servicemen and women as well as enemy prisoners of war. Gwen insisted on equal care being given to Japanese POWs, even as her own brother Robert Lusby of the 2/30th Battalion was suffering as a prisoner of the Japanese. At war's end, liberated Australian POWs began returning through Gwen's wards. Her search for brother Robert among the returnees ended with a telegram announcing his death in a Japanese camp two years before.

Gwen’s other siblings were heavily involved in the War. Elder brother Jack Lusby, a well known cartoonist and short story writer, fought with the RAAF in the Mediterranean Theatre; and brother Maurice Lusby, was sent to Washington and London as Australian Scientific Research Liaison Officer (a radio physicist, he worked with Robert J. Oppenheimer, the atomic bomb scientist). Sister Judith (Lusby) Follett worked with the WRANS in naval intelligence. Youngest sister Elizabeth missed war service, but entered the Dominican Sisters at the end of the War, later becoming a teacher and prioress.

In 1945, at the conclusion of the war, Gwen became one of the first women granted membership of the Royal Australasian College of Physicians (RACP).

== Later career ==
During the War, Gwen met Justin Fleming, a surgeon with the Royal Australian Air Force. The couple were married in 1946, and, after demobilisation, relocated to Oxford, in the United Kingdom, where Justin had been awarded a Nuffield Fellowship. While her husband studied for his Fellowship of the Royal College of Surgeons, Gwen became the breadwinner, working as a thoracic physician at Brentwood Hospital in Essex.

The Flemings returned to Australia in 1950 and settled in Wollstonecraft, a suburb of Sydney. Gwen's career was largely interrupted by caring for their six children - Margaret, Paul, Justin, Judith, James and Peter - but in 1973 she nonetheless appointed Fellow of the Royal Australasian College of Physicians. Her husband established a career as a pioneer vascular surgeon and founded the Australian Association of Surgeons, but his shock death of a heart attack in 1974 brought Gwen back into medical practice. She took up a post at a cancer clinic on Macquarie Street while also teaching at St Vincent's Hospital.

She retired at 77 years old and died in 2011. After Fleming's death, Marie Bashir, then Governor of New South Wales, described her as "an outstanding Australian woman who was an inspiration to so many who had the privilege of meeting her – both within the medical profession and beyond".
