= 1948 American-Australian Scientific Expedition to Arnhem Land =

1948 scientific research expedition to Arnhem Land in northern Australia

The American-Australian Scientific Expedition to Arnhem Land (also known as the Arnhem Land Expedition) remains one of the most significant, most ambitious and least understood expeditions. Commenced in February 1948, it was one of the largest scientific expeditions to have taken place in Australia and was conducted by a team of Australian and American researchers and support staff.

== Background ==
A number of publications, including H. H. Finlayson’s The Red Centre: Man and Beast in the Heart of Australia (1935), and Walkabout travel and geographical magazine (1934–1974), revised Australians' concept of 'The Centre" from the picture presented in J. W. Gregory's The Dead Heart of Australia (1909).

Leader-to-be of the Arnhem Land Expedition, Charles P. Mountford and his wife Bessie travelled over four months from Ernabella to Uluru in 1940, with Lauri Sheard and skilled cameleer Tommy Dodd undertaking an extensive study of the art and mythology surrounding Uluru and Kata Tjuta. The results of this endeavour were showcased through photographic exhibitions and a prize-winning film created in 1940, which subsequently became the foundation for Mountford's first publication Brown Men and Red Sand (1948), and his 1945 lecture tour in the United States which paved the way for the establishment of the American-Australian Scientific Expedition to Arnhem Land.

The American-Australian Scientific Expedition to Arnhem Land, known as the 'last of the big expeditions,' was not primarily about terrestrial exploration but aimed to advance knowledge. It focused on studying the natural environment and Aboriginal inhabitants. Taking place after World War II, it symbolized transformations in Australia and globally. The expedition served diplomatic objectives by showcasing collaboration between the United States and Australia, enhancing their trans-Pacific relationship. The mission's public face hid negotiations that would shape this relationship for the 20th century. The expedition garnered domestic support due to Australia's pro-American sentiments after WWII, as the nation adjusted to post-war changes and Britain's reduced global influence. The subsequent signing of the ANZUS Treaty by Robert Menzies continued this collaborative trajectory.

== The expedition ==
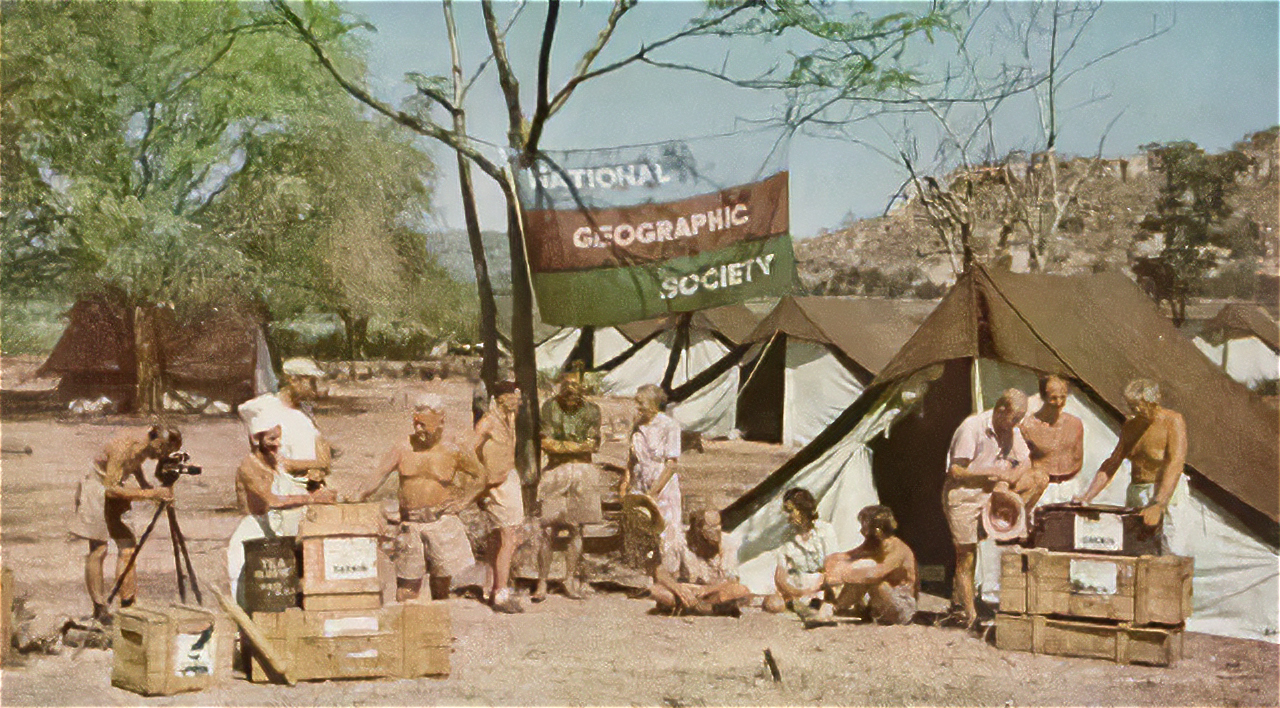
Arnhem Expedition members

Seventeen individuals, both men and women, journeyed across the remote region known as Arnhem Land in northern Australia for nine months. From varying disciplinary perspectives, and under the guidance of expedition leader Charles Mountford, they investigated the Indigenous populations and the environment of Arnhem Land. In addition to an ethnographer, archaeologist, photographer, and filmmaker, the expedition included a botanist, a mammalogist, an ichthyologist, an ornithologist, and a team of medical and nutritional scientists.

Their first base camp was Groote Eylandt in the Gulf of Carpentaria. Three months later they moved to Yirrkala on the Gove Peninsula and three months following that to Oenpelli (now Gunbalanya) in west Arnhem Land. The journey involved the collaboration of different sponsors and partners (among them the National Geographic Society, the Smithsonian Institution, and various agencies of the Commonwealth of Australia).

A Bulletin article in 1956 noted that the scientists collected 13,500 plants, 30,000 fish, 850 birds, 460 animals, thousands of implements, amounting to twenty-five tons, and photographed and filmed in colour and black-and-white and made tracings of cave-paintings from Chasm Island, Groote Eylandt and Oenpelli. The Australian Broadcasting Commission promoted the Expedition in its ABC Weekly magazine by appealing to readers curiosity about "...a fish that looks exactly like a leaf, a multi-coloured praying mantis, intricate string games the aborigines play, a fungus used to cure wounds..."

In the wake of the expedition came volumes of scientific publications. The legacy of the 1948 Arnhem Land Expedition is vast, complex, and, at times, contentious. Human remains collected by Setzler and later held by the Smithsonian Institution have since been repatriated to Gunbalanya.

== Expedition members ==
First name	Last name	Role	Organisation
Charles Pearcy	Mountford	Expedition Leader, ethnographer and film-maker	Honorary Associate Curator in Ethnology, South Australian Museum, Adelaide
Frank M.	de: Setzler	Deputy Leader and Archaeologist	Head Curator, Department of Anthropology, National Museum of Natural History, Smithsonian Institution, Washington
Herbert G	Deignan	Ornithologist	Associate Curator of Birds, Smithsonian Institution, Washington
David H.	Johnson	Mammalogist	Curator of Mammals, Smithsonian Institution, Washington
Robert R.	Miller	Ichthyologist	Associate Curator of Fishes, Smithsonian Institution, Washington
Raymond L.	Specht	Botanist	Lecturer, Department of Botany, University of Adelaide
Frederick D	McCarthy	Anthropologist	Department of Anthropology, Australian Museum, Sydney
Harrison Howell	Walker	Photographer, Writer	National Geographic Society, Washington
Bessie I.	Mountford	Honorary Secretary, wife of leader	
Brian	Billington	Medical Officer	Institute of Anatomy, Canberra
Margaret	McArthur	Nutritionist	Institute of Anatomy, Canberra
Kelvin	Hodges	Biochemist	Institute of Anatomy, Canberra
William E	Harney	Guide and Liaison Officer	
Peter	Bassett-Smith	Cine-Photographer	
Keith	Cordon	Transport Officer	
John E.	Bray	Cook and Honorary Entomologist	
Reginald	Hollow	Cook (2 months)	

=== ABC reporters ===
Two staff members from ABC Radio also joined the expedition:

- Colin Simpson
- Raymond Frank Giles - Sound Recorder

== Publications ==
- Mountford, Charles P.; American-Australian Scientific Expedition to Arnhem Land (1956). Records of the American-Australian scientific expedition to Arnhem Land (1st ed.). Victoria: Melbourne University Press. OCLC 604762407.
- Mountford, Charles P.; Specht, Raymond L. (1960). Records of the American-Australian Scientific Expedition to Arnhem Land. 2. Anthropology and Nutrition. Vol. 2 (1st ed.). Melbourne: Melbourne University Press.
- Mountford, Charles P.; Specht, Raymond L. (1958). Records of the American-Australian Scientific Expedition to Arnhem Land. 3, Botany And Plant Ecology (1st ed.). Carlton, Vic.: Melbourne University Press. OCLC 223700975.
- Mountford, Charles P.; Specht, Raymond L. (1964). Records of the American-Australian scientific expedition to Arnhem Land. 4, Zoology (1st ed.). Parkville, Vic: Melbourne University Press. OCLC 223700983.

== Collections ==
- National Museum of Australia
- Australian Museum
- National Museum of Natural History, Smithsonian Institution
- Art Gallery of New South Wales
- South Australian Museum
- State Herbarium of South Australia
- Art Gallery of South Australia
- State Library of South Australia (literary collections)
- Tasmanian Museum and Art Gallery
- Art Gallery of Western Australia
- Queensland Art Gallery
- National Gallery of Victoria
