= Inter-School Christian Fellowship =

Inter-School Christian Fellowship (ISCF) or Inter-Scholastic Christian Fellowship is a Christian youth ministry that works with students within high schools. ISCF groups are often supported by external evangelical Christian organisations and churches – examples including the International Fellowship of Evangelical Students, the Scripture Union, and local churches. ISCF operates in countries including Australia, Canada, Indonesia, Philippines and the United States of America.

ISCF groups are often voluntarily led by senior students and usually have the support and guidance of an older mentor, youth pastor, or a patron teacher. ISCF groups mainly meet during lunchtime.

== Australia ==
=== Activities ===
Some typical activities of an ISCF program include:

- Talks by students and guest-speakers (e.g. Pastors)
- Bible studies
- Singing
- Games
- Barbecues
- Camps
- Combined gatherings and socials with ISCF groups from other schools

In supporting students wishing to be better equipped for serving in ISCF, there are various training programmes available, for instance the annual "ISCF Leadership Conference" (Scripture Union NSW), or "Rising Leaders" (part of the Next Generation conference, hosted by the Katoomba Christian Convention Center).

=== Schools in Australia ===
Through the post-war (WWII) period ISCF operated in several government high schools, including Balwyn High School in Victoria, where it was particularly active through the 1960s. The numbers of government schools with an ISCF declined with a general decrease in religious activities in government schools. Some Australian high schools with ISCF groups include:

- Armidale High School
- Baulkham Hills High School
- Brisbane Boys' College
- Brisbane Grammar School
- Caringbah High School
- Carlingford High School
- Cheltenham Girls High School
- Cherrybrook Technology High School
- Chatswood High School
- Engadine High School
- Epping Boys' High School
- Figtree High School
- Hornsby Girls High School
- Heathcote High School
- James Ruse Agricultural High School
- Kingsgrove High School
- North Sydney Boys High School
- North Sydney Girls High School
- Moreton Bay College
- Normanhurst Boys High School
- Muirfield High School
- Ravenswood School for Girls
- Sefton High School
- Somerville House
- St George Girls High School
- St Margaret's Anglican Girls School
- St Aidan's Anglican Girls' School
- Sydney Boys High School
- Sydney Girls High School
- Sydney Technical College
- Sydney Technical High School

== See also ==
- International Sport Combat Federation of Mixed Martial Arts
