= Justin Fleming (author) =

Australian playwright, screenwriter and author (born 1953)

- Born: 3 January 1953 (age 73); Sydney, New South Wales, Australia
- Education: Saint Ignatius' College, Riverview; University of Sydney; University College London; Honorable Society of King's Inns
- Occupations: Author, playwright, librettist and screenwriter

Justin Fleming (born 3 January 1953) is an Australian playwright, librettist and author. He has written for theatre, music theatre, opera, television and film, and his works have been produced and published in Australia, the US, Canada, the UK, Belgium, Poland and France. Fleming has been a barrister and vice president of the Australian Writers' Guild, and a board member of the Australian National Playwrights' Centre. He is a member of the Honorable Society of King's Inns, Dublin.

== Early life, education and career ==
Born in Sydney in 1953, Fleming is one of the six children of Justin Fleming and Gwen Fleming. His father, Justin Fleming Snr, was a pioneering vascular surgeon who served with the RAAF during the Second World War. His mother, Gwen Fleming (née Lusby), also a doctor, served as one of the first women majors in the Australian Army Medical Corps during the war. The couple met while serving at Concord Military Hospital and married soon after the war.

Fleming attended Saint Ignatius' College, Riverview, a Jesuit school in Sydney. There he was taught English literature by Joseph Castley and Charles MacDonald, S.J., and the classics by Charles Fraser, S.J. Near contemporaries at the college included the writers Gerard Windsor, Nick Enright and Brian A. Williams, and the composer Stewart D'Arrietta. He was taught music by Lorraine Henderson, Julienne Horn and Tessa Birnie. After leaving school, Fleming enrolled in Arts at the University of New South Wales and attended part-time acting classes with Hayes Gordon and Zika Nester at the Ensemble Theatre in Sydney. In 1972 he joined Gemini Productions, working in television and contributing scripts for The Godfathers, The True Blue Show (ATN 7), The Spoiler and The Young Doctors.

In 1973, Fleming began part-time law studies at the University of Sydney, where he became director of the Gilbert and Sullivan Society, with productions including The Pirates of Penzance, HMS Pinafore and The Gondoliers. He was associate to District Court Judge John Lincoln from 1974 until 1978, and completed his first law degree in 1978. He subsequently gained a Master of Laws with Merit from University College London, and for some years practised as a barrister in Dublin and Sydney before writing full-time. Fleming wrote his first plays in the late 1970s while still working in the law, completing the manuscript for Hammer in 1978 and Doubted his Empire in 1979.

Fleming is married to the author and academic Fae Brauer.

== Career as playwright ==
Fleming's first play, Hammer, was staged at the Festival of Sydney in 1981 and was followed by Indian Summer in 1982. In 1983, at the Sydney Opera House, Robert Helpmann starred for the Sydney Theatre Company in the world premiere of Fleming's play The Cobra. Helpmann portrayed the elderly Lord Alfred Douglas, reflecting bitterly on his youthful relationship with Oscar Wilde.

In 1989, the Sydney Theatre Company produced Harold in Italy at the Sydney Opera House; it was later staged by the Studio Theatre, Łódź, Poland. The Deep Blue was staged at The Bush in London in 1991, and the following year the Ensemble Rep Studios produced The Nonsense Boy. Fleming has twice been awarded the Nancy Keesing Writer's Fellowship to the Cité internationale des arts in Paris (1993, 1998), where he wrote The Starry Messenger and Burnt Piano (in French, Le piano brûlé). The latter was staged around Australia, won the New York New Dramatists' Award in 2000 and opened in New York City in March 2001. It was shortlisted for various awards including the NSW Premier's Literary Awards and won the Banff PlayRites Residency, Canada. The playwright Harold Pinter was an admirer of Fleming's work, particularly the portrait of Samuel Beckett in Burnt Piano, and described Fleming as a writer "of authority and distinction".

Other plays include adaptations of Émile Zola's Au Bonheur des Dames (The Department Store) at the Old Fitzroy, and D. H. Lawrence's Kangaroo at the Illawarra Performing Arts Centre in August 2003.

Fleming has been librettist and lyricist on Crystal Balls (Compact Opera/UK tour/Sadler's Wells, London), The Ninth Wonder (Sydney Theatre Company), Tess of the d'Urbervilles (Savoy Theatre, London and UK tour), Accidental Miracles (WAAPA/Sydney Theatre Company/Cameron Mackintosh), Satango (Griffin Theatre Company/Riverside Theatres/Vegas Theater Company), Ripper (Ensemble Theatre), Laid in Earth (Queensland Music Festival), The Merry Widow for Opera Australia, West Australian Opera, Opera Queensland and State Opera of South Australia, and Whiteley for Opera Australia. Whiteley was nominated by the Writers' Guild for an AWGIE Award for Music Theatre in 2020 and for an International Opera Award for Best New Work in 2020. Fleming is creator and librettist on a new opera, Helpmann, about Robert Helpmann, and wrote a new English libretto for Die Fledermaus. He wrote the script and lyrics for Mata Hari with the composer Thos Hodgson.

In 2006, Fleming was made writer-in-residence by the Dr Robert and Lina Thyll-Dur Foundation at La Casa Zia Lina on Elba, Italy, where he translated Molière's Tartuffe (titled The Hypocrite) from the original French into English. In 2007 he was awarded the Writer's Residency at Arthur Boyd's Bundanon, where he wrote Origin, a play about Charles Darwin commissioned by the Melbourne Theatre Company. He was granted a residency at the Don Bank Museum, North Sydney, and awarded the Tasmanian Writers' Centre Residency in 2008, where he wrote His Mother's Voice. In 2011, Fleming was commissioned by the Bell Shakespeare Company to translate Molière's The School for Wives, and by Ensemble Studio Theatre and the Alfred P. Sloan Foundation, New York, to write Soldier of the Mind, a play about the Spanish neuroscientist Santiago Ramón y Cajal.

In 2015, Riverside Theatres produced Shellshock, and in 2016 Griffin Theatre Company and Bell Shakespeare Company co-produced The Literati, Fleming's adaptation of Molière's Les Femmes Savantes. In 2018, Dresden was staged at KXT in Sydney and The Misanthrope in Bell Shakespeare Company's co-production with Griffin Theatre Company; in 2019, Bell Shakespeare Company toured his translation of The Miser. The Scream was shortlisted for the Silver Gull Play Award in 2020. A new play, An Independent Woman, about Dame Doris Fitton, was shortlisted for the Seaborn Broughton & Walford Foundation Playwrights Award in 2021, selected for the Storytellers Festival in 2023 and for presentation in the restored Independent Theatre in North Sydney, 2026. Fleming was commissioned by Dr James Wall to write a new play, Visions, and is the author of Joan, on the legendary Australian Soprano, Dame Joan Sutherland, 2026.

== Other works ==
Fleming's screenplays include Burnt Piano and The Tree House. The Tree House was selected for UK Film Festival 2027. His works for television include Part One of the history of Australian cinema, The Celluloid Heroes, for ABC TV. Fleming's history of the common law, Barbarism to Verdict, was written for ABC/BBC television and published internationally by HarperCollins with a foreword by John Mortimer QC. Other publications include his histories The Crest of the Wave (Allen & Unwin), The Vision Splendid and All That Brothers Should Be (Beaver Press). His Paris journal was published by Halstead Press in Paris Studio. He is the author of Stagelines – Writing Scripts for the Theatre (Phoenix Education) and A Molière Anthology (Five Senses Education). The papers of Justin Fleming are held at the State Library of New South Wales.

== Published works ==
=== Non-fiction ===
- All That Brothers Should Be
- Paris Studio
- Barbarism to Verdict – A History of the Common Law, foreword by John Mortimer, QC ISBN 0-207-17929-8 (pbk.)
- The Vision Splendid – A History of Carroll & O'Dea
- The Crest of the Wave – A History of Waverley College 1903–2003
- The Wave Rolls On – Waverley College Old Boys' Union 1908–2008, format edited by Col Blake
- A Molière Anthology – Tartuffe, The School for Wives, The Miser, The Literati (Les Femmes Savantes). Phoenix Education; Currency Press.
- His Mother's Voice. Phoenix Education.
- Stagelines – Writing Scripts for the Theatre. Phoenix Education.

=== Opera and music theatre librettos and lyrics ===
- Crystal Balls
- The Ninth Wonder
- Tess of the d'Urbervilles
- The Merry Widow – Opera Australia
- Accidental Miracles
- Satango
- Ripper
- Laid in Earth (Queensland Music Festival, 2009 – music by Damian Barbeler)
- Whiteley (2019, music: Elena Kats-Chernin, on the life of Brett Whiteley)

=== Plays ===
- The Nonsense Boy
- Junction
- The Cobra
- Burnt Piano – published by Phoenix Education
- Hammer
- Kangaroo
- Coup d'état & Other Plays
- Indian Summer
- The Department Store
- Harold in Italy
- The Myth of the Passive Citizen
- The Starry Messenger
- Her Holiness – with Melvyn Morrow
- Tartuffe (The Hypocrite)
- The School for Wives
- His Mother's Voice

=== Screenplays ===
- Lord Devil
- The Shedding
- The Tree House
- Caroline
- Dead Men Running
- Nellie

== See also ==
- Gwen Fleming
- List of playwrights
- Theatre of Australia
