= Margery Scott-Young =

Australian surgeon (1912–1997)

Margery Scott-Young (25 May 1912 – 4 November 1997) was an Australian surgeon at Sydney's Rachel Forster Hospital. She served as a major in the Royal Australian Army Medical Corps during World War II.

== Biography ==
Margery Scott-Young was born in North Sydney on 25 May 1912. She attended Monte Sant'Angelo Mercy College and qualified as MBBS from the University of Sydney in 1936.

Scott-Young was appointed to Sydney Hospital as a resident in 1936, and a year later she was made medical superintendent of the Rachel Forster Hospital. She moved to the Royal Hospital for Women in 1939 and left in 1940 to join the Royal Australian Army Medical Corps, eventually rising to the rank of major. She served at the 113th Australian General Hospital at Concord along with fellow women military doctors Gwen Fleming, Helen Braye and Eileen Scott-Young.

After World War II, she returned to the Rachel Forster Hospital's surgical department, holding the position of honorary assistant surgeon (1946–58) and honorary consultant surgeon (1958–72). She retired from practice in 1972 but continued to be active in the New South Wales branch of the Australian Medical Association, the Australian Federation of Medical Women, the Medical Benevolent Association of NSW, and the Australian Postgraduate Federation of Medicine.

Scott-Young was elected a fellow of the Royal Australasian College of Surgeons and the Royal College of Surgeons of England in 1953. She was appointed Commander of the Order of the British Empire (CBE) in 1977. Her memoir, titled Family Bugles, was published in 1991, and she died in Lane Cove on 4 November 1997.
