= Susien Chong =

Australian fashion designer

Susien Chong is an Australian fashion designer and a co-founder of the Sydney-based fashion label Lover.

Chong grew up in Sydney, attending St George Girls' High School, Kogarah. She obtained a degree in design from the University of Technology Sydney and came to prominence by winning the Smirnoff Fashion Award while still a student.

She interned for Australian label Zimmermann before founding Lover in 2001. She presented her debut solo show in 2004 at the Australian Fashion Week.
