= Margaret McArthur =

Australian nutritional anthropologist

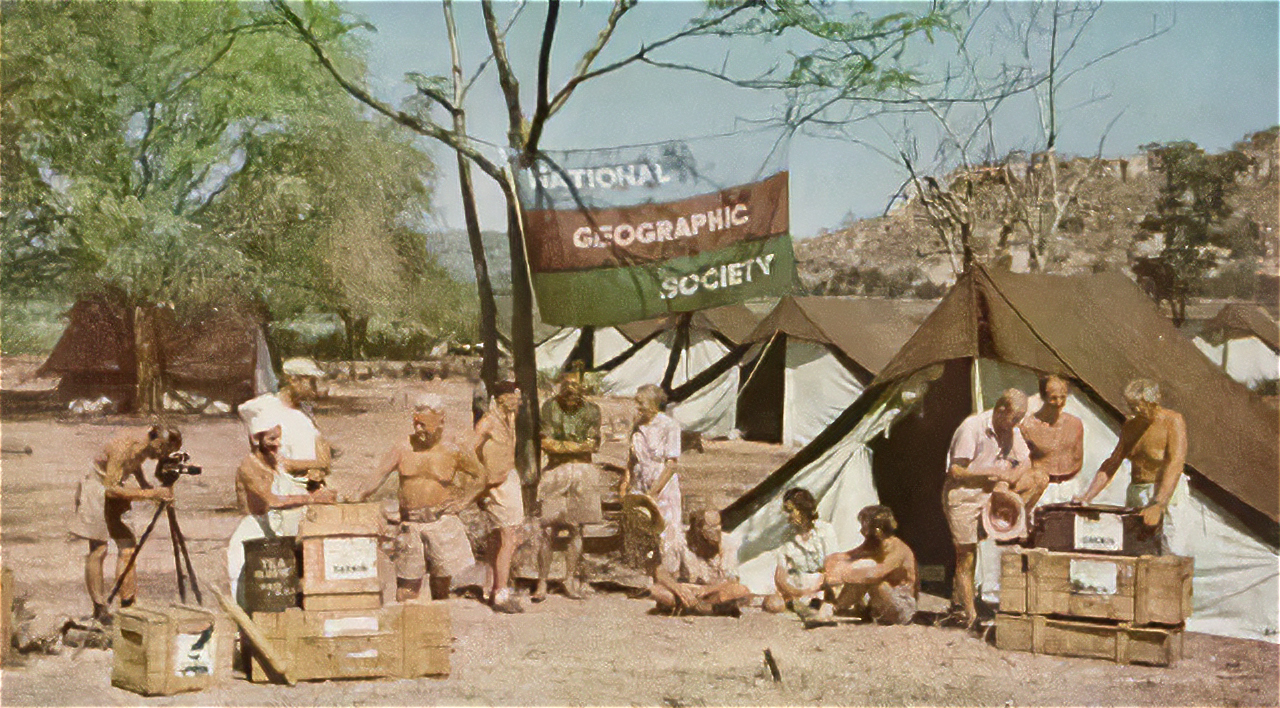
Margaret McArthur (5th from right) at the 1948 Arnhem Expedition

Annie Margaret McArthur (1919–2002) was an Australian nutritionist, anthropologist and educator. She is remembered for conducting ground-breaking research from the late 1940s into the Indigenous and First Nations peoples of Australia, Papua New Guinea and the Pacific region. After assignments with the World Health Organization and the Food and Agriculture Organization, in 1965 she was engaged as the first women lecturer in the Department of Anthropology at the University of Sydney, becoming a senior lecturer prior to her retirement in 1975.

== Early life and education ==
Born in Ararat in south-west Victoria on 6 December 1919, Annie Margaret McArthur studied biochemistry and bacteriology at the University of Melbourne leading to a B.Sc. (1941) and an M.Sc. (1942). She took a post-graduate course in nutrition at the Australian Institute of Anatomy (1946) and received a diploma in social anthropology from the University of London (1952). In 1962, she earned a Ph.D. in social anthropology from the Australian National University 1962 with a thesis titled The Kunimaipa: the Social Structure of a Papuan Society.

== Career ==
After receiving her master's degree, MacArthur spent three years during World War II as a researcher at the Commonwealth Scientific & Industrial Research Organisation in Canberra where she helped develop containers to deliver food for troops in the tropics (1943–1945). Following training at the Australian Institute of Anatomy, in 1947 she joined the Nutrition Expedition to New Guinea conducted by the Commonwealth Department of Health. In 1948, she served as a nutritionist in the American-Australian Scientific Expedition to Arnhem Land to study the ecology of indigenous nomads in the far north-east of Australia's Northern Territory.

In connection with her Ph.D., MacArthur undertook field research on the Kunimaipa people of Papua, communicating with them in their own language as she studied their nutritional habits. From 1958 to 1960, she worked as a social anthropology consultant to the government of Malaya on behalf of the World Health Organization. She then spent a year as nutrition consultant for Indonesia on an assignment from the United Nations Food and Agriculture Organization.

In 1965 she was engaged by the University of Sydney as the first women lecturer in its Department of Anthropology, becoming a senior lecturer prior to her retirement in 1975. In 1976, she married the retired Harvard anthropology professor Douglas Oliver and settled with him in Honolulu. She died there after a long illness on 12 May 2002.
