= David H. Johnson =

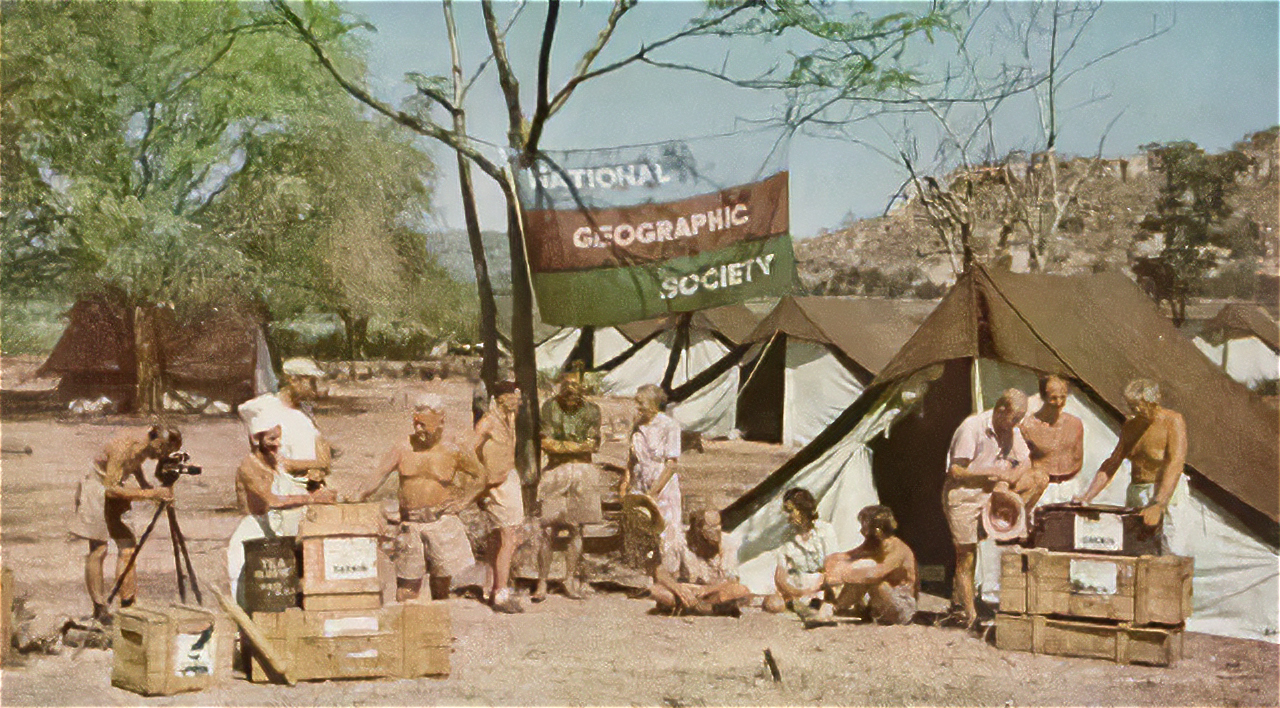
David H. Johnson (3rd from left) at the 1948 Arnhem Expedition

David Horn Johnson (1912–1996) was a zoologist and department head at the Smithsonian Institution's National Museum of Natural History, specialising in the study of mammals.

Johnson completed a Ph.D. at the University of California Berkeley and began working for the museum as curator in 1941. During World War II, he became interested in Asian mammals and went on to research and publish on the topic.

After becoming head of the mammal department of the museum, he participated in the 1948 American-Australian Scientific Expedition to Arnhem Land in the Northern Territory, Australia. Descriptions of parts of collection, several bats and a marsupial, were later published as new species. He is reported to have been an accomplished bushman, marksman and prepared his own specimens.
