= Studio Theatre, Łódź =

Theatre in Lodz, Poland

The Studio Theatre in Łódź
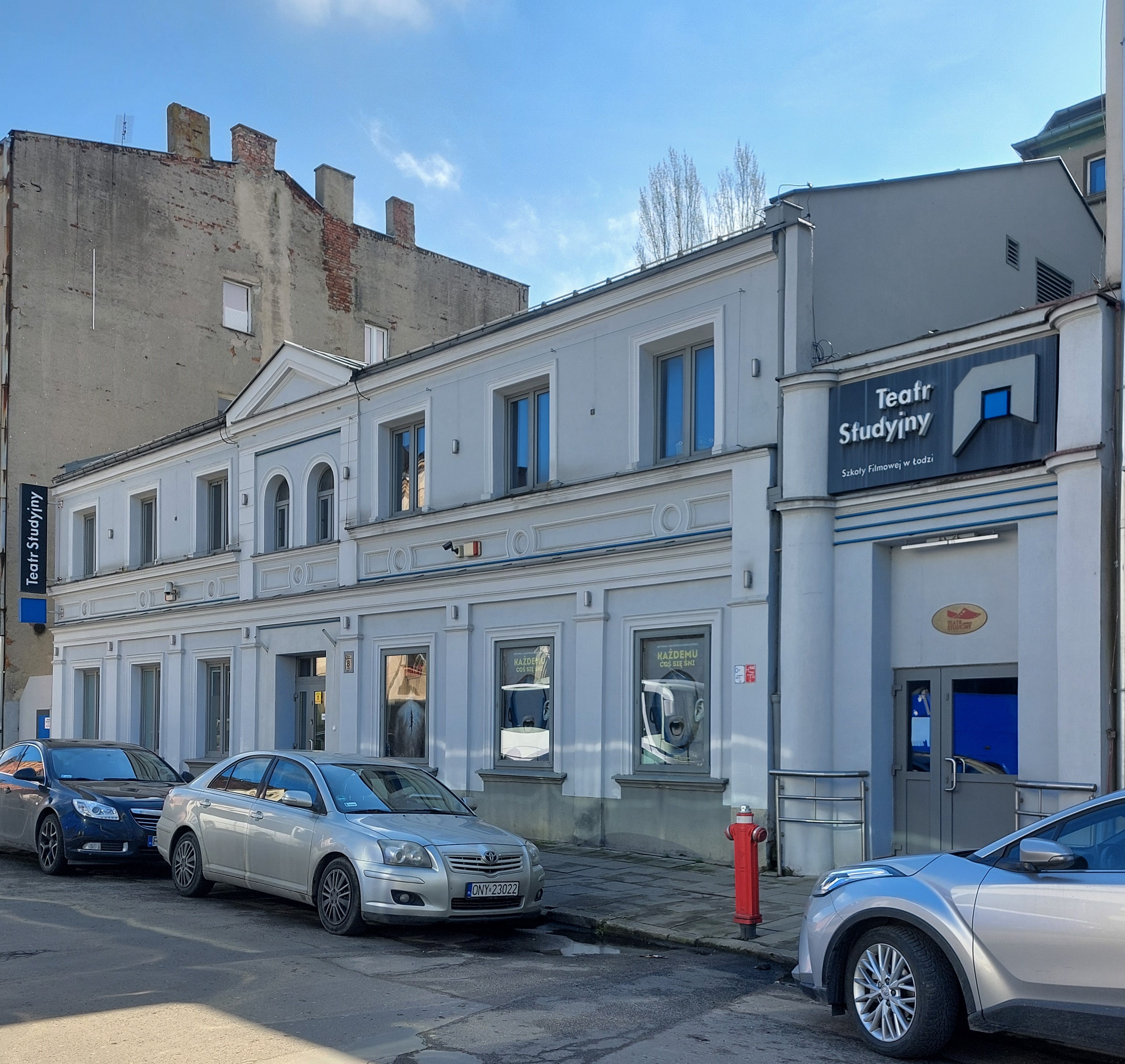
- The facade of the building at Kopernik Street, 2024
- Interactive map of The Studio Theatre in Łódź
- Address: Kopernik Street 8 Łódź; Poland
- Coordinates: 51.7633°N 19.452°E
- Owner: National Film School in Łódź
- Capacity: 60/120 (small scene/big scene)

Construction
- Opened: 1870
- Years active: 1870 - present

Website
- www.filmschool.lodz.pl

The Studio Theatre in Łódź (Polish: Teatr Studyjny przy PWSFTiT im. Schillera) is one of the oldest theatres in Łódź (Poland), having been built in 1870. Since 1998, it was managed by the Leon Schiller National Higher School of Film, Television and Theatre, and in 2002 the theatre became the school's property.

== History ==
The theatre was built in 1870 in Łódź in the times of Russia-dependent Kingdom of Poland. It was one of many cultural – utilitarian institutions set up in Łódź at that time because of the rapid development of the town and the growth of its significance as one of the major cultural and industrial centres of the Kingdom. From the beginning of its activity, through years leading to the outbreak of World War I the theatre was staging mainly Russian plays due to strong influence of the Russian Empire on the Polish culture. After the war when Poland regained independence the theatre was sidelined from the main course of Łódź cultural life due to poor management which resulted in considerable debt. The building itself was used as a storage by the owners of an adjacent store. During World War II the theatre edifice was destroyed sharing the fate of most of the Łódź's development. The early post-war years marked the repeated heyday of the theatre. In 1958 it was renamed the Theatre of Łódź's Soil (Teatr Ziemi Łódzkiej) and linked with the Leon Schiller National Higher School of Film, Television and Theatre established in 1948. From the beginning of its activity, the school educated the new generation of Polish artists called The Polish Film School. Among the alumni were such distinguished artists like Roman Polański, Andrzej Wajda, Krzysztof Kieslowski and many others. Most of them made their debuts on the stage of the theatre. In 1983 the theatre was renamed as Julian Tuwim's Studio Theatre (Teatr Studyjny im. Juliana Tuwima). In 2002, as the Studio Theatre, it officially became the property of the Leon Schiller National Film School.

== 2002-present ==
Since 2002 the 4th year students of the Acting Department prepare and present their graduation spectacles as well as engage in their independent artistic projects. Apart from being the place of teaching and presentation, the Studio Theatre is also a place in which various research and artistic projects are carried out for instance: The Festival of Theatrical Schools, Workshops of the European Theatrical Schools, Drama Workshops "Drama in Progress". The plays staged at Studio Theatre not only gained liking and recognition among the young audience but also managed to meet the expectations of the drama critics in Poland and in Europe.

In 2006 for the first time in history Studio Theatre was awarded The Golden Mask award by the Polish Critics Association for the best play for the spectacle of Sergi Belbel's Łoże directed by Karolina Szymczak.

The theatre has two scenes which can seat 120 and 60 audience members.

== Notable plays ==
=== Nikolai Gogol's Marriage ===
Dir. Georgy Lifanov

A comedy full of twists and surprising outcomes. Ivan Podkolyosin, an elderly bachelor occupying a prestigious clerical position, upon being strongly encouraged by his close friend, decides to get married. He adopts a peculiar approach to the subject and when he makes the decision to step into matrimony, in a final moment of prenuptial solitude he arrives at a conclusion that marriage is the most wonderful thing in the world and regrets the wasted time. Right afterwards, upon cooling down he commits an act which can be commented with a proverb: "Do as you’d be done by". "Marriage" is a play that remains popular. It shows the matrimonial stock exchange on which one can gain fortune but be disillusioned. It is full of contradictions, witty dialogue and well developed characters.

Translation: Julian Tuwim
Direction: Georgy Lifanov
Set design: Anna Tomczyńska
Cast:
Agafya: Joanna Osyda
Podkolyosin: Daniel Misiewicz
Kochkaryov: Piotr Witkowski
Fyokla: Julia Rybakowska
Arina: Aleksandra Derda
Dunyashka: Dorota Kuduk
Yaichnitsa: Przemysław Kurek
Zhevakin: Mateusz Olszewski
Anuchkin: Janusz Komorowski
Panteleiev: Konrad Michalak
Starikov: Łukasz Chmielowski

=== Urs Widmer's Top Dogs ===
Dir. Marcin Brzozowski

"Top Dogs – top price class" – people representing the management. They used to be the top players in the game but now they are obsolete. Once they have lost their jobs, their lives fell apart. Some of them still cannot come to terms with reality. They cannot believe that they ended up on the street after losing in the ruthless rat race. They meet in a peculiar place, something between employment agency and a therapy group. They are work-a-holics on rehab desperately trying to find a new meaning to their existence. Top Dogs is a psychodrama which holds the characters hostage, strips them of the lies and illusions which they are feeding each other. It brings out their secrets and deeply concealed thoughts which the characters were frantically trying to bury in their memories. However, the therapy is perverse. On one hand it teaches them how to survive in the new circumstances but on the other it maintains their love for money, power and career.

translation: Jerzy Koenig
direction & scene design: Marcin Brzozowski
costumes: Anna Kunka-Kawełczyk
Cast:
Mrs. Jenkins: Martyna Zaremba
Mrs. Wrage: Katarzyna Kowalczuk
Mrs. Bihler: Paula Bąk
Mrs. Schwander: Katarzyna Bagniewska
Mrs. Tschudi: Dorota Kuduk
Mrs. Müller: Ewelina Kudeń
Mr. Deer: Bartłomiej Błaszczyński / Mateusz Znaniecki
Mr. Krause: Łukasz Chmielowski
Mr. Schwander: Krystian Modzelewski

=== Petr Zelenka's Tales of Common Insanity ===
Dir. Grzegorz Chrapkiewicz

A play by contemporary Czech playwright and director Petr Zelenka, it examines male-female relationships, with themes of solitude and love as central elements. The forlorn, misunderstood, lonely and unloved characters of this absurd comedy filled with surrealist sense of humour desperately seek happiness, love and meaning of life. To regain the lost order and sanity they cling to the most risky and magical ways to turn their lives around. As a result, they sink deeper into madness. Madness, which is not at all gloomy, scary and desolating, but instead more ordinary, more human, less bitter. It is a madness experienced sometimes by each and every one of us.

translation: Krystyna Krauze
Direction: Grzegorz Chrapkiewicz
Cast:
Petr: Bartłomiej Błaszczyński
Petr's Mother: Aleksandra Derda
Petr's Father: Krystian Modzelewski
Jana: Joanna Osyda
