= Opportunity class =

Opportunity Classes (OC classes) in New South Wales, Australia are government primary school classes operated by the New South Wales Department of Education and Communities for gifted and talented children. It functions for students grades 5 and 6, and is entered by a test done in grade 4. It is similar to Selective streams and schools

== History ==
Opportunity classes have a long history in NSW, with the first ones established in 1932. The impact of attending Opportunity classes varies with individual students, with some reporting negative experiences, while others report a strong sense of community and wellbeing.

Opportunity classes have been regarded by some parents as feeder schools for selective schools; however, not all students in opportunity classes successfully gain admission to selective schools. Not all Opportunity Class (OC) students apply to attend a selective high school, as in some areas attending a selective high school means either long daily commutes or living away from home. The reality is that entry to both OC and Selective High School classes is via standardized testing that focuses on ability in mathematics, english and general ability (basically an IQ-style test), and that there are fewer places available for entry to OC (~1800) than to Selective High School (4214 places in 2015), so in theory it is 'harder' to gain entry into OC than Selective High School and a large percentage of students attending OC classes gain entry to Selective High School, or gain a scholarship to a private high school.

== Admission ==
Parents of prospective applicants for opportunity classes complete an "Intention to Apply" form provided by the school, then complete an online application. Prospective applicants undertake an aptitude test, consisting of mathematics and English literacy components, the marks for which are sent with assessment scores based on the student's performance in Years 3 and 4 by the applicant's school principal.

== List of schools with opportunity classes ==
The following schools offer admission to opportunity classes in Years 5 and 6.

- Alexandria Park Community School
- Alstonville Public School
- Artarmon Public School
- Ashfield Public School
- Balgowlah Heights Public School
- Balmain Public School
- Bathurst West Public School
- Beecroft Public School
- Biraban Public School
- Blacktown South Public School
- Blacktown West Public School
- Blaxcell Street Public School
- Bradbury Public School
- Brookvale Public School
- Camden South Public School
- Caringbah North Public School
- Casula Public School
- Cessnock West Public School
- Chatswood Public School
- Colyton Public School
- Coonabarabran Public School
- Cudgegong Valley Public School
- Dubbo West Public School
- Dural Public School
- Earlwood Public School
- Ermington Public School
- Georges Hall Public School
- Glenbrook Public School
- Goonellabah Public School
- Gosford Public School
- Goulburn West Public School
- Greenacre Public School
- Greystanes Public School
- Harrington Street Public School
- Holsworthy Public School
- Hurstville Public School
- Illaroo Road Public School
- Ironbark Ridge Public School
- Jewells Public School
- Kingswood Public School
- Leumeah Public School
- Lindfield East Public School
- Lithgow Public School
- Maryland Public School
- Matthew Pearce Public School
- Miranda Public School
- Mona Vale Public School
- Moree Public School
- Maroubra Junction Public School
- Neutral Bay Public School
- Newbridge Heights Public School
- New Lambton South Public School
- North Rocks Public School
- Penrith Public School
- Picnic Point Public School
- Port Macquarie Public School
- Quakers Hill Public School
- Queanbeyan South Public School
- Richmond Public School
- Rutherford Public School
- Ryde Public School
- Smithfield Public School
- Soldiers Point Public School
- South Grafton Public School
- St Andrews Public School
- St Clair Public School
- St Johns Park Public School
- Sturt Public School
- Summer Hill Public School
- Sutherland Public School
- Tahmoor Public School
- Tamworth Public School
- Tamworth South Public School
- Tighes Hill Primary School
- Toongabbie Public School
- Toormina Public School
- Wahroonga Public School
- Waitara Public School
- Wentworth Falls Public School
- Wilkins Public School
- Wollongong Public School
- Woollahra Public School
- Wyong Public School

== See also ==
- National Assessment Program – Literacy and Numeracy (NAPLAN)
- Selective school (New South Wales)
