= Australian Institute of Anatomy =

Founded 1931 Canberra, now NFSA since 1984. Commonwealth Heritage Listed

Australian Institute of Anatomy (former) building
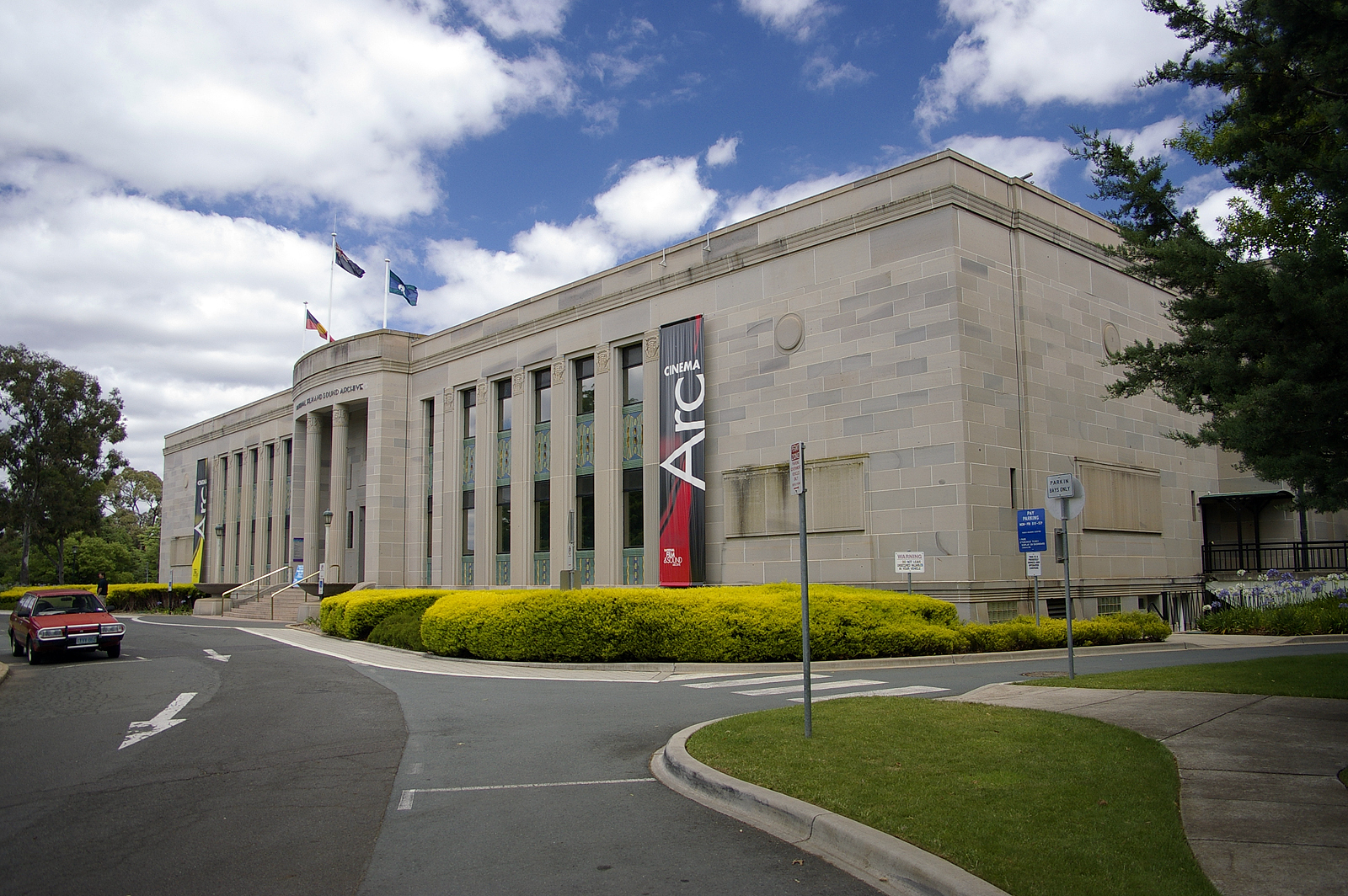
- The National Film and Sound Archive is now located in the former Australian Institute of Anatomy building.
- Alternative names: National Film and Sound Archive building

General information
- Status: Completed
- Architectural style: Inter-war Stripped Classical; Art Deco detailing and decorative elements
- Location: McCoy Cct, Acton, Canberra, Australian Capital Territory, Australia
- Coordinates: 35°16′59″S 149°07′16″E
- Current tenants: National Film and Sound Archive
- Renovated: 1984; 1999; 2019
- Owner: Commonwealth of Australia

Technical details
- Material: Masonry; Hawkesbury sandstone
- Floor count: 3

Design and construction
- Other designers: E. Bruce (landscape)

Commonwealth Heritage List
- Official name: Institute of Anatomy (former), McCoy Cct, Acton, ACT, Australia
- Type: Listed place
- Criteria: A., B., D., F., G.
- Designated: 22 June 2004
- Reference no.: 105351

The Australian Institute of Anatomy was a natural history museum and medical research institute that was founded in 1931 and disbanded in 1985. The institute's heritage-listed building, located in Acton, Canberra, in the Australian Capital Territory, Australia, has been occupied by the National Film and Sound Archive (NFSA) since October 1984. The building was added to the Commonwealth Heritage List on 22 June 2004.

The Australian Institute of Anatomy (AIA) was established in October 1931 following the relocation of the National Museum of Australian Zoology from Melbourne to Canberra. The latter museum was a continuation of the Australian Institute of Anatomical Research, founded in 1919. This organisation was established by Colin Mackenzie to record Australia's native animals, which he feared were to soon become extinct. To further this aim, Mackenzie also established what is now known as Healesville Sanctuary. The AIA served as a natural history museum and conducted human nutrition research. It also cared for material belonging to the Australian Institute of Aboriginal and Torres Strait Islander Studies. In 1980 the National Museum of Australia was established, with one of its aims being to inherit the AIA's collection, which it soon did. The NFSA moved into the building in October 1984, and the remaining Institute was abolished in December 1985.

== Description of the building ==
The site consists of the main building, its surrounds and the former director's residence. The main building is of Late 20th Century Stripped Classical style and has some of the finest examples in Australia of nationalistic Australian Art Deco design and detailing with an array of intact characteristics such as vivid decorative elements that serve no particular function, vertical straight lines, low-relief sculptures and zigzags. The many motifs of Australian animals, Aboriginal art and historic figures in science and medicine recall the Australian Institute of Anatomy, for which the building was designed. Adjacent to the main building is the former director's residence, which is a significant example of an Art Deco residence but with fewer decorative elements than the main building.

As the Institute of Anatomy, it was one of the key public buildings provided by the Federal Capital Commission in the first phase of Canberra's development, built to broaden national interest and establish the city as a centre of archives and collections. Founded and directed by Colin MacKenzie until 1937, the Institute became internationally known, attracting visitors, endowed lectures and additions to its collection.

The construction of the Institute featured creative technical achievements for the era, including hollow block construction and poured reinforced concrete formed in a waffle slab with ribs. The National Film and Sound Archive has occupied the building since 1984. This organisation is widely regarded by the public for its efforts to conserve and promote Australian culture as represented in film, television, radio and sound recordings. The building houses items of enduring cultural significance to Australians. In addition to discs, films, videos, audio tapes, phonograph cylinders and wire recordings, the Archive's collection includes supporting documents and artefacts, such as photographic stills, transparencies, posters, lobby cards, publicity, scripts, costumes, props, memorabilia and sound, video and film equipment.

== History of the building ==
Occupied by the National Film and Sound Archive since October 1984, the building was originally the home of the National Museum of Australian Zoology, and later the Australian Institute of Anatomy from 1931 to 1984. Originally it held the anatomy collection of Sir Colin MacKenzie. This collection included the heart of the celebrated Australian racehorse Phar Lap. MacKenzie became the founding director of the Institute on Anatomy, and on his death in 1938 his ashes were placed behind a commemorative plaque in the building's foyer. Buildings constructed during this phase were 'built to broaden national interest and establish the city as a centre of archives and collections'.

Both grand and austere, the building is often classified as Art Deco, though its overall architectural style is technically Inter-war Stripped Classical. Classical architecture was popular during the 1930s and 1940s but lost favour after the downfall of Germany's Third Reich. The style was again revived in the early 1960s and became common for government buildings in Canberra during this time. Examples include the Law Courts of the ACT (1961) and the National Library of Australia (1968).

Buildings in this style often feature a symmetrical façade, a horizontal skyline, classical columns and a central entrance. Traditional building materials such as stone and terracotta are often employed. The building has described as 'some of the finest examples of nationalistic Australian Art Deco design and detailing in Australia.' The art deco influence is evident in the strong and consistent decorative features of native flora, fauna and Aboriginal art and motifs throughout the building.

The entrance features a curved central bay decorated with goannas, ferns and waratahs. The entrance door itself has a carved stone surround of open-mouthed frilled lizards framed in triangles. Tiled panels beneath the windows at the front of the building have blue and green motifs which resemble Aboriginal bark paintings. The foyer's beautiful interior features a geometrically patterned marble floor. The black marble in the floor was quarried from the Acton Peninsula, now submerged beneath Lake Burley Griffin. The foyer also features a platypus skylight utilising early plastic technologies. Face masks of well-known scientists of the era are featured on the foyer's walls as a reminder of its previous incarnation as the Institute of Anatomy. Beyond the foyer is a tranquil landscaped courtyard. Each side of the courtyard features carved wombat heads over the main arches. The courtyard leads to two galleries which now hold fascinating exhibitions.

The original part of the building has a theatre and research centre. Each area is decorated in geometric art deco patterns, a feature repeated throughout the building in its doors, ventilators and light fittings. The theatre was the meeting place for one of Australia's pioneering film societies in the 1930s—the Canberra Film Society.

In 1984 it became the home of the newly created National Film and Sound Archive. Every effort has been made to retain the heritage aspects of the building in its use as a modern archive, including renovation works on the sandstone facade in 2019.

=== The scientists ===
The foyer walls feature twelve scientists (two of which are death masks):

Name	Lifetime	Nationality	Profession
Sir Harry Brookes Allen	1854–1926	AUS	Pathologist
John Bell	1763–1820	SCO	Anatomist
Charles Darwin	1809–1882	ENG	Naturalist
George Britton Halford	1824–1910	ENG / AUS	Anatomist and physiologist
William Harvey	1578–1657	ENG	Anatomist
John Hunter	1728–1793	SCO	Surgeon
Jean-Baptiste Lamarck	1744–1829	FRA	Naturalist
Joseph Lister	1827–1912	ENG	Surgeon
Louis Pasteur	1822–1895	FRA	Microbiologist and chemist
Sir James Young Simpson	1811–1870	SCO	Obstetrician and anaesthetist
Sir Edward Charles Stirling	1848–1919	AUS	Surgeon
Sir Thomas Anderson Stuart	1856–1920	SCO / AUS	Physiologist

=== Building extensions ===
In 1999, with the National Film and Sound Archive, its then occupant, needing additional space, the building's large triple-level rear wing was opened. This new wing's design is in keeping with the Art Deco style of the main structure with details and finishes to match the original. Today, the building is open to the public as a treasure house of Australian film, television and sound recordings.

== Heritage listings ==
The building was listed on the now defunct Register of the National Estate on 21 October 1980 and on the Commonwealth Heritage List on 22 June 2004.

== Paranormal Events ==
The building is widely considered by paranormal investigators to be one of the most haunted buildings in Australia. Supernatural phenomena have been reported by staff and visitors, with almost all events stemming from the building's history as the Australian Institute of Anatomy. NFSA staff embrace this reputation, maintaining an informal log of paranormal events, and opening the doors after hours for public 'ghost tours'.

=== The theatre and basement ===
Sudden unexplained temperature drops and the sound of heavy footsteps echoing in empty corridors are regularly logged by night-time security guards.

Some visitors to the theatre have reported glimpses of a young girl peering out into the auditorium from beneath the stage.

=== Foyer ===
The Institute's founder, Sir Colin Mackenzie, had his ashes entombed directly inside the stone walls of the foyer. Witnesses have claimed to see an apparition resembling MacKenzie walking through the main entrance hall, then disappearing into the wall in which his ashes are held.

=== 'Blood Room' ===
Located in one of the basements, this room originally served as part of the Institute's morgue. Although now a modernised conference room, original features hint at its original purpose, including a sloped floor and channels in the floor to drain body fluids from cadavers. Visitors to this room frequently report sudden feelings of nausea or panic, or smelling decaying flesh.

=== Former display halls ===
In the halls in which human skeletal remains were historically put on public exhibition, staff have described a young girl wandering these corridors at all hours.
