= Selective school (New South Wales) =

Type of school in Australia

Sydney Boys High School, a selective school

Selective schools in New South Wales, Australia are government high schools operated by the New South Wales Department of Education that accept their students based upon their academic merit.

Each year, approximately 15,000 Year 6 students across the state of New South Wales optionally undertake the Selective High School Placement Test to seek one of the 3,600 places offered for first-year entry into selective high schools. For Year 8 to Year 12 entry into selective schools, students do not take an external test, however they can apply directly to a school for entry. The application package is standard to all government selective schools, with internal selection committees considering applications each year during August or September.

== History ==
The first government selective high schools in New South Wales were established in the late 19th and early 20th centuries. By the turn of the 20th century, the system included both newly founded selective schools and older schools with selective entry that had been incorporated into the framework. Among the earliest were Bathurst High School, Fort Street High School, Goulburn High School, and Sydney High School—later divided into Sydney Boys High School and Sydney Girls High School.

Several of the state’s oldest selective schools have maintained selective status since their inception, including Fort Street (1849), Sydney Boys and Sydney Girls (1883), North Sydney Girls High School (1914), North Sydney Boys High School (1915), Hurlstone Agricultural High School (1959), and James Ruse Agricultural High School (1959).

=== Conversion of selective schools to comprehensive schools ===
Before World War II, most government high schools in New South Wales operated as selective institutions. In 1957, a government report recommended converting these schools to a comprehensive model, reflecting shifts in educational philosophy. From the early 1960s, most selective schools were transitioned to comprehensive status, despite resistance from parents and influential alumni, particularly from inner-city schools such as Fort Street. A small number of selective schools survived the reforms, including Fort Street, Sydney Boys, Sydney Girls, North Sydney Boys, North Sydney Girls, James Ruse and Hurlstone. In 1988, the NSW Government began expanding the number of selective schools and implemented a significant reform by abolishing catchment restrictions, allowing any student in the state to apply to any selective school.

=== Partially selective schools ===
In 1995, the NSW government under Bob Carr introduced the concept of partially selective schools; i.e., schools with both comprehensive and selective streams. In 2010, a further 14 comprehensive high schools adopted this model, adding one or more classes of selective students, along with a "virtual school" that brought together a single class of students from regional NSW. These partially selective schools provide self-contained classes for gifted and talented students in the junior years. In the senior years, the selective and comprehensive streams are often combined, although selective students tend to “self-select” into more advanced courses, such as extension Mathematics and English.

=== Virtual selective school ===
Aurora College is a virtual selective high school for students enrolled in government high schools in rural or remote areas of New South Wales. It began operating in January 2015 with over 160 students and is administered from offices in Lane Cove North. The school enables students to remain in their local communities while studying specialist subjects unavailable at their home schools. Lessons are delivered via video conferencing and other online technologies, allowing students to participate in accelerated classes, collaborate with peers, and attend a residential program held twice a year.

=== Modern-day ===
As of 2025, New South Wales has 47 fully or partially selective government high schools. These include 17 fully selective high schools—some co-educational and others offering single-sex programs—25 partially selective high schools combining selective and comprehensive classes, four selective agricultural high schools, and one virtual selective high school. Of these, 34 are located in the Greater Sydney metropolitan area.

== Admission and criteria ==
=== Profile score ===
In general, entry into a government selective school is determined by a "profile score", which combines school marks in English and mathematics with marks from the Selective High School Placement Test in reading, writing, mathematics and general ability.

The profile score is calculated by adding the component scores for English, mathematics, and general ability, each of which marked out of 100, to produce a total score out of 300.

==== Component scores ====
As of 2019, the component scores are determined as follows:

- General Ability (GA): test marks are scaled statewide to a mean of 60 and a standard deviation of 12, producing a GA component score out of 100.
- Mathematics: the component score is the scaled average of the scaled test mark and the moderated school mark.
  - Raw test marks are scaled statewide (mean = 60, SD = 12) to produce a scaled test mark out of 100.
  - School marks are scaled on a school-by-school basis, adjusting each school's distribution to match the mean and standard deviation of its students' scaled test marks. This produces the moderated school mark.
  - The scaled test mark and moderated school mark are averaged, then re-scaled statewide to a mean of 60 and SD of 12 to form the mathematics score out of 100.
- English: the component score is a scaled weighted average of reading and writing performance.
  - For reading: the school mark is moderated against reading test marks, then averaged with the scaled reading test score.
  - For writing: the school mark is moderated against writing test marks, then averaged with the scaled writing test score.
  - The reading average receives a weighting of two-thirds and the writing average receives one-third. These weighted scores are combined and re-scaled statewide (mean = 60, SD = 12) to produce the English score out of 100.

Scaling and moderation ensure that:

- School and test marks contribute equally.
- School marks from different schools are placed on a common scale, allowing fair comparison.
- Each component (English, mathematics, general ability) has equal weight in the profile score.

==== 2021 changes ====
In 2021, the NSW Government replaced the previous format with a Cambridge-style test consisting of:

- Thinking Skills (formerly GA): 40 questions in 40 minutes.
- Mathematical Reasoning Skills (formerly Mathematics): 35 questions in 40 minutes.
- Reading Skills (formerly Reading): 38 questions in 45 minutes (Formerly 30 questions in 40 minutes).
- Writing: extended to 30 minutes, with a revised stimulus style.

The process also incorporates “wild-score” processing, which identifies students whose test performance is significantly below expectations based on school marks. In such cases, the moderation process adjusts scores to ensure students are not unfairly disadvantaged due to illness, misadventure or similar circumstances affecting performance.

=== Offers ===
By late August, students are notified of one of three possible outcomes for each school application:

- Offer: the student may immediately apply for enrolment at the school;
- Reserve list: the student is placed on a waiting list and may be offered a place if their position on the list is reached;
- Unsuccessful: the student will not be considered for a place.

In some cases, an application may be placed on hold, pending further enquiries by the Department of Education.

=== Other criteria ===
Eligibility criteria also include age, school year level and residency status. Applicants are generally required to be between 11 years, 5 months and 13 years of age at the beginning of the year they commence Year 7, to be enrolled in Year 6 the year prior and to be an Australian and/or New Zealand citizen or an Australian permanent resident. Exemptions to some requirements may be granted in special circumstances or after consultation with the Department of Education.

=== Selective entry into Years 8–11 ===
Students seeking entry to a selective school after the Year 6 placement process may apply to up to three schools. Applications typically involve submitting a portfolio of school reports and achievements, and some schools require additional testing. A common assessment is the Higher Ability Selection Test (HAST), administered by the applicant's first-choice school or the school with the highest priority that requires HAST results. The test assesses reading comprehension, mathematical reasoning, abstract reasoning and written expression to identify students for accelerated learning or enhancement programs.

Some schools instead use EduTest, a method employed mainly by the four highest-ranked schools. Entry into Years 8–11 is highly competitive and places are limited.

== Debate ==
The existence of government selective schools in New South Wales has been a source of ongoing controversy, particularly regarding disparities between selective and comprehensive high schools.

In 2002, an inquiry funded by the NSW Parents and Citizens Association and the NSW Teachers Federation recommended converting 12 of the state's 19 selective high schools into partially selective schools, retaining only seven of the most established institutions: Fort Street, North Sydney Boys, North Sydney Girls, Sydney Boys, Sydney Girls, Sydney Technical and St George Girls. The chair of the inquiry, UNSW Professor Tony Vinson, argued that “wherever possible, talented students should be able to remain within mainstream schools to maximise social cohesion and an inclusive school community”.

Although the report had the support of then NSW Education Minister John Watkins, most of its recommendations, particularly those concerning the status of selective schools, were not implemented. A 2005 report commissioned by the Department of Education found that public opinion across the state school system remained deeply divided on the issue.

The debate was reignited in following a series of Sydney Morning Herald articles criticising selective schools, with claims that they contribute to socioeconomic divisions within Sydney.

=== 2018 Review of Selective Education Access ===
In December 2018, then NSW Minister for Education Rob Stokes announced the findings of the Review of Selective Education Access, which proposed changes to increase representation of girls, students from low socioeconomic backgrounds, students with disabilities and students stronger in English than in other subjects, within selective schools.

The review concluded that:

- The existing selection process is outdated and needs to be revised for future decades;
- Disadvantaged students face unintended barriers to entry;
- The current assessment methods do not fully capture students' true abilities, resulting in some capable students being overlooked; and
- Gaps in the system limit the effectiveness of the selection process.

== See also ==
- List of selective high schools in New South Wales
- Magnet school
- Opportunity class
- Selective school
