= Lover (clothing) =

Australian fashion label

- Type: Fashion label
- Industry: Fashion
- Founded: 2001
- Founders: Susien Chong, Nic Briand
- Headquarters: Sydney, Australia

Lover is an Australian fashion label launched in 2001 by designers Susien Chong and Nic Briand. The label began as a weekend stall at Bondi Markets with a ten-piece collection of random separates. Since then, Lover has risen to prominence in Australia and internationally.

In November, 2017, it went into voluntary administration while administrators Ferrier Hodgson assess the financial position of the company ahead of the pursuit of a prospective sale.

== Background ==
Lover's collections all draw upon inspirations from the worlds of art, music, film and pop culture. Designer Nic Briand says each collection "has a narrative and central character". Influences on the duo include Jean-Luc Godard, early Woody Allen films, Black Flag, Marianne Faithfull. Nic Briand's influences tend to be "heavier" such as the Wu-Tang Clan, comic books and Jimi Hendrix, whereas Susien Chong's are "softer" elements such as Picnic at Hanging Rock, ballet and Roberta Flack.

== Collections ==
=== Melodies (SS 2004) ===
Features a palette of cream, pale blue and black with polka-dot motifs and the Lover trademark oversized buttons. Influences:

- Meg White
- Françoise Hardy

=== Miss Francoise (AW 2004) ===
Black, white, red and midnight blues are used, with oversized buttons and satin. The collection has a masculine edge with pieces such as crisp white shirts, cuffed wide-legged pants and suspenders.

=== Broken Hearts (SS 2005) ===
The Broken Hearts collection features tailored, classic, simple staples in a basic palette of black and white with splashes of red and pink. Lace began to creep into their designs with an off the shoulder number that was featured in Nylon magazine (US). Chong has commented that she was inspired by "lovelorn girls working their way through the crowds at gigs around Sydney".

=== Performance (AW 2005) ===
Performance tells "the story of a shy schoolgirl violin player who is awakened by the sounds of her brother's Led Zeppelin and Black Sabbath records" according to Nic Briand. Influences:

- Freaks and Geeks
- Ballet
- 1970s Rock

=== Black Magick (SS 2006) ===
Pinstriped denim cuffed shorts and the "it" dress of the season, the white lace Black Magick dress. Velvets, denim and folk-influenced floral trimmings made this collection hippie. Influences:

- Folk music
- Charles Manson
- Tarot Cards
- 1960s

=== Lover Loves Levi's (March 2006) ===
The jeans featured an oversized button to fasten the jeans, a black Levi's patch on the back, contrast stitching and a Lover monogrammed lining along the inner waistband. The jeans were made in a limited edition of 1,000 pairs. The jeans were accompanied by a tote bag featuring the Lover monogram and a key ring with a large button motif. Lover was drawn to the collaboration with the denim giant due to the fact that "Levis rock'n'roll youth culture heritage was a perfect fit with the mood of" their A/W About A Girl collection.

=== About a Girl (AW 2006) ===
About A Girl featured bleached-out white, grey/purple plaids and black. Patterned lace tights and skivvies were the base for many of the collection's looks. Vests, pinafores, floaty blouses, playsuits, oversized buttons, cuffed shorts and a stand-out white lacy dress were the threads that linked Lover with their past collections. Influences:

- Kurt Cobain

=== Black Rose Army (SS 2007) ===
The Black Rose Army collection depicts a transformation from innocent and "rich heiress to sex-bomb renegade"; this is the Patty Hearst story. Set to a discordant and raw soundtrack by the Kills the runway show depicts four periods in the Patty Hearst kidnapping saga. The first is innocence; represented via the use of white dresses, blouses and frocks. The next phase is Hearst at college; slogan tees, cuffed shorts, bandanas, denim and louder colour accents such as red, yellow and blue highlight this change, while the slow seeping of black into the palette suggests the darkness which will come. The third period is during her period as a fighter with the SLA; uniform-like khakis drench this radical phases pallet. The last phase is purely black, featuring black corsages to symbolise the death of Patty's innocence. Influences:

- Patty Hearst
- Symbionese Liberation Army, (SLA)
- Berkeley in the 1960s
- Nic Briand commented that Black Rose Army was influenced by the last half of Martin Scorsese's documentary No Direction Home about Bob Dylan, The Kills, Zabriskie Point, the first two Public Enemy albums, Glen E. Friedman's photos of the LA punk scene, the box set of Peanuts with Charlie Brown, Joseph Szabo's Teenage, early blues players Son Lightnin Hopkins and Robert Johnson and Curb Your Enthusiasm.

=== Altamont (AW 2007) ===
Influences:

- Altamont music festival
- The Rolling Stones
- 1970s

=== One Plus One (SS 2008) ===
This was a swimwear line featuring 12 styles in lace knit, French stripe or denim. Reflecting the interest in 1970s skate culture the line was intended to be "At home on the bleachers of a lazy suburban swimming pool mixed with denim jeans or sitting on the beach". To accompany the collection Lover used All-white Vans hi-tops and Authentic Vans in white. Influences:

- Dogtown and Z-Boys
- California in the 1970s
- The Z-Boys skating crew
- 1970s skating culture
- Robert Altman's 3 Women
- Harvest by Neil Young
- Prayer of Death by Entrance
- Electric Ladyland, Jimi Hendrix
- Imagine Our Love, Lavender Diamond
- Brightblack Morning Light

=== Love Bomb (FW 2008/SS 2008.09) ===
The collection includes bell sleeves, velveteen jackets, leather short pants, neck detailing and a tailored jumpsuit.

=== A Dance For One (SS 2011/ AW 2011) ===
In 2011 the label celebrated its ten-year anniversary with a runway show - its first in five years.
