= Raymond Specht =

Australian botanist (1924–2021)

Raymond Specht AO
- Specht in 2018
- Born: Raymond Louis Specht; 19 July 1924; Adelaide, South Australia
- Died: 13 February 2021 (aged 96); Brisbane, Queensland
- Education: University of Adelaide
- Known for: 1948 American-Australian Scientific Expedition to Arnhem Land
- Spouse: Marion Gillies (m. 1952)
- Awards: Order of Australia (2020)
- Scientific career
- Fields: Ecology, conservation
- Workplaces: University of Adelaide; University of Melbourne; University of Queensland; University of Oxford; University of Leeds

Raymond Louis Specht AO (19 July 1924 – 13 February 2021) was an Australian plant ecologist, conservationist and academic, who participated in the Arnhem Land Scientific Expedition of 1948.

== Early life ==
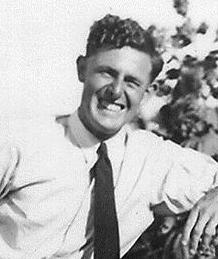
Specht in 1948

Raymond Louis Specht was born in 1924 in Adelaide, South Australia to Louis and Harriet Specht. He attended Richmond Primary School and Adelaide High School, finishing high school as dux in 1941. Specht intended to pursue teaching as a career. In 1942 he was a student teacher in physics, chemistry and mathematics at Riverton High School.

After attending a short course in teaching at the University of Adelaide, he enrolled in Adelaide Teachers College studying biology in 1943. He combined this with studies at the University of Adelaide, and ultimately took his BSc in botany and zoology in 1945 before taking first class honours in plant ecology in 1946.

== Arnhem Land Scientific Expedition ==
Specht was invited to join the National Geographic Society and Smithsonian Institution sponsored Arnhem Land Scientific Expedition in 1946. After completing his Honours project he and the 15 other members of the group set out from Adelaide in March 1948. Specht spent 8 months collecting 25 tonnes of specimens as the group's botanist. The specimens were flown to Brisbane in 1949, identified, and prepared for distribution. Materials were sent to six herbaria within Australia, to Kew in England, the Rijksmuseum in Leiden, the Smithsonian Institution and Arnold Arboretum in the U.S.

Specht returned to Adelaide and spent 14 years working with the specimens from the expedition. He co-edited with Charles P. MountfordVolume 3 of the Expedition, Botany and plant ecology (1958). He also edited Volume 4 entitled Zoology (1964).

Specht was made an Officer of the Order of Australia in 2020 for "distinguished service to science, and to education, in the fields of botany, plant ecology and conservation."

== Personal life ==
Specht married Marion Gillies in 1952. They met on a University of Queensland Science Student Expedition to Fraser Island in 1949. They had one daughter, Alison. Specht died on 13 February 2021.

== Published works ==
- Vegetation of South Australia (1972)
- Conservation Survey of Australia (1974, 1995)
- Heathlands of the World (1979, 1981)
- Mediterranean Ecosystems of the World (1981, 1988)
- Ecological Biogeography of Australia. Volume 1 (1981)
- Co-authored with daughter, Alison Specht, Australian Plant Communities: Dynamics of structure, growth & biodiversity (1999, second edition 2002).
