= Outline of metaphysics =

Overview of and topical guide to metaphysics

The following outline is provided as an overview of and topical guide to metaphysics:

Metaphysics – traditional branch of philosophy concerned with explaining the fundamental nature of being and the world that encompasses it, although the term is not easily defined. Traditionally, metaphysics attempts to answer two basic questions in the broadest possible terms:

1. What is ultimately there or what if it was never there?
2. What is it like?

== Nature of metaphysics ==
Metaphysics can be described as all of the following:

- Branch of philosophy – philosophy is the study of general and fundamental problems, such as those connected with existence, knowledge, values, reason, mind, and language. Philosophy is distinguished from other ways of addressing such problems by its critical, generally systematic approach and its reliance on rational argument.
- Academic discipline – branch of knowledge that is taught and researched at the college or university level. Disciplines are defined (in part), and recognized by the academic journals in which research is published, and the learned societies and academic departments or faculties to which their practitioners belong.

== Branches of metaphysics ==
- Cosmology – study of the general nature of the physical world
  - Physical cosmology – study of the largest-scale structures and dynamics of the Universe and is concerned with fundamental questions about its formation, evolution, and ultimate fate.
    - Big Bang cosmology (standard) – cosmology based on the Big Bang model of the universe. The Big Bang is a theoretical explosion from which all matter in the universe is alleged to have originated approximately 13.799 ± 0.021 billion years ago.
    - Non-standard cosmology – any physical cosmological model of the universe that has been, or still is, proposed as an alternative to the Big Bang model of standard physical cosmology.
      - Plasma cosmology – a non-standard cosmology whose central postulate is that the dynamics of ionized gases and plasmas, rather than gravity, play the dominant roles in the formation, development, and evolution of astronomical bodies and large-scale structures in the universe.
  - Religious cosmology – body of beliefs based on the historical, mythological, religious, and esoteric literature and traditions of creation and eschatology.
    - Abrahamic cosmology – The cosmology of all Abrahamic religions, including the Biblical cosmology of Judaism and Christianity, and Islamic cosmology. Based on the ancient writings from each of these respective religions, it entails a conception of the cosmos as an organised, structured entity, including its origin, order, meaning and destiny.
    - Buddhist cosmology – description of the shape and evolution of the Universe according to the Buddhist scriptures and commentaries.
    - Hindu cosmology – In Hindu cosmology the universe is cyclically created and destroyed. The Hindu literature, such as Vedas, and Puranas, cite the creation of the universe. They describe the aspects of evolution, astronomy, etc.
    - Jain cosmology – description of the shape and functioning of the physical and metaphysical Universe (loka) and its constituents (such as living beings, matter, space, time etc.) according to Jainism, which includes the canonical Jain texts, commentaries and the writings of the Jain philosopher-monks.
    - Taoist cosmology – cosmology based on the School of Yin Yang which was headed by Zou Yan (305 BC – 240 BC). The school's tenets harmonized the concepts of the Wu Xing (Five Phases) and yin and yang. In this spirit, the universe is seen as being in a constant process of re-creating itself, as everything that exists is a mere aspect of qi, which, "condens
    - Zoroastrian Cosmology – In Zoroastrian Cosmology, based on contents of ancient scriptures such as Avesta and Bundahishn, the universe is created by an uncreated and omniscient deity, and is in a perpetual state of conflict with the evil spirit.
    - African Cosmology – African cosmology generally views the universe as a spiritually ordered and interconnected reality in which the physical and spiritual realms are unified, originating from a supreme creator. It emphasizes balance, harmony, and relationality among humans, ancestors, spiritual beings, and nature, with moral conduct seen as essential to sustaining cosmic order and communal well-being.
- Ontology – a central branch of metaphysics. Ontology is the study of the nature of being, becoming, existence, or reality, as well as the basic categories of being and how they relate to each other. In simpler terms, ontology investigates what there is.
  - Mereotopology – deals with the relations among wholes, parts, parts of parts, and the boundaries between parts.
  - Meta-ontology – investigates what we are asking when we ask what there is.
- Philosophy of space and time
- Universal science
- Philosophy of modality
- Philosophy of persons
- Metametaphysics – branch of metaphysics concerned with the foundations of metaphysics (which is concerned primarily with the foundations of reality). It asks: "Do the questions of metaphysics really have answers? If so, are these answers substantive or just a matter of how we use words? And what is the best procedure for arriving at them—common sense? Conceptual analysis? Or assessing competing hypotheses with quasi-scientific criteria?"
  - Philosophical theology – branch of theology and metaphysics that uses philosophical methods in developing or analyzing theological concepts.
    - Natural theology – branch of theology and metaphysics the object of which is the nature of the gods, or of the one supreme God. In monotheistic religions, this principally involves arguments about the attributes or non-attributes of God, and especially the existence of God - arguments which are purely philosophical, and do not involve recourse to any supernatural revelation.
  - Religious metaphysics
    - Sufi metaphysics
      - Al Akbariyya – branch of Sufi metaphysics based on Andalusian Sufi gnostic and philosopher Ibn Arabi's teaching.
- Noetic theory
- Philosophy of causation
- Philosophy of objects
- Realism and anti-realism
- Philosophy of properties

== History of metaphysics ==
- Aristotle's Metaphysics
- History of cosmology
  - Cosmology in medieval Islam
  - Historical cosmologies
  - Timeline of cosmological theories
- History of ontology

== Metaphysical theories ==
=== Metaphysical concepts ===
- Analogy of the divided line
- Arche
- Balance (metaphysics)
- Basic limiting principle
- Best of all possible worlds
- Bradley's regress
- Conatus
- Concrescence (process philosophy)
- Creativity (process philosophy)
- Datum (process philosophy)
- Élan vital
- Eternal objects
- Evidential existentiality
- Four causes
- Hume's fork
- Hyle
- Identity (philosophy)
- Immanence
- Immaterial force
- Information
- Inherence
- Lifeworld
- Matter (philosophy)
- Meaning (existential)
- Meinong's jungle
- Metakosmia
- Monad (philosophy)
- Moral universe
- Motion (physics)
- Natural law
- Necessary and sufficient condition
- Nexus (process philosophy)
- Ontic
- Ousia
- Physical body
- Physis
- Plane of immanence
- Plenitude principle
- Popper's three worlds
- Reduction (philosophy)
- Relational space
- Res extensa
- Stoic Categories
- Subject (philosophy)
- Substantial form
- Teleonomy
- Transcendence (philosophy)
- Transcendentals
- Unity (concept)
- Value (ethics)
- Virtuality
- World disclosure

==== Entity ====
- Entity
- Abstract object
- Abstraction
- Actual entity
- Actus essendi
- Being
- Category of being
- Emergence
- Essence
- Everything
- Existence
- Non-physical entity
- Nothing
- Notion (philosophy)
- Object (philosophy)
- Particular
- Pattern
- Potentiality and actuality
- Principle
- Property (philosophy)
- Quantity
- Reality
- Universal (metaphysics)
- Universalizability
- Unobservable

==== Mind ====
- Mind
- Active intellect
- Choice
- Cogito ergo sum
- Concept
- Experience
- Geist
- Idea
- Incorporeality
- Intellect
- Intention
- Mental representation
- Mental substance
- Perception
- Philosophy of self
- Qualia
- Quality (philosophy)
- Soul
- Thought
- Vertiginous question

==== Time ====
- Time
- A-series and B-series
- Absolute time and space
- Causal closure
- Causality
- Duration (philosophy)
- Epiphenomenon
- Growing block universe
- Phenomenon

==== Truth ====
- Truth
- Aletheia
- Supervenience
- Truth-value link
- Truthmaker

=== Metaphysical philosophies ===
- Absolute idealism
- Absurdism
- Accidentalism (philosophy)
- Action theory (philosophy)
- Actualism
- Anti-realism
- Aristotelianism
- Atomism
- B-theory of time
- British idealism
- Bundle theory
- Compatibilism
- Conceptualism
- Corpuscularianism
- Counterpart theory
- Determinism
- Dualistic cosmology
- Dynamism (metaphysics)
- Dysteleology
- Endurantism
- Epistemicism
- Essentialism
- Eternalism (philosophy of time)
- Exemplification theory
- Existentialism
- Fragmentalism
- Free will illusionism
- Hard determinism
- Hindu idealism
- Humanistic naturalism
- Hylomorphism
- Hylozoism
- Idealism
- Identityism
- Incompatibilism
- Indefinite monism
- Indeterminism
- Irrealism (philosophy)
- Libertarianism (metaphysics)
- Literary nominalism
- Logical atomism
- Logical holism
- Material monism
- Materialism
- Mechanism (philosophy)
- Meliorism
- Mereological essentialism
- Mereological nihilism
- Metaphysical naturalism
- Metaphysical nihilism
- Metaphysical solipsism
- Modal fictionalism
- Modal realism
- Moderate realism
- Monism
- Naturalism (philosophy)
- Necessitarianism
- Nihilism
- Nominalism
- Non-essentialism
- Noneism
- Object-oriented ontology
- Objective idealism
- Objectivism
- Open individualism
- Organicism
- Perdurantism
- Phenomenalism
- Philosophical realism
- Physicalism
- Pirsig's metaphysics of Quality
- Platonic idealism
- Platonic realism
- Pluralism (philosophy)
- Predeterminism
- Process philosophy
- Projectivism
- Quietism
- Rational mysticism
- Reductionism
- Revisionary materialism
- Scientific realism
- Scotistic realism
- Simulation hypothesis
- Solipsism
- Speculative realism
- Spiritualism (philosophy)
- Subjectivism
- Substance theory
- Synechism
- Teleology
- Temporal finitism
- Theory of everything (philosophy)
- Theory of Forms
- Transcendental idealism
- Trope (philosophy)
- Tychism
- Voluntarism (metaphysics)

== Metaphysics organizations ==
- Metaphysical Society of America
- Philosophy of Time Society

=== Defunct organizations or groups ===
- The Metaphysical Club

== Metaphysics publications ==
=== Journals ===
- The Heythrop Journal
- The Journal of Theological Studies
- Philosophy and Theology
- Quodlibet
- Review of Metaphysics

=== Books ===
- An Introduction to Metaphysics – book by Martin Heidegger and is the published version of a lecture course he gave in the summer of 1935 at the University of Freiburg. The book is famous both for its powerful reinterpretation of Greek thought and infamous for its acknowledgement of the Nazi Party.
- Appearance and Reality – 1893 book by the English philosopher Francis Herbert Bradley, the main statement of his metaphysics.
- Being and Nothingness: An Essay on Phenomenological Ontology – 1943 book by philosopher Jean-Paul Sartre. Sartre's main purpose is to assert the individual's existence as prior to the individual's essence. His overriding concern in writing the book was to demonstrate that free will exists.
- Kant and the Problem of Metaphysics – book by the German philosopher Martin Heidegger. It is often referred to simply as the "Kantbook".
- Meditations on First Philosophy (subtitled In which the existence of God and the immortality of the soul are demonstrated) – philosophical treatise by René Descartes first published in 1641 (in Latin). The book is made up of six meditations, in which Descartes first discards all belief in things which are not absolutely certain, and then tries to establish what can be known for sure.
- Metaphysics – one of the principal works of Aristotle. The principal subject is "being qua being", or being understood as being. It examines what can be asserted about anything that exists just because of its existence and not because of any special qualities it has.
- Philosophical Problems of Space and Time – 1963 book by Adolf Grünbaum, who argues that physical geometry and chronometry are in part matters of convention because continuous physical space and time are metrically amorphous.
- The Realms of Being – last major work by Spanish-American philosopher George Santayana. In this work of ontology, he defines four realms of being; The Realm of Essence, The Realm of Matter, The Realm of Truth, and The Realm of Spirit.
- The Unreality of Time – best-known philosophical work of the Cambridge idealist J. M. E. McTaggart. McTaggart argues that time is unreal because our descriptions of time are either contradictory, circular, or insufficient.
- Zen and the Art of Motorcycle Maintenance – philosophical fiction, the first of Robert M. Pirsig's texts in which he explores his Metaphysics of Quality.

== Metaphysicians ==
Metaphysician (also, metaphysicist) – person who studies metaphysics. The metaphysician attempts to clarify the fundamental notions by which people understand the world, e.g., existence, objects and their properties, space and time, cause and effect, and possibility. Listed below are some influential metaphysicians, presented in chronological order:

- Kapila (fl. 7th or 6th century BC) – Vedic sage credited as one of the founders of the Samkhya school of philosophy. He is prominent in the Bhagavata Purana, which features a theistic version of his Samkhya philosophy.
- Parmenides (early 5th century BC) – founder of the Eleatic school of philosophy.
- Heraclitus (c. 535 – c. 475 BC) – pre-Socratic Greek philosopher famous for his insistence on ever-present change in the universe, as stated in his famous saying, "No man ever steps in the same river twice".
- Plato (born 424 or 423 BC; died 348 or 347 BC) – Classical Greek philosopher, mathematician, student of Socrates, writer of philosophical dialogues, and founder of the Academy in Athens, the first institution of higher learning in the Western world. Plato's "metaphysics" is understood as Socrates' division of reality into the warring and irreconcilable domains of the material and the spiritual.
- Aristotle (384–322 BC) – Student of Plato. Aristotle's writings were the first to create a comprehensive system of Western philosophy, including metaphysics. Aristotle defines metaphysics as "the knowledge of immaterial being," or of "being in the highest degree of abstraction."
- Plotinus (born 204 or 205 AD; died 270 AD) – major philosopher of the ancient world. In his system of theory there are the three principles: the One, the Intellect, and the Soul.
- Duns Scotus (1265–1308) – important theologian and philosopher of the High Middle Ages.
- Thomas Aquinas (1225–1274) – Italian Dominican priest of the Catholic Church, and an immensely influential philosopher and theologian in the tradition of scholasticism.
- René Descartes (1596–1650) – "Father of Modern Philosophy". Descartes's metaphysical thought is found in his Meditations on First Philosophy (1641) and Principles of Philosophy (1644).
- Baruch Spinoza (1632–1677) – one of the great rationalists of 17th-century philosophy. He defined "God" as a singular self-subsistent substance, and both matter and thought as attributes of such.
- Gottfried Leibniz (1646–1716) – Leibniz's best known contribution to metaphysics is his theory of monads, as exposited in Monadologie. According to Leibniz, monads are elementary particles with blurred perception of each other, this theory can be viewed as early version of Many-Minds Quantum Mechanics.
- George Berkeley (1685–1753) – Anglo-Irish philosopher whose primary achievement was the advancement of a theory he called "immaterialism" (later referred to as "subjective idealism" by others). This theory denies the existence of material substance and instead contends that familiar objects like tables and chairs are only ideas in the minds of perceivers, and as a result cannot exist without being perceived.
- David Hume (1711–1776) – Scottish philosopher, and one of the most important figures in the history of Western philosophy and the Scottish Enlightenment. He challenged the argument from design in his Dialogues Concerning Natural Religion (1779).
- Immanuel Kant (1724–1804) – German philosopher during the end of the 18th Century Enlightenment. Kant's magnum opus, the Critique of Pure Reason (1781), aimed to unite reason with experience to move beyond what he took to be failures of traditional philosophy and metaphysics.
- Georg W. F. Hegel (1770–1831) – German philosopher, one of the creators of German Idealism. Hegel's thoughts on the person of Jesus Christ stood out from the theologies of the Enlightenment. In his posthumous book, The Christian Religion: Lectures on Philosophy of Religion Part 3, he espouses that, "God is not an abstraction but a concrete God ... God, considered in terms of his eternal Idea, has to generate the Son, has to distinguish himself from himself; he is the process of differentiating, namely, love and Spirit".
- Isaac Newton (1642–1727) – English physicist, mathematician, astronomer, natural philosopher, alchemist, and theologian, who has been "considered by many to be the greatest and most influential scientist who ever lived". He believed in a rationally immanent world, but he rejected the hylozoism implicit in Leibniz and Baruch Spinoza. The ordered and dynamically informed Universe could be understood, and must be understood, by an active reason.
- Arthur Schopenhauer (1788–1860) – German philosopher known for his pessimism and philosophical clarity. Schopenhauer's most influential work, The World as Will and Representation, claimed that the world is fundamentally what humans recognize in themselves as their will.
- Charles Sanders Peirce (1839–1914) – American philosopher, logician, mathematician, and scientist. Peirce divided metaphysics into (1) ontology or general metaphysics, (2) psychical or religious metaphysics, and (3) physical metaphysics.
- Henri Bergson (1859–1941) – French philosopher, influential especially in the first half of the 20th century. Bergson considered change to be the fundamental nature of reality. He opposed mechanistic views of reality, which claimed that future events could theoretically be calculated given enough data on the present and the past.
- Alfred North Whitehead (1861–1947) – English mathematician who became a philosopher. He wrote Process and Reality, the book that founded process philosophy, a major contribution to Western metaphysics. The book is famous for its defense of theism, although Whitehead's God differs essentially from the revealed God of Abrahamic religions.
- Bertrand Russell (1872–1970)
- G. E. Moore (1873–1958)
- R. G. Collingwood (1889–1943)
- Martin Heidegger (1889–1976)
- Rudolf Carnap (1891–1970)
- Gilbert Ryle (1900–1976)
- Dorothy Emmet (1904–2000)
- Jean-Paul Sartre (1905–1980)
- Donald Davidson (1917–2003)
- P. F. Strawson (1919–2006)
- Hilary Putnam (1926–2016)
- Saul Kripke (born 1940)
- Willard V. O. Quine (1908–2000) – American philosopher and logician in the analytic tradition. The problem of non-referring names is an old puzzle in philosophy, which Quine captured eloquently when he wrote, "A curious thing about the ontological problem is its simplicity. It can be put into three Anglo-Saxon monosyllables: 'What is there?' It can be answered, moreover, in a word—'Everything'—and everyone will accept this answer as true."
- Gilles Deleuze (1925–1995) – French philosopher. In his book Nietzsche and Philosophy (1962), Deleuze posits that reality is a play of forces; in Anti-Oedipus (1972), it is a "body without organs"; and in What Is Philosophy? (1991), reality iss a "plane of immanence" or "chaosmos".
- David Malet Armstrong (1926–2014) – Australian philosopher. In metaphysics, Armstrong defends the view that universals exist (although Platonic uninstantiated universals do not exist). Those universals match up with the fundamental particles that science tells us about.
- David K. Lewis (1941–2001) – American philosopher best known for his controversial modal realist stance: that (i) possible worlds exist, (ii) every possible world is a concrete entity, (iii) any possible world is causally and spatiotemporally isolated from any other possible world, and (iv) our world is among the possible worlds.

== Sources ==
- Knight, Douglas A. (1990). "Cosmology". In Watson E. Mills (ed.). Mercer Dictionary of the Bible. Mercer University Press. ISBN 9780865543737.
- Lucas, E. L. (2003). "Cosmology". In Alexander, T. Desmond; Baker, David W. (eds.). Dictionary of the Old Testament: Pentateuch. InterVarsity Press. ISBN 9780830817818.
