= Human subject =

Human subject may refer to:

- Subject (philosophy)
- Human subject research
