= Continuous predicate =

Continuous predicate is a term coined by Charles Sanders Peirce (1839–1914) to describe a special type of relational predicate that results as the limit of a recursive process of hypostatic abstraction.

Here is one of Peirce's definitive discussions of the concept:

When we have analyzed a proposition so as to throw into the subject everything that can be removed from the predicate, all that it remains for the predicate to represent is the form of connection between the different subjects as expressed in the propositional form. What I mean by "everything that can be removed from the predicate" is best explained by giving an example of something not so removable.

But first take something removable. "Cain kills Abel." Here the predicate appears as "— kills —." But we can remove killing from the predicate and make the latter "— stands in the relation — to —." Suppose we attempt to remove more from the predicate and put the last into the form "— exercises the function of relate of the relation — to —" and then putting "the function of relate to the relation" into another subject leave as predicate "— exercises — in respect to — to —." But this "exercises" expresses "exercises the function". Nay more, it expresses "exercises the function of relate", so that we find that though we may put this into a separate subject, it continues in the predicate just the same.

Stating this in another form, to say that "A is in the relation R to B" is to say that A is in a certain relation to R. Let us separate this out thus: "A is in the relation R¹ (where R¹ is the relation of a relate to the relation of which it is the relate) to R to B". But A is here said to be in a certain relation to the relation R¹. So that we can express the same fact by saying, "A is in the relation R¹ to the relation R¹ to the relation R to B", and so on ad infinitum.

A predicate which can thus be analyzed into parts all homogeneous with the whole I call a continuous predicate. It is very important in logical analysis, because a continuous predicate obviously cannot be a compound except of continuous predicates, and thus when we have carried analysis so far as to leave only a continuous predicate, we have carried it to its ultimate elements. (C.S. Peirce, "Letters to Lady Welby" (14 December 1908), Selected Writings, pp. 396–397).

== See also ==
- Bradley's regress
- Unity of the proposition
