= Unity of the proposition =

In philosophy, the unity of the proposition is the problem of explaining how a sentence in the indicative mood expresses more than just what a list of proper names expresses.

== History ==
The problem was discussed under this name by Bertrand Russell, but can be traced back to Plato. In Plato's Sophist, the simplest kind of sentence consists of just a proper name and a universal term (i.e. a predicate). The name refers to or picks out some individual object, and the predicate then says something about that individual.

The difficulty is to explain how the predicate does this. If, as Plato thinks, the predicate is the name of some universal concept or form, how do we explain how the sentence comes to be true or false? If, for example, "Socrates is wise" consists of just a name for Socrates, and a name for the universal concept of Wisdom, how could the sentence be true or false? In either case, the "Socrates" signifies Socrates, and the predicate signifies Wisdom. But the sentence asserts that Socrates is wise. The assertion of wisdom must consist in the assertion of some relation between Socrates and Wisdom. What is this relation?

The problem was discussed much later by Francis Bradley. If we assume that a sentence consists of two objects and a relation that connects them, and we represent this by three names, say John, loving, Mary, how do we express the fact that John loves Mary? For "John", "loving" and "Mary" would name the objects they do, even if this were not a fact. This is known as Bradley's regress.

== Frege, Russell, Wittgenstein ==
The problem became significant in the early development of set theory. Set membership is a formal representation of the relation between the two parts of the proposition, and there are certain philosophical problems connected with this, as Frege realised when he investigated the distinction between concept and object. Assume that "Shergar is a horse" analyses into what "Shergar" names (an "Object", according to Frege), and what "is a horse" names (a "Concept"). Objects are fundamentally different from concepts, otherwise we get the problem of the unity of the proposition. A predicate cannot function as the subject of a sentence. But what are we doing when we talk about the concept is a horse? Aren't we using the expression "the concept is a horse", and isn't that a subject expression, which refers (on Frege's account) to an Object? Yes, says Frege, and on that account the concept is a horse is not a concept at all. This is a dogma that even Frege's most faithful followers found difficult to swallow.

The difficulty was discussed in detail in The Principles of Mathematics by Russell, who saw no resolution.

There appears to be an ultimate notion of assertion, given by the verb, which is lost as soon as we substitute a verbal noun, and is lost when the proposition in question is made the subject of some other proposition. ...Thus the contradiction which was to have been avoided, of an entity which cannot be made a logical subject, appears to have here become inevitable. This difficulty, which seems to be inherent in the very nature of truth and falsehood, is one with which I do not know how to deal with satisfactorily. ...I therefore leave this question to the logicians with the above brief indication of a difficulty. (§ 52)

Consider e.g. "A differs from B". The constituents of this proposition are simply A, difference and B. The proposition relates A and B, using the words "is ... from" in "A is different from B". But if we represent this contribution by words for relations, as e.g. "A <R> difference <R> B" we are back to a list of terms, we are essentially back at Bradley's regress.

A proposition, in fact, is essentially a unity, and when analysis has destroyed the unity, no enumeration of constituents will restore the proposition. The verb, when used as a verb, embodies the unity of the proposition, and is thus distinguishable from the verb considered as a term, though I do not know how to give a clear account of the distinction. (§ 52)

Ludwig Wittgenstein addresses the problem early on in the Tractatus Logico-Philosophicus. In section 2.01 he claims that "states of affairs" are combinations of objects. In section 2.03 he explains that nothing is needed to link the objects, since the objects hang together. The arrangement of words in the sentence corresponds to the arrangement or structure of objects in the state of affairs expressed by the sentence. This is the so-called picture theory of the proposition.

== See also ==
- Bradley's regress
- Third man argument

== Bibliography ==
- Candlish, S., "The Unity of the Proposition and Russell’s Theories of Judgment", in Bertrand Russell and the Origins of Analytical Philosophy, ed. Monk & Palmer (Bristol 1996).
- Davidson, D., Truth and Predication, (MIT Press 2005).
- Gaskin, R., The Unity of the Proposition, (Oxford 2008).
- Gibson, M., From Naming to Saying. The Unity of the Proposition, (Oxford 2004).
- Joachim, H., The Nature of Truth, (Oxford 1906)
- Linsky L., "The Unity of the Proposition", Journal of the History of Philosophy 1992, 30.
- Russell, B., The Principles of Mathematics, (Oxford 1903).
