= J. M. E. McTaggart =

English philosopher (1866–1925)

J. M. E. McTaggart FBA
- Portrait by Walter Stoneman, 1917
- Born: John McTaggart Ellis; 3 September 1866; London, England
- Died: 18 January 1925 (aged 58); London, England
- Other name: John McTaggart Ellis McTaggart
- Spouse: Margaret Elizabeth Bird (m. 1899)

Education
- Education: Trinity College, Cambridge
- Academic advisors: Henry Sidgwick; James Ward

Philosophical work
- Era: 19th-/20th-century philosophy
- Region: Western philosophy
- School: British idealism
- Institutions: Trinity College, Cambridge
- Notable students: C. D. Broad; G. E. Moore; Bertrand Russell
- Main interests: Metaphysics; ethics; philosophy of religion
- Notable ideas: The unreality of time (A-series and B-series); B-theory of time; McTaggart's paradox; McTaggartian change

John McTaggart Ellis McTaggart (Note: Pronounced /məkˈtæɡərt/.) (3 September 1866 – 18 January 1925) was an English philosopher best known for his work in philosophy of time. For most of his life McTaggart was a fellow and lecturer in philosophy at Trinity College, Cambridge. McTaggart is widely known for "The Unreality of Time" (1908), in which he argues that time is unreal. He was an exponent of the philosophy of Georg Wilhelm Friedrich Hegel and among the most notable of the British idealists.

== Biography ==
=== Early life and education ===
McTaggart was born on 3 September 1866 in London to cousins Francis Ellis (son of Thomas Flower Ellis) and Caroline Ellis. At birth, he was named John McTaggart Ellis, after his great-uncle, Sir John McTaggart. Early in his life, his family took the surname McTaggart as a condition of inheritance from that same uncle.

McTaggart attended Clifton College, Bristol, before going up to Trinity College, Cambridge, in 1885. At Trinity he was taught for the Moral Sciences Tripos by Henry Sidgwick and James Ward, both distinguished philosophers.

=== Academic career ===
After obtaining First class honours (the only student of Moral Sciences to do so in 1888), he was, in 1891, elected to a prize fellowship at Trinity on the basis of a dissertation on Hegel's Logic. McTaggart had in the meantime been President of the Union Society, a debating club, and a member of the secretive Cambridge Apostles society. In 1897 he was appointed to a college lectureship in Philosophy, a position he would hold until his retirement in 1923 (although he continued to lecture until his death). He received the honorary degree Doctor of Letters from the university in May 1902.

=== Death ===
He died in London on 18 January 1925.

== Philosophy ==
=== Hegel scholarship ===
McTaggart's earlier work was devoted to an exposition and critique of Hegel's metaphysical methods and conclusions and their application in other fields. His first published work Studies in Hegelian Dialectic (1896), an expanded version of his Trinity fellowship dissertation, focused on the dialectical method of Hegel's Science of Logic. His second work Studies in Hegelian Cosmology (1901) is directed more towards a critique of the applications of Hegelian ideas made, both by Hegel and earlier neo-Hegelians, to the fields of ethics, politics and religion. In this book a number of his distinctive doctrines already appear, for example, his belief in human immortality. His final book specifically on Hegel was A Commentary on Hegel's "Logic" (1910), in which he attempted to explain and, to an extent, defend the argument of the Science of Logic.

Although he defended the dialectical method broadly construed and shared a similar outlook to Hegel, McTaggart's Hegelianism was not uncritical and he disagreed significantly both with Hegel himself and with earlier neo-Hegelians. He believed that many specific features of Hegel's argument were gravely flawed and was similarly disparaging of Hegel's application of his abstract thought. However, he by no means reached the same conclusions as the previous generations of British idealists and in his later work came to hold strikingly different and original views. Nonetheless, in spite of his break from earlier forms of Hegelianism, McTaggart inherited from his predecessors a pivotal belief in the ability of a priori thought to grasp the nature of the ultimate reality, which for him like earlier Hegelians was the absolute idea. Indeed, his later work and mature system can be seen as largely an attempt to give substance to his new conception of the absolute.

McTaggart's metaphysics was motivated by psychological concerns, he stated: "the utility of Metaphysic is to be found in the comfort it can give us".

=== McTaggart's paradox ===
McTaggart is best known today for his attempt to prove that our concept of time involves a contradiction and that therefore reality cannot be temporal. It follows that our perception of time is an illusion, and that time itself is merely ideal. His argument for this point is popularly known as McTaggart's paradox. The argument first appeared in the form of a journal article called "The Unreality of Time" (1908), but reappeared later as Chapter 33, 'Time', in the posthumously published Second Volume of his most famous book The Nature of Existence, published in 1927. He introduced the notions of the "A series" and "B series", representing two different ways that events appear to have a position in time. The A series corresponds to our everyday notions of past, present, and future. The A series is "the series of positions running from the far past through the near past to the present, and then from the present to the near future and the far future" (p. 458). This is contrasted with the B series, in which positions are ordered from earlier-than to later-than relations. Thus the A series represents the events in time in a moving relation (from future to present to past) to the temporally moving observer, whereas the B series orders the time events as in firm and fixed relations to other time events.

McTaggart argued that the A series was a necessary component of any full theory of time since change only occurs in the A series, but that it was also self-contradictory and that our perception of time was, therefore, ultimately an incoherent illusion.

==== The necessity of the A series ====
The first, and longer, part of McTaggart's argument is his affirmative answer to the question "whether it is essential to the reality of time that its events should form an A series as well as a B series" (p. 458). Broadly, McTaggart argues that if events are not ordered by an A as well as a B series then there cannot be said to be change. At the centre of his argument is the example of the death of Queen Anne. This event is a death, it has certain causes and certain effects, it is later than the death of Queen Elizabeth etc., but none of these properties change over time. Only in one respect does the event change:

"It began by being a future event. It became every moment an event in the nearer future. At last it was a present event. Then it became past, and will always remain so, though every moment it becomes further and further past. Thus we seem forced to the conclusion that all change is only a change in the characteristics imparted to events by their presence in the A series" (p. 460).

This half of McTaggart's argument has, historically, received less attention than the second half.

==== The incoherence of the A series ====
McTaggart's attempted proof of the incoherence of the A series (the argument of pages 468–9) appears in the original paper only as a single part of a broader argument for this conclusion. According to the argument, the contradiction in our perception of time is that all events exemplify all three of the properties of the A-series, viz. being past, present and future. As McTaggart himself notes, the obvious response is that while exemplifying all three properties at some time, no event exemplifies all three at once, no event is past, present, and future. A single event is present, will have been future, will be past, and here there is, it seems, no contradiction. However, McTaggart argues that this response gives rise to a vicious circle and infinite regress. There is a vicious circle because the response requires us to invoke the A-series determinations of future, present, and past to explain how the events of the series do not exemplify those determinations simultaneously but successively. And there is an infinite regress because invoking tense to explain how different tenses are exemplified successively, gives rise to second-order tenses that again are incompatible unless we again invoke tense to show how they are exemplified successively, etcetera ad infinitum. It bears mentioning that in the mature version of the argument McTaggart gave up the claim that there is a vicious circle, and only held that there is a vicious regress.

One can convey the basic idea of the vicious regress in the following way. In order to avoid the initial apparent contradiction that events have incompatible tenses, one has to construe "a second A series, within which the first falls, in the same way in which events fall within the first" (p. 469). But even if the idea of a second A series within which the first falls makes sense (and McTaggart doubts it does, p. 469), it will face the same contradiction. And so, we must construct a third A series within which the second falls. And this will require the construction of a fourth A series and so on ad infinitum. At any given stage the contradiction will appear; however far we go in constructing A series, each A series will be, without reference to a further A series containing it, contradictory. One ought to conclude, McTaggart argues, that the A series is indeed contradictory and, therefore, does not exist.

Whether McTaggart's argument for the incoherence of the A series works or not, is one of the most hotly debated issues in the philosophy of time (see the entry for "The Unreality of Time" for a more thorough discussion).

=== Mature system: The Nature of Existence ===
In his later work, particularly his two-volume The Nature of Existence (1921–27), McTaggart developed his own, highly original, metaphysical system. The most famous element is his defence of "The Unreality of Time", but McTaggart's system was much broader. In The Nature of Existence McTaggart defended a similar Hegelian view of the universe to that of his earlier work on the basis not of Hegel's dialectics but rather in the mode of more modern metaphysics.

McTaggart concluded the world was composed of nothing but souls, each soul related to one or more of the others by love. He argued against belief in God since he denied the absolute any single personality (thereby justifying his atheism). His philosophy, however, was fundamentally optimistic. McTaggart believed each of the souls (which are identified with human beings) to be immortal and defended the idea of reincarnation. McTaggart held the view that all selves are unoriginated and indestructible. The Nature of Existence also seeks to synthesise McTaggart's denial of the existence of time, matter etc. with their apparent existence.

Despite the mystical tone of its conclusions, the philosophical method of The Nature of Existence is far from mystical. McTaggart arrived at his conclusions by a careful analysis of the essential requirements of any successful metaphysical system (Volume I) followed by a purported proof that only his system satisfies these requirements (Volume II). The logical rigour of his system is in evidence, for example, in McTaggart's famous attempted proof of the unreality of time.

== Influence ==
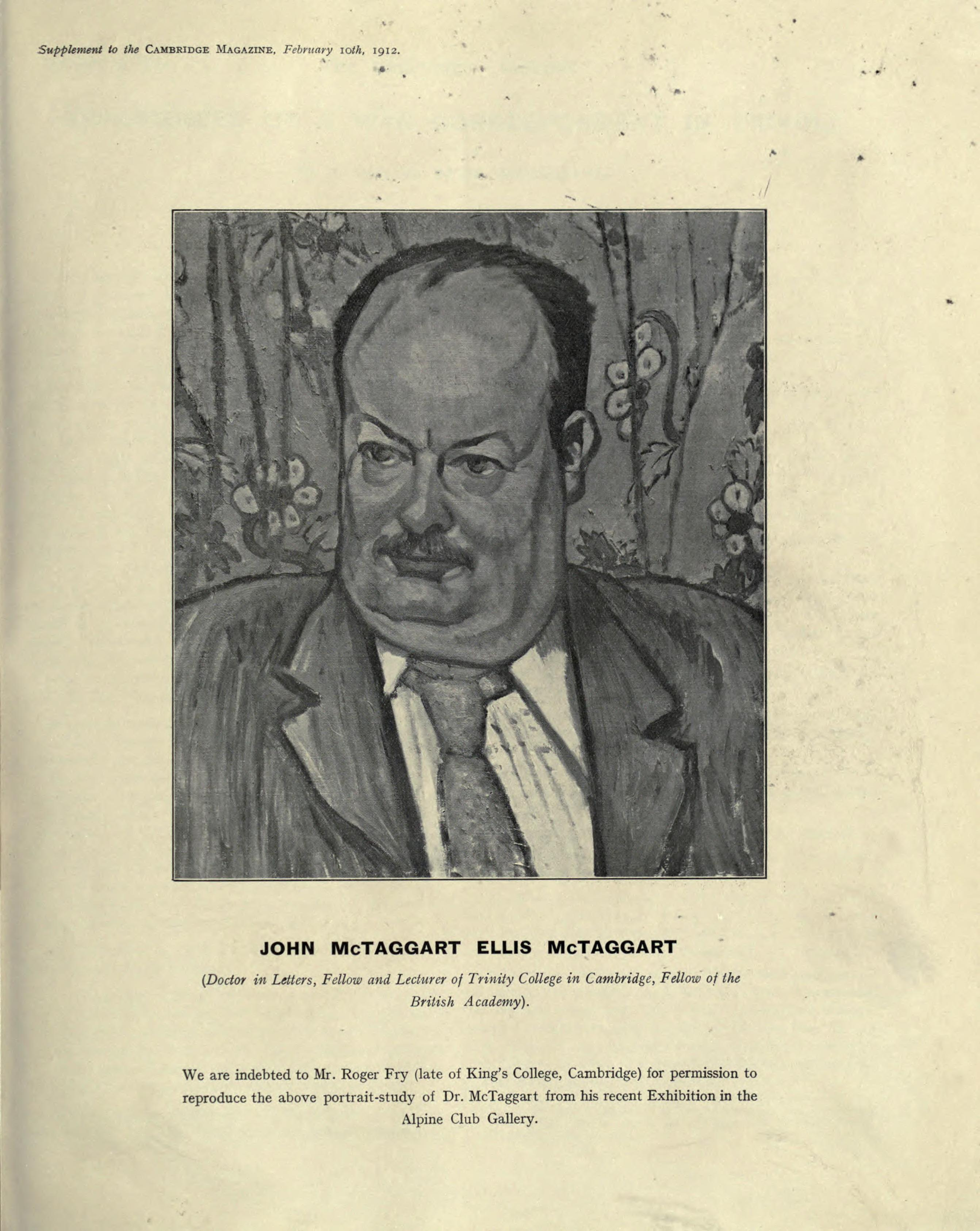
Depiction of John McTaggart Ellis McTaggart by Roger Fry

McTaggart was a friend and teacher of Bertrand Russell and G. E. Moore, and, according to Norbert Wiener, the three were known as "The Mad Tea-Party of Trinity" (with McTaggart as the Dormouse). Along with Russell and Moore, McTaggart was a member of the Cambridge Apostles through which he would have a personal influence on an entire generation of writers and politicians (his involvement with the Apostles presumably overlapped with that of, among others, the members of the Bloomsbury group).

In particular, McTaggart was an early influence on Bertrand Russell. It was through McTaggart that the young Russell was converted to the prevalent Hegelianism of the day, and it was Russell's reaction against this Hegelianism that began the arc of his later work.

McTaggart was the most influential advocate of neo-Hegelian idealism in Cambridge at the time of Russell and Moore's reaction against it, as well as being a teacher and personal acquaintance of both men. With F. H. Bradley of Oxford he was, as the most prominent of the surviving British idealists, the primary target of the new realists' assault. McTaggart's indirect influence was, therefore, very great. Given that modern analytic philosophy can arguably be traced to the work of Russell and Moore in this period, McTaggart's work retains interest to the historian of analytic philosophy despite being, in a very real sense, the product of an earlier age.

The Nature of Existence, with T. H. Green's Prolegomena to Ethics and Bradley's Appearance and Reality, marks the greatest achievement of British idealism, and McTaggart was the last major British idealist of the classic period (for the later development of British idealism, see T. L. S. Sprigge).

McTaggart's "The Unreality of Time" has been widely discussed in philosophical literature. Historian of philosophy Emily Thomas has commented that "philosophers have since written tens of thousands of pages about it. Twenty-first-century thinkers have cited it more than 1,600 times so far – an extraordinary achievement for a vintage journal article".

== Personal life ==
In 1899 he had married Margaret Elizabeth Bird in New Zealand whom he met while visiting his mother (then living near New Plymouth, Taranaki) and was survived by her; the couple had no children.

=== Political views ===
McTaggart, although radical in his youth, became increasingly conservative and was influential in the expulsion of Bertrand Russell from Trinity for pacifism during World War I. But McTaggart was a man of contradictions: despite his conservatism, he was an advocate of women's suffrage, and though an atheist from his youth was a firm believer in human immortality and a defender of the Church of England. He had an encyclopaedic knowledge of English novels and eighteenth-century memoirs.

== Awards and honors ==
His honours included an honorary Doctor of Laws degree from the University of St Andrews and Fellowship of the British Academy.

== Works ==
=== Books and monographs ===
- 1893 The Further Determination of the Absolute (privately printed)
- 1896 Studies in the Hegelian Dialectic Cambridge University Press.
- 1901 Studies in Hegelian Cosmology Cambridge University Press, revised second edition 1918.
- 1906 Some Dogmas of Religion London: Arnold.
- 1910 A Commentary on Hegel's 'Logic' Cambridge University Press.
- 1916 Human Immortality and Pre-existence London: Arnold.
- 1921–27 The Nature of Existence: in two volumes, Cambridge University Press: Volume 1 (idem) 1921; Volume 2 (idem) 1927.
- 1934 Philosophical studies, edited with an introduction by S.V. Keeling. London: Arnold.

=== Articles ===
- 1892, "The Changes of Method in Hegel's Dialectic", Mind v.1, pp. 56–71 & 188–205.
- 1895, "The Necessity of Dogma", International Journal of Ethics 5, pp. 147–162.
- 1896, "Hegel's Theory of Punishment", International Journal of Ethics 6, pp. 479–502.
- 1897, "Hegel's Treatment of the Categories of the Subjective Notion", Mind 6, pp. 164–181 & 342–358.
- 1897, "The Conception of Society as an Organism", International Journal of Ethics 7, pp. 414–434.
- 1900, "Hegel's Treatment of the Categories of the Idea", Mind 9, pp. 145–183.
- 1904, "Human Pre-Existence", International Journal of Ethics, pp. 83–95.
- 1902, "Hegel's Treatment of the Categories of Quality", Mind 11, pp. 503–526.
- 1903, "Some Considerations Relating to Human Immortality", International Journal of Ethics 13, pp. 152–171
- 1904, "Hegel's Treatment of the Categories of Quantity", Mind 13, pp. 180–203.
- 1908, "The Unreality of Time", Mind 17, pp. 457–474.
- 1908, "The Individualism of Value", International Journal of Ethics 18, pp. 433–445.
- 1909, "The Relation of Time and Eternity", Mind 18, pp. 343–362.
- 1915, "The Meaning of Causality", Mind 24, pp. 326–344.
- 1923, "Propositions Applicable to Themselves", Mind 32, pp. 462–464.
