= Essays on Truth and Reality =

1914 book by F. H. Bradley

- Author: Francis Herbert Bradley
- Language: English
- Subject: Epistemology
- Published: 1914
- Publication place: United Kingdom
- Media type: Print
- ISBN: 978-1463729936

Essays on Truth and Reality is a 1914 book by the English philosopher Francis Herbert Bradley, in which the author expounds his philosophy of absolute idealism and gives the classic statement of a coherence theory of truth and knowledge.

== Reception ==
The British philosopher Timothy Sprigge has suggested that in some respects Bradley's absolute idealism receives a better exposition in Essays on Truth and Reality than it had in Bradley's earlier work Appearance and Reality (1893). He notes that Bradley's coherence theory of truth is the classic statement of such a position, comparing Bradley's views to those of Willard Van Orman Quine.
