= Bradley's regress =

Philosophical problem

Bradley's regress is a philosophical problem concerning the nature of relations. It is named after the English philosopher F. H. Bradley who discussed the problem in his 1893 book Appearance and Reality. It bears a close kinship to the issue of the unity of the proposition.

== Description ==
Bradley raises the problem while discussing the bundle theory of objects, according to which an object is merely a "bundle" of properties. This theory raises the question of how the various properties that together comprise an object are related when they in fact comprise an object. More generally, the question that arises is what has to be the case for any two things to be related. Bradley's Regress appears to show that the notion of two things being related generates an infinite regress.

Suppose, for example, that a respects b. This state of affairs seems to involve three things: a, b, and the relation of respecting. For the state of affairs of a respecting b to obtain, it doesn't, however, suffice that these three things (a, b, and the relation of respecting) exist. They must also be related in some way. What is required, we might say, is that a and b "stand in" the relation of respecting. But now we seem to have another state of affairs: the state of affairs of a and b standing in the relation of respecting. This state of affairs in turn seems to involve four things: a, b, the relation of respecting, and the relation of standing in. Again, however, for it to be the case that a and b stand in the relation of respecting, it doesn't suffice that these four items exist. They must also be related in some way. What is required, we might now say, is that a, b, and the relation of respecting stand in the relation of standing in. And so on, ad infinitum.

== Responses ==
In Appearance and Reality, Bradley seems to conclude that the regress should lead us to abandon the idea that relations are "independently real". One way to take this suggestion is as recommending that in the case of a respecting b, we are dealing with a state of affairs that has only two constituents: a and b. It does not, in addition, involve a third item, "the relation of respecting", to which a and b must then bear some further relation ("standing in").

A different option is to accept that the regress is real, but to deny that it is a vicious regress.

A third option, taken by P.F. Strawson and Gustav Bergmann, is to deny the proposition that instantiation is a relation. Gottlob Frege went even further by rejecting instantiation altogether. William F. Vallicella criticized both options; according to Vallicella, both options fail because they cannot explain why objects and properties are connected.

Michael Della Rocca uses a version of Bradley's regress to argue in favor of strict monism, which denies that relations or distinctions are intelligible. On his view, "if we are to retain the notion of substance or being at all, then, instead of individuated, differentiated substances or beings, we should accept only undifferentiated substance or being that stands in no relations of distinction, either internal or external. There is simply substance or being. Similarly, there is simply action, there is simply knowledge, there is simply meaning. And, of course, there is no distinction between being, action, knowledge, and meaning."

== See also ==
- Unity of the proposition
- Third man argument
- Fact
