= Knut Erik Tranøy =

Norwegian philosopher (1918–2012)

- Born: 10 December 1918; Kristiania, Norway
- Died: 19 March 2012 (aged 93)
- Awards: Order of St. Olav (2002)

Education
- Education: University of Cambridge (PhD, 1953)
- Doctoral advisor: C. D. Broad

Philosophical work
- Era: Contemporary philosophy
- Region: Western philosophy
- School: Analytic
- Institutions: University of Bergen; University of Oslo
- Main interests: Ethics

Knut Erik Tranøy (10 December 1918 – 19 March 2012) was a Norwegian philosopher.

During World War II Tranøy, along with 700 other Norwegian students, was deported to the Buchenwald concentration camp in Germany. He was appointed professor at the University of Bergen from 1959, and at the University of Oslo from 1978. His main contributions have been in fields of ethics, particularly in medicine and science. He is a member of the Norwegian Academy of Science and Letters from 1979. He was decorated as Knight, First Class of the Royal Norwegian Order of St. Olav in 2002.

He resided at Fossum terrasse.

== Selected works ==
- Tysklandsstudentene (1946) (co-authored with Michael Sars)
- On the Logic of Normative Systems (1953, thesis)
- Thomas Aquino som moralfilosof. 1957.
- The Moral Import of Science. Essays on Normative Theory, Scientific Activity and Wittgenstein (1998)
