= The Unreality of Time =

1908 philosophy article by J. M. E. McTaggart

"The Unreality of Time" is the best-known philosophical work of British idealist J. M. E. McTaggart. In the argument, first published as a journal article in Mind in 1908, McTaggart argues that time is unreal because our descriptions of time are either contradictory, circular, or insufficient. A slightly different version of the argument appeared in 1927 as one of the chapters in the second volume of McTaggart's most well known book, The Nature of Existence.

The argument for the unreality of time is popularly treated as a stand-alone argument that does not depend on any significant metaphysical principles (e.g. as argued by C. D. Broad 1933 and L. O. Mink 1960). R. D. Ingthorsson disputes this, and argues that the argument can only be understood as an attempt to draw out certain consequences of the metaphysical system that McTaggart presents in the first volume of The Nature of Existence.

It is helpful to consider the argument as consisting of three parts. In the first part, McTaggart offers a phenomenological analysis of the appearance of time, in terms of the now famous A-series and B-series. In the second part, he argues that a conception of time as only forming a B-series but not an A-series is an inadequate conception of time because the B-series does not contain any notion of change. The A-series, on the other hand, appears to contain change and is thus more likely to be an adequate conception of time. In the third and final part, he argues that the conception of time forming an A-series is contradictory and thus nothing can be like an A-series. Since the A-series and the B-series exhaust possible conceptions of how reality can be temporal, and neither is adequate, the conclusion McTaggart reaches is that reality is not temporal at all.

== The phenomenological analysis: the A- and B-series ==
To frame his argument, McTaggart initially offers a phenomenological analysis of how time appears to us in experience. McTaggart claims that time appears in the form of events standing in temporal positions, of which there are two kinds. On the one hand events are earlier than and later than each other, and on the other hand they are future, present, and past, and continually changing their position in terms of futurity, presentness, and pastness. The two kinds of temporal positions each represent events in time as standing in a certain order which McTaggart chooses to call the A-series and the B-series. The A-series represents the series of positions determined as future, present, and past, and which continuously pass from the distant future towards the present, and through the present into the remote past. The B-series represents the series of positions determined as earlier than or later than each other.

The determinations of the B-series hold between the events in time, and never change. If an event ever is earlier or later than some other event, then their respective position in time never changes. The determinations of the A-series must hold to something outside of time, something that does not itself change its position in time, but in relation to which the events in time pass from being future, present, and past. McTaggart does not suggest the present, or NOW, as this something whose position in time is fixed and unchanging instead claiming that it will be difficult to identify any such entity (seeing as it is outside time). Broad explains that McTaggart believed that the difficulty of identifying this entity was serious enough in its own right to be persuaded that time is unreal, but thinks that the contradiction of the A-series is still more convincing; for that reason he leaves this particular difficulty aside.

== The atemporality of the B-series ==
McTaggart argues that the conception of time as only forming a B-series is inadequate because the B-series does not change, and change is of the essence of time. If any conception of reality represents it as changeless, then this is a conception of an atemporal reality. The B-series does not change because earlier-later relationships never change (e.g. the year 2010 is always later than 2000). The events that form a B-series must therefore also form an A-series in order to count as being in time, i.e. they must pass from future to present, and from present to past, in order to change.

The A-series and B-series are not mutually exclusive. If events form an A-series they automatically also form a B-series (anything in the present is earlier than anything in the future, and later than everything past). The question is not therefore whether time forms an A- or a B-series; the question is whether time forms both an A-series and a B-series, or only a B-series.

The proponents of the B-view of time typically respond by arguing that even if events do not change their positions in the B-series, it does not follow that there can be no change in the B-series. This conclusion only follows if it is assumed that events are the only entities that can change. There can be change in the B-series in the form of objects bearing different properties at different times.

The suggestion that the B-view of time can escape the problem by appealing to particulars that endure through time and have different properties at different times is controversial in its own right, but it is generally assumed that this is a controversy that has nothing to do with McTaggart. Instead it is treated as a separate issue, the question of whether things can endure in B-time. However, as Ingthorsson has argued, McTaggart does discuss variation in the properties of persistent entities in the 1st Volume of The Nature of Existence, and there comes to the conclusion that variation in the properties of things between times is not change but mere variation between the temporal parts of things.

== The contradiction of the A-series ==
Attacking the A-series, McTaggart argues that any event in the A-series is past, present, and future, which is contradictory in that each of those properties excludes the other two. McTaggart admits that the contradictory nature of the A-series may not be obvious, because it would appear that events never are simultaneously future, present, and past, but only successively so. However, there is a contradiction, he insists, because any attempt to explain why they are future, present, and past, at different times is (i) circular because we would need to describe the successive order of those "different times" again by invoking the determinations of being future, present or past, and (ii) this in turn will inevitably lead to a vicious infinite regress. The vicious infinite regress arises, because to explain why the second appeal to future, present, and past, doesn't lead again to the same difficulty all over, we need to explain that they in turn apply successively and thus we must again explain that succession by appeal to future, present, and past, and there is no end to such an explanation. It is the validity of the argument in favour of a vicious infinite regress that has received the most attention in 20th Century philosophy of time.

In the later version of the argument, in The Nature of Existence, McTaggart no longer advances the circularity objection. This is, arguably, because by then he has come to treat tense as a simple and indefinable notion, and thus cannot contend that the terms need to be explained at all in order to be applied. He now instead argues that even if it is admitted that they are simple and indefinable, and thus can be applied without further analysis, they still lead to contradiction.

Philosophers who favour the B-view of time tend to find McTaggart's argument against the A-series to demonstrate conclusively that tense involves a contradiction. On the other hand, philosophers who favour the A-view of time struggle to see why the argument should be considered to have any force. Two of the most commonly invoked objections are, first, that McTaggart is mistaken about the phenomenology of time; that he is claiming to see a contradiction in the appearance of time, where none is apparent. Second, that McTaggart is mistaken about the semantics of tensed discourse. The idea here is that claims like "M is present, has been future, and will be past" can only imply a contradiction if it is interpreted as saying that M is all at once future in the past, present in the present, and also past in the future. This interpretation has been criticized as absurd, on the grounds that expressions such as "has been" and "will be" refer not to how M is at present, but to how M once was and is no longer, or how it will be but is not yet. Hence it is wrong to think of the expression as an attribution to M of futurity, presentness, and pastness, all at once.

Ingthorsson has argued that the reason for this incommensurability between the proponents of the A-views and B-views is found in the prevailing view that McTaggart's argument is a stand-alone argument. If it is read in that way, the proponents of each view will understand the argument against the background of their respective views of time, and come to incompatible conclusions. Indeed, on closer scrutiny it will be found that McTaggart explicitly claims that in "The Unreality of Time" he is inquiring whether reality can have the characteristics it appears to have in experience (notably being temporal and material) given his earlier conclusions about what reality must really be like in Absolute Reality. In the introduction to the 2nd Volume of The Nature of Existence, he says:

Starting from our conclusions as to the general nature of the existent, as reached in the earlier Books, we shall have to ask, firstly which of these characteristics can really be possessed by what is existent, and which of them, in spite of the primâ facie appearance to the contrary, cannot be possessed by anything existent (1927: sect. 295).

And he continues:

It will be possible to show that, having regard to the general nature of the existent as previously determined, certain characteristics, that we consider here for the first time, cannot be true of the existent (1927: sect. 298).

As Ingthorsson notes, the most central result of McTaggart's earlier inquiry into the general nature of the existent in Absolute Reality, an inquiry McTaggart claims is based entirely on a priori arguments (i.e. such as do not rely on any empirical observations), is that existence and reality coincide and have no degrees: either something exists and thus is real, or it does not. It immediately follows that for the future and past to be real, they must exist. This is why he interprets the statement "M is present, has been future, and will be past" as a statement about M existing in the present bearing the property of being present, and existing in the past bearing the property of being future, and existing in the future bearing the property of being past. This interpretation of the expression, if correct, does say that M is future, present, and past, which is contradictory. However, since it starts from the premise that the future and past can only be real by existing, then it remains to show that this is what the A-view of time assumes.

== The C-series ==
Having come to the conclusion that reality can neither form an A- nor a B-series, despite appearances to the contrary, then McTaggart finds it necessary to explain what the world is really like such that it appears to be different from what it appears to be. Here is where the C-series comes into play. McTaggart does not say much about the C-series in the original journal article, but in The Nature of Existence he devotes six whole chapters to discuss it.

The C-series is rarely given much attention. When it is mentioned, it is described as "an expression synonymous with 'B-series' when the latter is shorn of its temporal connotations". There is a grain of truth in this, but there is more to the C-series than this. Stripping the temporal features from the B-series only gives what the C-series and B-series have minimally in common, notably the constituents of the series and the formal characteristics of being linear, asymmetric, and transitive. However, the C-series has features that the B-series does not have. The constituents of the C-series are mental states (a consequence of McTaggart's argument in Ch. 34 of The Nature of Existence that reality cannot really be material), which are related to each other on the basis of their conceptual content in terms of being included in and inclusive of. These atemporal relations are meant to provide what the earlier/later than relation cannot, notably explain why an illusion of change and temporal succession can arise in an atemporal reality.

== Influence ==
McTaggart's argument has had an enormous influence on the philosophy of time. His phenomenological analysis of the appearance of time has been accepted as good and true even by those who firmly deny the end conclusion that time is unreal. For instance, J. N. Findlay (1941) and A. Prior (1967) took McTaggart's phenomenological analysis as their point of departure in the development of modern tense logic.

McTaggart's characterisation of the appearance of time in terms of the A-series and B-series served to sharpen the contrast between the two emerging and rival views of time that we now know as the A-series and B-views of time. The assumption is that the A-view, in accepting the reality of tense, represent time as being like an A-series, and that the B-view, in rejecting the reality of tense, represent time as being like a B-series.

McTaggart's two objections to the conception of time as forming an A-series and a B-series remain central challenges for contemporary theories of time. Specifically, the A-theory faces the problem of potential contradiction, while the B-theory is often criticized for its difficulty in accounting for change.

The controversy about McTaggart's argument for the unreality of time continues unabated.

== Editions ==
- J. M. E. McTaggart (1908). "The Unreality of Time". Mind 17: 457–73.
- J. M. E. McTaggart (1927). The Nature of Existence (Volume 2). Cambridge: Cambridge University Press.

== See also ==
- Julian Barbour, a scholar who has also argued about the unreality of time
- McTaggartian change
- Philosophy of space and time
