= Opposite =

Linguistic concept

In lexical semantics, opposites are words lying in an inherently incompatible binary relationship. For example, something that is even entails that it is not odd. It is referred to as a 'binary' relationship because there are two members in a set of opposites. The relationship between opposites is known as opposition. A member of a pair of opposites can generally be determined by the question: "What is the opposite of X?"

The term antonym (and the related antonymy) is commonly taken to be synonymous with opposite, but antonym also has other more restricted meanings. Graded (or gradable) antonyms are word pairs whose meanings are opposite and which lie on a continuous spectrum (hot, cold). Complementary antonyms are word pairs whose meanings are opposite but whose meanings do not lie on a continuous spectrum (push, pull). Relational antonyms are word pairs where opposite makes sense only in the context of the relationship between the two meanings (teacher, pupil). These more restricted meanings may not apply in all scholarly contexts, with Lyons (1968, 1977) defining antonym to mean gradable antonyms, and Crystal (2003) warning that antonymy and antonym should be regarded with care.

== General discussion ==
Opposition is a semantic relation in which one word has a sense or meaning that negates or, in terms of a scale, is distant from a related word. Some words lack a lexical opposite due to an accidental gap in the language's lexicon. For instance, while the word "devout" has no direct opposite, it is easy to conceptualize a scale of devoutness, where "devout" lies at the positive end with a missing counterpart at the negative end. In certain cases, opposites can be formed with prefixes like "un-" or "non-," with varying levels of naturalness. For example, "undevout" is found in Webster's 1828 dictionary, while the prefix pattern of "non-person" could theoretically extend to "non-platypus."

Conversely, some words appear to be derived from a prefix suggesting opposition, yet the root term does not exist. An example is "inept," which seems to be "in-" + *"ept," although the word "ept" itself does not exist. Such words are known as unpaired words. Opposites may be viewed as a special type of incompatibility. Words that are incompatible create the following type of entailment (where X is a given word and Y is a different word incompatible with word X):

sentence A is X entails sentence A is not Y

An example of an incompatible pair of words is cat : dog:

It's a cat entails It's not a dog

This incompatibility is also found in the opposite pairs fast : slow and stationary : moving, as can be seen below:

It's fast entails It's not slow

It's stationary entails It's not moving

Cruse (2004) identifies some basic characteristics of opposites:

- binarity, the occurrence of opposites as a lexical pair
- inherentness, whether the relationship may be presumed implicitly
- patency, the quality of how obvious a pair is

Some planned languages abundantly use such devices to reduce vocabulary multiplication. Esperanto has mal- (compare bona = "good" and malbona = "bad"), Damin has kuri- (tjitjuu "small", kuritjitjuu "large") and Newspeak has un- (as in ungood, "bad").

Some classes of opposites include:

- antipodals, pairs of words which describe opposite ends of some axis, either literal (such as "left" and "right", "up" and "down", "east" and "west") or figurative or abstract (such as "first" and "last", "beginning" and "end", "entry" and "exit").
- disjoint opposites (or "incompatibles"), members of a set which are mutually exclusive but which leave a lexical gap unfilled, such as "red" and "blue", "one" and "ten", or "Monday" and "Friday".
- reversives, pairs of verbs which denote opposing processes, in which one is the reverse of the other. They are (or may be) performed by the same or similar subject(s) without requiring an object of the verbs, such as "rise" and "fall", "accelerate" and "decelerate", or "shrink" and "grow".
- converses (or relational opposites or relational antonyms), pairs in which one describes a relationship between two objects and the other describes the same relationship when the two objects are reversed, such as parent and child, teacher and student, or buy and sell.
- overlapping antonyms, a pair of comparatives in which one, but not the other, implies the positive:
  - An example is "better" and "worse". The sentence "x is better than y" does not imply that x is good, but "x is worse than y" implies that x is bad. Other examples are "faster" and "slower" ("fast" is implied but not "slow") and "dirtier" and "cleaner" ("dirty" is implied but not "clean"). The relationship between overlapping antonyms is often not inherent, but arises from the way they are interpreted most generally in a language. There is no inherent reason that an item be presumed to be bad when it is compared to another as being worse (it could be "less good"), but English speakers have combined the meaning semantically to it over the development of the language.

== Types of antonyms ==
An antonym is one of a pair of words with opposite meanings. Each word in the pair is the antithesis of the other. A word may have more than one antonym. There are three categories of antonyms identified by the nature of the relationship between the opposed meanings.

=== Gradable antonyms ===
A gradable antonym is one of a pair of words with opposite meanings where the two meanings lie on a continuous spectrum. Temperature is such a continuous spectrum so hot and cold, two meanings on opposite ends of the spectrum, are gradable antonyms. Other examples include: heavy : light, fat : skinny, dark : light, young : old, early : late, empty : full, dull : interesting.

=== Complementary antonyms ===
A complementary antonym, sometimes called a binary or contradictory antonym (Aarts, Chalker & Weiner 2014), is one of a pair of words with opposite meanings, where the two meanings do not lie on a continuous spectrum. There is no continuous spectrum between odd and even but they are opposite in meaning and are therefore complementary antonyms. Other examples include: mortal : immortal, exit : entrance, exhale : inhale, occupied : vacant.

=== Relational antonyms ===
A relational antonym is one of a pair of words that refer to a relationship from opposite points of view. There is no lexical opposite of teacher, but teacher and pupil are opposite within the context of their relationship. This makes them relational antonyms. Other examples include: husband : wife, doctor : patient, predator : prey, teach : learn, servant : master, come : go, parent : child.

== Auto-antonyms ==
An auto-antonym is a word that can have opposite meanings in different contexts or under separate definitions:

- enjoin (to prohibit, issue injunction; to order, command)
- fast (moving quickly; fixed firmly in place)
- cleave (to split; to adhere)
- sanction (punishment, prohibition; permission)
- stay (remain in a specific place, postpone; guide direction, movement)

== See also ==
- -onym
- Antithesis
- Litotes
- Property (philosophy)
- Semantic differential
- Thesaurus
- Opposite day

== Bibliography ==
- Aarts, Bas; Chalker, Sylvia; Weiner, Edmund (2014), The Oxford Dictionary of English Grammar, Oxford University Press, p. 80, ISBN 978-0-19-965823-7.
- Crystal, David. (2003). A dictionary of linguistics and phonetics (5th ed.). Malden, MA: Blackwell Publishing.
- Cruse, D. Alan. (1986). Lexical semantics. Cambridge: Cambridge University Press.
- Cruse, D. Alan. (1992). Antonymy revisited: Some thoughts on the relationship between words and concepts. In A. J. Lehrer & E. F. Kittay (Eds.), Frames, fields, and contrasts: New essays in semantic and lexical organization (pp. 289–306). Hillsdale, NJ: Lawrence Erlbaum Associates.
- Cruse, D. Alan. (2002). Paradigmatic relations of exclusion and opposition II: Reversivity. In D. A. Cruse, F. Hundsnurscher, M. Job, & P.R. Lutzeier (Eds.), Lexikologie: Ein internationales Handbuch zur Natur und Struktur von Wörtern und Wortschätzen: Lexicology: An international handbook on the nature and structure of words and vocabularies (Vol. 1, pp. 507–510). Berlin: De Gruyter.
- Cruse, D. Alan. (2004). Meaning in language: An introduction to semantics and pragmatics (2nd ed.). Oxford: Oxford University Press.
- Cruse, D. Alan; & Togia, Pagona. (1995). Towards a cognitive model of antonymy. Journal of Lexicology 1, 113-141.
- Davies, M. (2007) ‘The Attraction of Opposites: The ideological function of conventional and created oppositions in the construction of in-groups and out-groups in news texts’, in Jeffries, L., McIntyre, D. and Bousfield, D. (eds.) Stylistics and Social Cognition, pp. 79–100.
- Davies, M. (2013) Oppositions and Ideology in News Discourse. London: Bloomsbury Academic.
- Gambino, Stephen. The Subject Of Opposite. 33 types of Opposites. ISBN 979-8-8715-3854-8.
- Jeffries, L. (2009, forthcoming) Opposition in Discourse: The Construction of Oppositional Meaning. London: Continuum.
- Jones, S. (2002), Antonymy: A Corpus-based perspective. London and New York: Routledge.
- Lehrer, Adrienne J. (1985). Markedness and antonymy. Journal of Linguistics, 21, 397-421.
- Lehrer, Adrienne J. (2002). Paradigmatic relations of exclusion and opposition I: Gradable antonymy and complementarity. In D. A. Cruse, F. Hundsnurscher, M. Job, & P.R. Lutzeier (Eds.), Lexikologie: Ein internationales Handbuch zur Natur und Struktur von Wörtern und Wortschätzen: Lexicology: An international handbook on the nature and structure of words and vocabularies (Vol. 1, pp. 498–507). Berlin: De Gruyter.
- Lehrer, Adrienne J.; & Lehrer, Keith. (1982). Antonymy. Linguistics and Philosophy, 5, 483-501.
- Lyons, John. (1963). Structural semantics. Cambridge: Cambridge University Press.
- Lyons, John. (1968). Introduction to theoretical linguistics. Cambridge: Cambridge University Press.
- Lyons, John. (1977). Semantics (Vol. 1). Cambridge: Cambridge University Press.
- Mettinger, Arthur. (1994). Aspects of semantic opposition in English. Oxford: Clarendon Press.
- Murphy, M. Lynne. (2003). Semantic relations and the lexicon: Antonymy, synonymy, and other paradigms. Cambridge: Cambridge University Press.
- Palmer, F. R. (1976). Semantics: A new outline. Cambridge: Cambridge University Press.
- Saeed, John I. (2003). Semantics (2nd ed.). Malden, MA: Blackwell.
