= C. D. Broad =

English philosopher (1887–1971)

C. D. Broad FBA
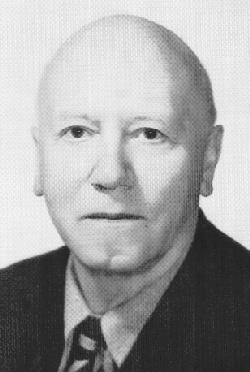
- Broad in 1959
- Born: Charlie Dunbar Broad; 30 December 1887; Harlesden, Middlesex, England
- Died: 11 March 1971 (aged 83); Cambridge, Cambridgeshire, England

Education
- Education: Trinity College, Cambridge
- Academic advisor: J. M. E. McTaggart

Philosophical work
- Era: 20th-century philosophy
- Region: Western philosophy
- School: Analytic; Critical perceptual realism
- Institutions: Trinity College, Cambridge
- Doctoral students: Knut Erik Tranøy
- Notable students: G. H. von Wright
- Main interests: Metaphysics, epistemology, ethics, philosophy of mind, logic
- Notable ideas: Growing block universe Rate of passage argument The "critical philosophy" and "speculative philosophy" distinction The "occurrent causation" and "non-occurrent causation" distinction

Charlie Dunbar Broad (30 December 1887 – 11 March 1971) was an English philosopher who worked on epistemology, history of philosophy, philosophy of science, and ethics, as well as the philosophical aspects of psychical research. He was known for his thorough and dispassionate examinations of arguments in such works as Scientific Thought (1923), The Mind and Its Place in Nature (1925), and Examination of McTaggart's Philosophy (2 vols., 1933–1938).

Broad's essay on "Determinism, Indeterminism, and Libertarianism" in Ethics and the History of Philosophy (1952) introduced the philosophical terms occurrent causation and non-occurrent causation, which became the basis for the contemporary distinction between "agent-causal" and "event-causal" in debates on libertarian free will.

== Biography ==
Broad was born in Harlesden, Middlesex. (Note: Harlesden was part of Middlesex until 1965; today it is part of the London Borough of Brent in Greater London.)

He was educated at Dulwich College from 1900 until 1906. He gained a scholarship in 1906 to study at Trinity College, Cambridge, graduating in 1910 with First-Class Honours, with distinction. He became a Fellow of Trinity College the following year.

=== Career ===
As his fellowship at Trinity College was a non-residential position, he was also able to accept a position as an assistant lecturer that he had applied for at St Andrews University, where he remained until 1920. That year, he was appointed professor at Bristol University, working there until 1923, when he returned to Trinity as a lecturer. From 1926 until 1931, he was a lecturer in 'moral science' at Cambridge University's Faculty of Philosophy.

Later at Cambridge, he was appointed in 1931 as 'Sidgwick Lecturer', a role he would keep until 1933, when he was appointed Knightbridge Professor of Moral Philosophy at the university, a position he held for twenty years (until 1953). In 1927 he gave the British Academy's Master-Mind Lecture, entitled "Sir Isaac Newton."

In addition, Broad was President of the Aristotelian Society from 1927 to 1928, and again from 1954 to 1955. He was also President of the Society for Psychical Research in 1935 and 1958.

=== Personal life ===
Broad was openly homosexual at a time when homosexual acts were illegal. In March 1958, Broad along with fellow philosophers A. J. Ayer and Bertrand Russell, writer J. B. Priestley and 27 others sent a letter to The Times which urged the acceptance of the Wolfenden Report's recommendation that homosexual acts should "no longer be a criminal offence."

== Theory ==
=== Psychical research ===
Broad argued that if research could demonstrate that psychic events occur, this would challenge philosophical theories of "basic limiting principles" in at least five ways:

1. Backward causation (i.e., the future affecting the past) is rejected by many philosophers, but would be shown to occur if, for example, people could predict the future.
2. One common argument against dualism (i.e., the belief that, while bodies are physical entities, minds are a different, non-physical sort of entity) is that physical and non-physical things cannot interact. However, this would be shown to be possible if people can move physical objects by thought (telekinesis).
3. Similarly, philosophers tend to be skeptical about claims that non-physical 'stuff' could interact with anything. This would also be challenged if minds are shown to be able to communicate with each other, as would be the case if mind-reading is possible.
4. Philosophers generally accept that we can only learn about the world through reason and perception. This belief would be challenged if people were able to psychically perceive events in other places.
5. Physicalist philosophers believe that there cannot be persons without bodies. If ghosts were shown to exist, this view would be challenged.

In his 1949 paper, Broad examined the implications of research by British parapsychologist Samuel Soal, who claimed to have discovered a subject, Basil Shackleton, capable of guessing the identity of Zener cards with odds of 'billions to one'. However, the validity of these findings was later questioned by Betty Markwick, following testimony from a colleague suggesting that Soal had manipulated both data and experiment methods.

=== Free will ===
In his essay "Determinism, Indeterminism, and Libertarianism", Broad argued for non-occurrent causation as "literally determined by the agent or self." The agent could be considered as a substance or continuant, and not by a total cause which contains as factors events in and dispositions of the agent. Thus, our efforts would be completely determined, but their causes would not be prior events. New series of events would then originate, which he called "continuants", which are essentially causa sui.

Peter van Inwagen says that Broad formulated an excellent version of what van Inwagen has called the "Consequence Argument" in defence of incompatibilism.

=== Metaphilosophy and science ===
Broad distinguished between critical philosophy and speculative philosophy. He described critical philosophy as analysing "unanalysed concepts in daily life and in science" and then "expos[ing] them to every objection that we can think of". While speculative philosophy's role is to "take over all aspects of human experience, to reflect upon them, and to try to think out a view of Reality as a whole which shall do justice to all of them".

One aspect of critical philosophy was the Principle of Exceptional Cases, whereby everyday concepts are considered in highly abnormal cases, so as to "clear up the meaning" of a concept.

Broad saw philosophy and science as supplemental to one another. Scientists who ignore philosophy expose themselves to a "danger to which the natural scientist is peculiarly liable. The extraordinary success of physics and chemistry within their own sphere tempts men to think that the world is simply a physico-chemical system". Whereas philosophers who ignore science are ignoring properties which are "very pervasive" and can shed light on things.

In terms of empirical propositions Broad distinguished between inspective empirical propositions which he defined "one which asserts of some particular existent with which the mind is acquainted at the time some property which the mind can notice by inspection to belong to it" and inferred empirical propositions which are "derived from a number of perceptual propositions either directly by pure inductive generalization, or indirectly by deduction from one or more inductive generalizations".

== Works ==
- 1914. Perception, Physics and Reality. An Enquiry into the Information that Physical Science can Supply about the Real. London: Cambridge University Press.
- 1923. Scientific Thought. New York: Harcourt, Brace and Co.
- 1925. The Mind and Its Place in Nature. London: Kegan.
- 1926. The Philosophy of Francis Bacon. Cambridge: Cambridge University Press.
- 1930. Five Types of Ethical Theory . New York: Harcourt, Brace and Co.
- 1931. War Thoughts in Peace Time. London: Humphrey Milford.
- 1933. Examination of McTaggart's Philosophy. Vol. 1. Cambridge University Press.
- 1934. Determinism, Indeterminism, and Libertarianism. Cambridge: Cambridge University Press.
- 1938. Examination of McTaggart's Philosophy. Vol. 2. Cambridge University Press.
- 1943. Berkeley's Argument about Material Substance. Annual Philosophical Lecture, Henriette Hertz Trust, British Academy
- 1952/2000. Ethics and the History of Philosophy. Routledge. ISBN 0-415-22530-2.
- 1953/2000. Religion, Philosophy and Psychic Research. Routledge. ISBN 0-415-22558-2.
- 1955. Human Personality and the Possibility of Its Survival. University of California Press.
- 1958. Personal Identity and Survival. London: Society for Psychical Research.
- 1962. Lectures on Psychical Research. Incorporating the Perrott Lectures given in Cambridge University in 1959 and 1960. New York: Humanities Press.
  - contains Saltmarsh's Investigation of Mrs Warren Elliott's Mediumship". Lectures on Psychical Research. Incorporating the Perrott Lectures given in Cambridge University in 1959 and 1960. New York: Humanities Press.
- 1968. Induction, Probability, and Causation. Selected Papers of C. D. Broad. Dordrecht: Reidel.
- 1971. Broad's Critical Essays in Moral Philosophy, New York: Humanities Press.
- 1975. Leibniz: An Introduction. Cambridge: Cambridge University Press. ISBN 0-521-20691-X
- 1976. Berkeley's Argument.. Haskell House Pub Ltd.
- 1978. Kant: An Introduction. (ed.) C. Lewy, Cambridge: Cambridge University Press. ISBN 0-521-21755-5
- 1985. Ethics. (ed.) C. Lewy, Dordrecht: Nijhoff.
- 2023. C. D. Broad: Key Unpublished Writings, (ed.) Joel Walmsley

== Sources ==
- Brown, Robert (1967): "Broad, Charlie Dunbar" in: Borchert, Donald M., ed. 2006. Encyclopedia of Philosophy, Volume 1 (2nd ed.). Farmington Hills, MI: Macmillan Reference. pp.695–700
