= Basic limiting principle =

A basic limiting principle (BLP) is a general principle that limits our explanations metaphysically or epistemologically, and which normally goes unquestioned or even unnoticed in our everyday or scientific thinking. The term was introduced by the philosopher C. D. Broad in his 1949 paper "The Relevance of Psychical research to Philosophy":

"There are certain limiting principles which we unhesitatingly take for granted as the framework within which all our practical activities and our scientific theories are confined. Some of these seem to be self-evident. Others are so overwhelmingly supported by all the empirical facts which fall within the range of ordinary experience and the scientific elaborations of it (including under this heading orthodox psychology) that it hardly enters our heads to question them. Let us call these Basic Limiting Principles."

Broad offers nine examples of B.L.P.s, including the principle that there can be no backward causation, that there can be no action at a distance, and that one cannot perceive physical events or material things directly, unmediated by sensations.
