= Moral universe =

In literature, a moral universe is the moral nature of the universe as a whole in relation to human life, or a specific moral code.

== Concept ==
A moral universe implies that we live in a spiritual universe that is somehow ordered by a higher power, by invisible feelings of good and bad, a 'cosmic order' reminiscent of the early Greeks that underpins and motivates our actions. Or a 'moral force' that means our actions must have definite effects which we carry with us. In this respect its meaning comes close to the Hindu concept of Karma.

Those who reject this idea tend to believe that the universe is just physical, has no spiritual component at all, that events are random and have no deeper meaning or purpose, and that there can be no consequences of any kind to our actions and thus that we live in an amoral or nihilistic universe, as in Nietzsche's "God is dead," aphorism. Such might be the position of "anti-moral free spirits-nihilists."

It is in Dostoyevsky's oft-quoted saying, "if God does not exist, then everything is permitted," that the notion of an amoral universe, and its implications, are explored. Similarly, some atheists, pagans and most Buddhists believe that we live in a moral universe (see Buddhist morality), but without the God aspect. The concept of a moral universe also implies that the good and bad events in our lives happen to us for a reason that life is good, and has a purpose, that human beings are basically good, that nature is good. In a moral universe, these meanings might be subtly discerned (see Hermeneutics), while it also offers the prospect of spiritual development, growth and enlightenment, whereas if we live in an amoral universe, these notions are utterly denied and in fact impossible (see Moral nihilism and Nihilism). Foucault, for example, is sometimes depicted as an amoral nihilist.

The concept of a moral universe seems also to underpin spirituality and forms the basis for kindness, compassion, altruism, and caring for others in human behaviour, including ecological activism and conservation. This is because it places a value on human life and living things that goes beyond what would seem suitable if we regarded people and living things merely as agglomerations of atoms essentially no different from any other unfeeling, non-sentient molecular structures such as rocks, soil, mountains or planets.

== Immanent justice ==
Belief in a moral universe often involves "deciding that negative experiences are punishment for prior misdeeds, even when plausible causal links are missing...(or) immanent justice." The term is also "used to describe the young child's tendency to affirm the existence of punishments that emanate from things themselves...(which) implies a causal relation between the behaviour and the outcome." In other words, it means "punishment for misdeeds (immanent justice)." Studies have repeatedly shown that "children use the belief in a just world in immanent justice judgements," to try to make sense of life events. It involves the belief that "combinations of good or bad prior behavior [are] followed by a lucky or unlucky event." Many people "believe they are living in a just world in which everybody gets what he deserves and deserves what he gets." One study has even "demonstrated more evidence of immanent justice responding among adults than among elementary school children." Arguably, immanent justice is a form of moral reasoning, and an aspect of the notion of a moral universe in which our actions are deemed to have consequences. Immanent justice is similar to the notion that 'what goes around comes around' or the proverb, 'we reap what we sow.' (See also panglossianism).

== Many moral universes ==
A moral universe can be a form of morality, or 'moral code,' associated with a specific place, a person, a group of people, an activity, a nation or a concept. The "characteristics of one's moral code determine how often and in what life situations inner conflict is aroused." This meaning attempts to explore variations in what are usually termed "traditional moral codes."

Examples of this second meaning include the following: "the moral universe of sport and physical activity," "accidents in a moral universe," the "moral universe of mystic river," "expanding our moral universe," "the moral universe of aggrieved Chinese workers," "the moral universe of Mr Chips," "the moral universe of William Bennett," "the moral universe of 'healthy' leisure time," "the moral universe of Edward Houston's Yard," and of parents who "fail to define a moral universe for their children."

This second meaning is sometimes confused with moral absolutism (found in most religions), which holds that there exists within society a universally accepted basis for our morality. The problem with this meaning is that morality is by no means commonly agreed, but varies in different countries and cultures such that what is considered right and proper or acceptable in some, is deemed harmful, improper or wicked in others. Examples include abortion, rape, contraception and homosexuality to name just a few. In other examples, revenge and crimes of passion are treated much more leniently in some countries compared to others. And this 'moral code' also varies in time. Therefore, this second meaning is sometimes rather loosely applied and is often more about moral relativism rather than a moral universe.

== Bibliography ==
- Tom Bentley, Daniel Stedman Jones, The Moral Universe, Demos, 2001
- Joshua Cohen, The Arc of the Moral Universe and Other Essays, Cambridge: Harvard University Press, 2010
- George W. King, The Moral Universe, Eaton & Mains, 1901
- Nancey C. Murphy, George Francis Rayner Ellis, On the Moral Nature of the Universe: Theology, Cosmology, and Ethics, Augsburg Fortress, 1996
- Michael W. Pelczar, The Moral Universe, Amherst College, 1993
- E. Plumridge & J. Chetwynd, The Moral Universe of Injecting Drug Users in the Era of AIDS: Sharing Injecting Equipment and the Protection of Moral Standing, AIDS Care, Volume 10, Issue 6, 1998, pages 723-733
- Shalom H. Schwartz, Universalism Values and the Inclusiveness of Our Moral Universe, Journal of Cross-Cultural Psychology, November 2007, vol. 38 no. 6, pp. 711–728
- Fulton J. Sheen, The Moral Universe: A Preface to Christian Living, Kessinger Publishing, 2010
- Yi-Fu Tuan, The City as a Moral Universe, Geographical Review, Vol. 78, No. 3 (Jul., 1988), pp. 316–324

== See also ==
- Just-world fallacy
- Hermeneutics
- Moral absolutism
- Moral relativism
- Moral arc of history
- Moral universalism
- New age
