= Subject and object (philosophy) =

Philosophy terms referring to an observer versus the thing observed

In philosophy, a subject is a being that exercises agency, undergoes conscious experiences, such as seeing and hearing, and is situated in relation to other things that exist outside itself; thus, a subject is any individual, person, or observer. Also in philosophy, an object is any of the things observed or experienced by a subject. Examples include physical objects such as chairs, clouds, the Moon, and potentially other beings (thus, from their own points of view: other subjects).

A simple common differentiation for subject and object is: an observer versus a thing that is observed. In certain cases involving personhood, subjects and objects can be considered interchangeable where each label is applied only from one or the other point of view. Subjects and objects are related to the philosophical distinction between subjectivity and objectivity: the existence of knowledge, ideas, or information either dependent upon a subject (subjectivity) or independent of any subject (objectivity).

== Etymology ==
In English the word object is derived from the Latin objectus (p.p. of obicere) with the meaning "to throw, or put before or against", from ob-, "against", and the root jacere, "to throw". Some other related English words include objectify (to reify), objective (a future reference), and objection (an expression of protest). Subject uses the same root, but with the prefix sub-, meaning "under".

Broadly construed, the word object names a maximally general category, whose members are eligible for being referred to, quantified over and thought of. Terms similar to the broad notion of object include thing, being, entity, item, existent, term, unit, and individual.

In ordinary language, one is inclined to call only a material object "object". In certain contexts, it may be socially inappropriate to apply the word object to animate beings, especially to human beings, while the words entity and being are more acceptable.

Some authors use object in contrast to property; that is to say, an object is an entity that is not a property. Objects differ from properties in that objects cannot be referred to by predicates. Some philosophers count abstract objects as objects, while others do not. Terms similar to such usage of object include substance, individual, and particular.

There are two definitions of object. The first definition holds that an object is an entity that fails to experience and that is not conscious. The second definition holds that an object is an entity experienced. The second definition differs from the first one in that the second definition allows for a subject to be an object at the same time.

One approach to defining an object is in terms of its properties and relations. Descriptions of all bodies, minds, and persons must be in terms of their properties and relations. For example, it seems that the only way to describe an apple is by describing its properties and how it is related to other things, such as its shape, size, composition, color, temperature, etc., while its relations may include "on the table", "in the room" and "being bigger than other apples". Metaphysical frameworks also differ in whether they consider objects existing independently of their properties and, if so, in what way. The notion of an object must address two problems: the change problems and the problems of substances. Two leading theories about objecthood are substance theory, wherein substances (objects) are distinct from their properties, and bundle theory, wherein objects are no more than bundles of their properties.

== In philosophy ==
=== Mahayana Buddhism ===
In the Mūlamadhyamakakārikā, the Indian philosopher Nagarjuna seizes upon the dichotomy between objects as collections of properties or as separate from those properties to demonstrate that both assertions fall apart under analysis. By uncovering this paradox he then provides a solution (pratītyasamutpāda – "dependent origination") that lies at the very root of Buddhist praxis. Although Pratītyasamutpāda is normally limited to caused objects, Nagarjuna extends his argument to objects in general by differentiating two distinct ideas – dependent designation and dependent origination. He proposes that all objects are dependent upon designation, and therefore any discussion regarding the nature of objects can only be made in light of the context. The validity of objects can only be established within those conventions that assert them.

=== Cartesian dualism ===
The formal separation between subject and object in the Western world corresponds to the dualistic framework, in the early modern philosophy of René Descartes, between thought and extension (in common language, mind and matter). Descartes believed that thought (subjectivity) was the essence of the mind, and that extension (the occupation of space) was the essence of matter. For modern philosophers like Descartes, consciousness is a state of cognition experienced by the subject—whose existence can never be doubted as its ability to doubt (and think) proves that it exists. On the other hand, he argues that the object(s) which a subject perceives may not have real or full existence or value, independent of that observing subject.

=== Substance theory ===
An attribute of an object is called a property if it can be experienced (e.g. its color, size, weight, smell, taste, and location). Objects manifest themselves through their properties. These manifestations seem to change in a regular and unified way, suggesting that something underlies the properties. The change problem asks what that underlying thing is. According to substance theory, the answer is a substance, that which stands for the change.

According to substance theory, because substances are only experienced through their properties a substance itself is never directly experienced. The problem of substance asks on what basis can one conclude the existence of a substance that cannot be seen or scientifically verified. According to David Hume's bundle theory, the answer is none; thus an object is merely its properties.

=== German idealism ===
Subject as a key-term in thinking about human consciousness began its career with the German idealists, in response to David Hume's radical skepticism. The idealists' starting point is Hume's conclusion that there is nothing to the self over and above a big, fleeting bundle of perceptions. The next step was to ask how this undifferentiated bundle comes to be experienced as a unity – as a single subject. Hume had offered the following proposal:

"...the imagination must by long custom acquire the same method of thinking, and run along the parts of space and time in conceiving its objects.

Kant, Hegel and their successors sought to flesh out the process by which the subject is constituted out of the flow of sense impressions. Hegel, for example, stated in his Preface to the Phenomenology of Spirit that a subject is constituted by "the process of reflectively mediating itself with itself."

Hegel begins his definition of the subject at a standpoint derived from Aristotelian physics: "the unmoved which is also self-moving" (Preface, para. 22). That is, what is not moved by an outside force, but which propels itself, has a prima facie case for subjectivity. Hegel's next step, however, is to identify this power to move, this unrest that is the subject, as pure negativity. Subjective self-motion, for Hegel, comes not from any pure or simple kernel of authentic individuality, but rather, it is

"...the bifurcation of the simple; it is the doubling which sets up opposition, and then again the negation of this indifferent diversity and of its anti-thesis" (Preface, para. 18).

The Hegelian subject's modus operandi is therefore cutting, splitting and introducing distinctions by injecting negation into the flow of sense-perceptions. Subjectivity is thus a kind of structural effect – what happens when Nature is diffused, refracted around a field of negativity and the "unity of the subject" for Hegel, is in fact a second-order effect, a "negation of negation". The subject experiences itself as a unity only by purposively negating the very diversity it itself had produced. The Hegelian subject may therefore be characterized either as "self-restoring sameness" or else as "reflection in otherness within itself" (Preface, para. 18).

=== American pragmatism ===
Charles S. Peirce of the late-modern American philosophical school of pragmatism, defines the broad notion of an object as anything that we can think or talk about. In a general sense it is any entity: the pyramids, gods, Socrates, the nearest star system, the number seven, a disbelief in predestination, or the fear of cats.

=== 20th century onwards ===
==== Continental philosophy ====
The thinking of Karl Marx and Sigmund Freud provided a point of departure for questioning the notion of a unitary, autonomous Subject, which for many thinkers in the Continental tradition is seen as the foundation of the liberal theory of the social contract. These thinkers opened up the way for the deconstruction of the subject as a core-concept of metaphysics.

Freud's explorations of the unconscious mind added up to a wholesale indictment of Enlightenment notions of subjectivity.

Among the most radical re-thinkers of human self-consciousness was Martin Heidegger, whose concept of Dasein or "Being-there" displaces traditional notions of the personal subject altogether. With Heidegger, phenomenology tries to go beyond the classical dichotomy between subject and object, because they are linked by an inseparable and original relationship, in the sense that there can be no world without a subject, nor the subject without world.

Jacques Lacan, inspired by Heidegger and Ferdinand de Saussure, built on Freud's psychoanalytic model of the subject, in which the split subject is constituted by a double bind: alienated from jouissance when they leave the Real, enters into the Imaginary (during the mirror stage), and separates from the Other when they come into the realm of language, difference, and demand in the Symbolic or the Name of the Father.

Thinkers such as structural Marxist Louis Althusser and poststructuralist Michel Foucault theorize the subject as a social construction, the so-called "poststructuralist subject". According to Althusser, the "subject" is an ideological construction (more exactly, constructed by the "Ideological State Apparatuses"). One's subjectivity exists, "always-already" and is constituted through the process of interpellation. Ideology inaugurates one into being a subject, and every ideology is intended to maintain and glorify its idealized subject, as well as the metaphysical category of the subject itself (see antihumanism).

According to Foucault, it is the "effect" of power and "disciplines" (see Discipline and Punish: construction of the subject (subjectivation or subjectification, French: assujettissement) as student, soldier, "criminal", etc.)). Foucault believed it was possible to transform oneself; he used the word ethopoiein from the word ethos to describe the process. Subjectification was a central concept in Gilles Deleuze and Félix Guattari's work as well.

==== Analytic philosophy ====
Bertrand Russell updated the classical terminology with a term, the fact; "Everything that there is in the world I call a fact." Russell uses the term "fact" in two distinct senses. In 1918, facts are distinct from objects. "I want you to realize that when I speak of a fact I do not mean a particular existing thing, such as Socrates or the rain or the sun. Socrates himself does not render any statement true or false. You might be inclined to suppose that all by himself he would give truth to the statement 'Socrates existed', but as a matter of fact that is a mistake." But in 1919, he identified facts with objects. "I mean by 'fact' anything complex. If the world contains no simples, then whatever it contains is a fact; if it contains any simples, then facts are whatever it contains except simples... That Socrates was Greek, that he married Xantippe [sic], that he died of drinking the hemlock, are facts that all have something in common, namely, that they are 'about' Socrates, who is accordingly said to be a constituent of each of them."

Facts, or objects, are opposed to beliefs, which are "subjective" and may be errors on the part of the subject, the knower who is their source and who is certain of himself and little else. All doubt implies the possibility of error and therefore admits the distinction between subjectivity and objectivity. The knower is limited in ability to tell fact from belief, false from true objects and engages in reality testing, an activity that will result in more or less certainty regarding the reality of the object. According to Russell, "we need a description of the fact which would make a given belief true" where "Truth is a property of beliefs." Knowledge is "true beliefs".

In contemporary analytic philosophy, the issue of subject—and more specifically the "point of view" of the subject, or "subjectivity"—has received attention as one of the major intractable problems in philosophy of mind (a related issue being the mind–body problem). In the essay "What Is It Like to Be a Bat?", Thomas Nagel famously argued that explaining subjective experience—the "what it is like" to be something—is currently beyond the reach of scientific inquiry, because scientific understanding by definition requires an objective perspective, which, according to Nagel, is diametrically opposed to the subjective first-person point of view. Furthermore, one cannot have a definition of objectivity without being connected to subjectivity in the first place since they are mutual and interlocked.

In Nagel's book The View from Nowhere, he asks: "What kind of fact is it that I am Thomas Nagel?". Subjects have a perspective but each subject has a unique perspective and this seems to be a fact in Nagel's view from nowhere (i.e. the birds-eye view of the objective description in the universe). The Indian view of "Brahman" suggests that the ultimate and fundamental subject is existence itself, through which each of us as it were "looks out" as an aspect of a frozen and timeless everything, experienced subjectively due to our separated sensory and memory apparatuses. These additional features of subjective experience are often referred to as qualia (see Frank Cameron Jackson and Mary's room).

== In other disciplines ==
=== Physics ===
Limiting discussions of objecthood to the realm of physical objects may simplify them. However, defining physical objects in terms of fundamental particles (e.g. quarks) leaves open the question of what is the nature of a fundamental particle and thus asks what categories of being can be used to explain physical objects.

=== Semantics ===
Symbols represent objects; how they do so, the map–territory relation, is the basic problem of semantics.

== See also ==
- Abstract object theory
- Abstraction
- Binding problem
- Category theory
- Cognitive linguistics
- Concept
- Continuous predicate
- Ethics and meta-ethics
- Hypostasis (philosophy and religion)
- Hypostatic abstraction
- List of ethics topics
- Michel Foucault's critique of the subject and the oxymoron "historical subject"
- Neo-Kantianism
- Nonexistent object
- Noumenon and phenomenon
- Object-oriented ontology
- Observer (physics)
- Open individualism
- Paramatma
- Personhood theory
- Ship of Theseus
- Sign relation
- Soul
- Subject (grammar)
- Subjectivity and objectivity (philosophy)
- Swamp man – thought experiment in Donald Davidson's 1987 paper "Knowing One's Own Mind"
- Transcendental subject
- Vertiginous question

== Bibliography ==
- Butler, Judith (1987), Subjects of Desire: Hegelian Reflections in Twentieth-Century France, New York: Columbia University Press, ISBN 0-231-06450-0
- Alain de Libera, "When Did the Modern Subject Emerge?", American Catholic Philosophical Quarterly, Vol. 82, No. 2, 2008, pp. 181–220.
- Robert B. Pippin, The Persistence of Subjectivity. On the Kantian Aftermath, Cambridge: Cambridge University Press, 2005.
- Russell, Bertrand (1948). Human Knowledge Its Scope and Limits. New York: Simon and Schuster.
- Udo Thiel, The Early Modern Subject. Self-Consciousness and Personal Identity from Descartes to Hume, New York: Oxford University Press, 2011.
