= Udo Thiel =

German philosopher

- Born: 1954 (age 71–72)

Education
- Doctoral advisor: Hans Wagner

Philosophical work
- Era: 21st-century philosophy
- Region: Western philosophy
- Institutions: University of Graz
- Main interests: history of philosophy

Udo Thiel (born 19 September 1954) is a German Philosopher and Professor i. R. at the Department of Philosophy at the University of Graz, Austria. He studied philosophy at the Universities of Marburg, Bonn and Oxford. In 1982 he completed his doctorate under the supervision of Hans Wagner at the University of Bonn. Prior to his appointment as professor of the history of philosophy at the University of Graz in 2009, he held positions at the University of Sydney and the Australian National University in Canberra. Since November 2022 he has been a Visitor at the Department of Philosophy at the University of Bonn. His research focuses on seventeenth- and eighteenth-century epistemology, metaphysics and philosophy of mind. He is a member of the Editorial Board of Locke Studies. In 2013 Udo Thiel was elected a Corresponding Member of the Austrian Academy of Sciences (ÖAW). In 2014 he received the Styrian government Award (Forschungspreis) for his research in early modern philosophy.

== Selected publications ==
- Self and Sensibility: Essays in Eighteenth-Century Philosophy of Mind. Ed. by D. Hüning, S. Klingner, G. Motta u. G. Stiening, Berlin, Boston: De Gruyter, 2024.
- Selbstbewusstsein und Reflexion. Studien zur Philosophie des Geistes von Locke bis Kant. Ed. by D. Hüning, S. Klingner, G. Motta u. G. Stiening, Berlin, Boston: De Gruyter 2024, XIII, 343 pp.
- “Ernst Cassirer’s Die Philosophie der Aufklärung or: Was there an Enlightenment?”, in Aufklärung 35 (2023), 27-75.
- (Ed., with G. Motta and D. Schulting), Kant's Transcendental Deduction and the Theory of Apperception. New Interpretations. Berlin, Boston: De Gruyter 2022, XIV, 648 pp.
- (Ed., with Giuseppe Motta), Immanuel Kant: Die Einheit des Bewusstseins. Berlin, Boston: De Gruyter 2017, VI, 284 pp.
- The Early Modern Subject: Self-Consciousness and Personal Identity from Descartes to Hume. Oxford: Oxford University Press 2011, xiv, 484 pp. 2nd Edition (Paperback) 2014, xvi, 484 pp.
- (Ed., with Gideon Stiening), Johann Nikolaus Tetens (1736-1807). Philosophie in der Tradition des europäischen Empirismus. Berlin, Boston: De Gruyter, 2014, 434 pp.
- (Ed.), Locke: Epistemology and Metaphysics. Aldershot: Ashgate-Dartmouth 2002, XXII, 525 pp.
- (Ed.), Philosophical Writings of Thomas Cooper. 3 vols. Bristol: Thoemmes 2001.
- (Ed.), John Locke: Essay über den menschlichen Verstand. Berlin: Akademie Verlag (Klassiker auslegen, vol. 6) 1997, VII, 302 pp. Second Edition 2008.
- John Locke. Reinbek/Hamburg: Rowohlt 1990, 158 pp. (Rowohlts Monographien, vol. 450). Second Edition 2000.
- Lockes Theorie der Personalen Identität. Bonn: Bouvier 1983, 216 pp. Second Edition 1991.

== Festschrift ==
Rudolf Meer, Giuseppe Motta and Gideon Stiening (eds.), Konzepte der Einbildungskraft in der Philosophie, den Wissenschaften und den Künsten des 18. Jahrhunderts. Festschrift zum 65. Geburtstag von Udo Thiel. Berlin, Boston: De Gruyter 2019, XX, 509 pp.
