= Converse (semantics) =

Pairs of words that refer to a relationship from opposite points of view

In linguistics, converses or relational antonyms are pairs of words that refer to a relationship from opposite points of view, such as parent/child or borrow/lend. The relationship between such words is called a converse relation. Converses can be understood as a pair of words where one word implies a relationship between two objects, while the other implies the existence of the same relationship when the objects are reversed. Converses are sometimes referred to as complementary antonyms because an "either/or" relationship is present between them. One exists only because the other exists.

== List of converse words ==
- Own and belong are relational opposites i.e. "A owns B" is the same as "B belongs to A."
- Win and lose i.e. if someone wins, someone must lose.
- Fraction and whole i.e. if there is a fraction, there must be a whole.
- Above and below
- Employer and employee
- Parent and child
- Teacher and student
- Buy and sell
- East and west
- Predator and prey
- Lend and borrow
- Offense and defense
- Slave and master

== See also ==
- Opposite (semantics)
