= Appearance and Reality =

1893 book by F. H. Bradley

- Title page
- Author: Francis Herbert Bradley
- Language: English
- Subject: Metaphysics
- Published: 1893
- Publication place: United Kingdom
- Media type: Print
- ISBN: 978-1402187636
- Text: Appearance and Reality at Wikisource

Appearance and Reality (1893; second edition 1897) is a book by the English philosopher Francis Herbert Bradley, in which the author, influenced by G. W .F Hegel, argues that things like qualities and relations, space and time, matter and motion, selves and bodies, and activity and change, are all contradictory and unreal appearances. Bradley goes on to describe the ultimate reality to which these appearances belong; and he calls this reality the Absolute. It is the main statement of Bradley's metaphysics and is considered his most important book.

== Overview and Reception ==
Appearance and Reality is considered Bradley's most important book. According to Ronald W. Clark, its publication helped to "wrest the philosophical initiative from the Continent." In 1894, the book was reviewed by J. M. E. McTaggart in Revue de métaphysique et de morale and Josiah Royce in The Philosophical Review. The book was an early influence on Bertrand Russell, encouraging him to question contemporary dogmas and beliefs. Russell recalled that Appearance and Reality had a profound appeal not only to him but to most of his contemporaries, and that the philosopher George Stout had stated that Bradley "had done as much as is humanly possible in ontology." While Russell later rejected Bradley's views, he continued to regard Appearance and Reality with "the greatest respect".

The philosopher Richard Wollheim comments that the second edition of Appearance and Reality contains considerable new material, and should be consulted in preference to the original edition. According to the British philosopher Timothy Sprigge, some of Bradley's arguments are famous. Sprigge suggests that Bradley's absolute idealism in some respects received a better presentation in Bradley's subsequent work Essays on Truth and Reality (1914) than in Appearance and Reality. Thomas Mautner comments that Bradley's "bold metaphysics" is presented with "pugnacious verve".
