= Fragmentalism =

Philosophical concept

Fragmentalism is a view that holds that the world consists of individual and independent objects. The term contends that the world is indeed composed of separable parts, and that it is chiefly knowable through the study of these component parts, rather than through wholes. It therefore stands opposed to holistic interpretations of phenomena.

"The Fragmentalists carved the universe up into smaller and smaller pieces until they reached such a fine level of subdivision that they could no longer observe the pieces directly." (Stewart & Cohen, p.198) "As the tale of the Fragmentalists demonstrates, reductionist science usually looks for a mathematical equation, formula, or process that describes general features of the universe." (Stewart & Cohen, p.200)

Fragmentalism has also been defined as the notion that knowledge is a growing collection of substantiated facts or "nuggets of truth." Anti-realists use the term fragmentalism in arguments that the world does not exist of separable entities, instead consisting of wholes. For example, advocates of this position declare that:

The linear deterministic approach to nature and technology promoted a fragmented perception of reality, and a loss of the ability to foresee, to adequately evaluate, in all their complexity, global crises in ecology, civilization and education.

This term is usually applied to reductionist modes of thought, frequently with the related pejorative term of scientism. This usage is popular amongst some ecological activists:

There is a need now to move away from scientism and the ideology of cause-and-effect determinism toward a radical empiricism, such as William James proposed, as an epistemology of science.

These perspectives are not new and in the early twentieth century, William James noted that rationalist science emphasized what he termed fragmentation and disconnection. Such anti-realist rhetoric also underpins many criticisms of the scientific method:

The scientific method only acknowledges monophasic consciousness. The method is a specialized system that focuses on studying small and distinctive parts in isolation, which results in fragmented knowledge.

An alternative usage of this term is in cognitive psychology. Here, George Kelly developed "constructive alternativism" as a form of personal construct psychology, this provided an alternative to what he saw as "accumulative fragmentalism". In this theory, knowledge is seen as the construction of successful mental models of the exterior world, rather than the accumulation of independent "nuggets of truth".

The term also has ancillary uses in education, in design theory, and environmentalism, as well as in healthcare and business management.

The term has been used in politics, in anthropology, in international development and in ecological economics. The term has also been used in Cultural Studies and in history

== See also ==
- Holistic science
- Antireductionism
- Antiscience
- Reductionism
