= Evidential existentiality =

The principle of evidential existentiality in philosophy is a principle that explains and gives value to the existence of entities. The principle states that the reality of an entity's existence gives greater value to prove its existence than would be given through any outward studies. The principle has become a backbone of the God argument, stating that because God is a self-evident entity, His existence can only be shared by humans, thus proof of God is unnecessary and moot. It appears that the existence is primarily evident to the self only. The God or Supreme self is perceivable to the self. So evidentially self perception is followed by God perception and so on.
