= Timothy Sprigge =

British idealist philosopher (1932–2007)

- Born: 14 January 1932; London, England, UK
- Died: 11 July 2007 (aged 75); Lewes, Sussex (now East Sussex), England, UK

Education
- Education: Gonville and Caius College, Cambridge

Philosophical work
- Era: Contemporary philosophy
- Region: Western philosophy
- School: British idealism
- Notable works: The Vindication of Absolute Idealism (1984)

Timothy Lauro Squire Sprigge (14 January 1932 – 11 July 2007), usually cited as T. L. S. Sprigge, was a British idealist philosopher who spent the latter portion of his career at the University of Edinburgh, where he was professor of logic and metaphysics, and latterly an emeritus fellow.

== Biography ==
Sprigge was educated at the Dragon School, Oxford, and Bryanston School in Dorset. He studied English at Gonville and Caius College, Cambridge (1952–1955), then switched to philosophy, completing his PhD under A. J. Ayer. He taught philosophy at University College London and Sussex University before becoming Regius Professor of Logic and Metaphysics at the University of Edinburgh.

Long concerned with the nature of experience and the relationship between mind and reality, Sprigge was the philosopher who first posed the question made famous by Thomas Nagel: "What is it like to be a bat?" Throughout his career he argued that physicalism or materialism is not only false, but has contributed to a distortion of our moral sense. The failure to respect the rights of human beings and non-human animals is therefore largely a metaphysical error of failing to grasp the true reality of the first person, subjective perspective of consciousness, or sentience. The practice of vivisection, which gained wide acceptance with Descartes's view of animals as machines, would be an example of this failure. He was an advocate of animal rights and defended an environmental ethic.

The author of The Vindication of Absolute Idealism (1984), Sprigge defended a panpsychist version of absolute idealism, according to which reality consists of bits of experience combined into a certain kind of coherent whole. His work presents several new arguments in favor of the plausibility of such an account. He also defended a version of determinism in which all moments of time are intrinsically present and only relatively past or future. Time is unreal, he argued. What we experience as temporal transition is an illusion. Though a skeptic of traditional theism, Sprigge considered himself a believer in an impersonal God. He would eventually become a Unitarian. In his last book, The God of Metaphysics (2006), he argued for the existence of a "God of Philosophers" worthy of worship. Sprigge's metaphysics is a creative synthesis of Spinoza, F. H. Bradley, William James, George Santayana and Alfred North Whitehead. Because of his metaphysical monism, panpsychism and rigid determinism, he has been referred to as "Spinoza reincarnated in the twentieth century".

A Festschrift for Sprigge appeared on the day he died, Consciousness, Reality and Value: Essays in Honour of T. L. S. Sprigge (Ontos Verlag).

He was president of the Aristotelian Society from 1991 to 1992 and Fellow of the Royal Society of Edinburgh.

The Timothy Sprigge Room at the Institute for Advanced Studies in the Humanities at the University of Edinburgh contains Sprigge's library. The Sprigge Archive is located at the Edinburgh University Library.

== Works ==
- The Correspondence of Jeremy Bentham (1968)
- Facts, Words and Beliefs. International Library of Philosophy and Scientific Method (1970)
- Santayana: An examination of his philosophy (The Arguments of the philosophers) (1974)
- The Vindication of Absolute Idealism (1984)
- Theories of Existence (1985)
- The Rational Foundation of Ethics (1988)
- The significance of Spinoza's determinism (Mededelingen vanwege het Spinozahuis) (1989)
- James and Bradley: American Truth and British Reality (1994)
- The God of Metaphysics (2006)
- The Phenomenology of Thought ed by. L. McHenry (unfinished) (2009)
- The Importance of Subjectivity: Selected Essays in Metaphysics and Ethics ed by. L. McHenry (2011)
