= List of philosophical problems =

This is a list of some of the major problems in philosophy.

== Philosophy of language ==
=== Counterfactuals ===
A statement is a conditional statement with a false antecedent. For example, the statement "If Joseph Swan had not invented the modern incandescent light bulb, then someone else would have invented it anyway" is a counterfactual, because, in fact, Joseph Swan invented the modern incandescent light bulb. The most immediate task concerning counterfactuals is that of explaining their truth-conditions. As a start, one might assert that background information is assumed when stating and interpreting counterfactual conditionals and that this background information is just every true statement about the world as it is (pre-counterfactual). In the case of the Swan statement, we have certain trends in the history of technology, the utility of artificial light, the discovery of electricity, and so on. We quickly encounter an error with this initial account: among the true statements will be "Joseph Swan did invent the modern incandescent light bulb." From the conjunction of this statement (call it "S") and the antecedent of the counterfactual ("¬S"), we can derive any conclusion, and we have the unwelcome result that any statement follows from any counterfactual (see the principle of explosion). Nelson Goodman takes up this and related issues in his seminal Fact, Fiction, and Forecast; and David Lewis's influential articulation of possible world theory is popularly applied in efforts to solve it.

== Epistemology ==
=== Gettier problem ===
Plato suggests, in his Theaetetus (210a) and Meno (97a–98b), that "knowledge" may be defined as justified true belief. For over two millennia, this definition of knowledge was accepted by subsequent philosophers. An item of information's justifiability, truth, and belief were seen as the necessary and sufficient conditions for knowledge.

However, in 1963, Edmund Gettier published an article in the journal Analysis, a peer-reviewed academic journal of philosophy, entitled "Is Justified True Belief Knowledge?" which offered instances of justified true belief that do not conform to the generally understood meaning of "knowledge." Gettier's examples hinged on instances of epistemic luck: cases where a person appears to have sound evidence for a proposition, and that proposition is in fact true, but the apparent evidence is not causally related to the proposition's truth.

In response to Gettier's article, numerous philosophers have offered modified criteria for "knowledge." There is no general consensus to adopt any of the modified definitions yet proposed. Finally, if infallibilism is true, that would seem to definitively solve the Gettier problem for good. Infallibilism states that knowledge requires certainty, such that, certainty is what serves to bridge the gap so that we arrive at knowledge, which means we would have an adequate definition of knowledge. However, infallibilism is rejected by the overwhelming majority of philosophers/epistemologists.

=== Problem of the criterion ===
Overlooking for a moment the complications posed by Gettier problems, philosophy has essentially continued to operate on the principle that knowledge is justified true belief. The obvious question that this definition entails is how one can know whether one's justification is sound. One must therefore provide a justification for the justification. That justification itself requires justification, and the questioning continues interminably.

The conclusion is that no one can truly have knowledge of anything, since it is, due to this infinite regression, impossible to satisfy the justification element. In practice, this has caused little concern to philosophers, since the demarcation between a reasonably exhaustive investigation and superfluous investigation is usually clear.

Others argue for forms of coherentist systems, e.g. Susan Haack. Recent work by Peter D. Klein views knowledge as essentially defeasible. Therefore, an infinite regress is unproblematic, since any known fact may be overthrown on sufficiently in-depth investigation.

=== Problem of induction ===
Scottish philosopher David Hume first formulated the problem of induction, arguing there is no non-circular way to justify inductive reasoning. That is, reasoning based on inferring conclusions from specific observations. This is a problem because everybody uses induction on a day-to-day basis, e.g. "The sun rose in the east today therefore the sun will rise in the east tomorrow."

Karl Popper argued that science and ordinary life do not use induction, and induction is in fact a myth. Instead, knowledge is created by conjecture and criticism. The main role of observations and experiments in science, he argued, is in attempts to criticize and refute existing theories.

=== Molyneux problem ===
The Molyneux problem dates back to the following question posed by William Molyneux to John Locke in the 17th century: if a man born blind, and able to distinguish by touch between a cube and a globe, were made to see, could he now tell by sight which was the cube and which the globe, before he touched them? The problem raises fundamental issues in epistemology and the philosophy of mind, and was widely discussed after Locke included it in the second edition of his Essay Concerning Human Understanding.

A similar problem was also addressed earlier in the 12th century by Ibn Tufail (Abubacer), in his philosophical novel, Hayy ibn Yaqdhan (Philosophus Autodidactus). His version of the problem, however, dealt mainly with colors rather than shapes.

The 2011 Held et al. studies of human subjects who gained vision after extended congenital blindness showed that subjects were unable to immediately link objects known by touch to their visual appearance. Instead, they gradually developed this ability over days or months. The ability to associate tactile and visual information requires learning and experience. Another study suggests, however, that the results might have been due to a visual deficit, rather than a true lack of intermodal neural connections.

=== Münchhausen trilemma ===
In epistemology, the Münchhausen trilemma is a thought experiment intended to demonstrate the theoretical impossibility of proving any truth, even in the fields of logic and mathematics, without appealing to accepted assumptions. If it is asked how any given proposition is known to be true, proof may be provided. The Münchhausen trilemma is that there are only three ways of completing a proof:

- The circular argument, in which the proof of some proposition presupposes the truth of that very proposition
- The regressive argument, in which each proof requires a further proof, ad infinitum
- The dogmatic argument, which rests on accepted precepts which are merely asserted rather than defended

The trilemma, then, is the decision among the three equally unsatisfying options. Karl Popper's suggestion was to accept the trilemma as unsolvable and work with knowledge by way of conjecture and criticism.

== Metaphysics ==
=== Why there is something rather than nothing ===
The question about why is there anything at all instead of nothing has been raised or commented on by philosophers including Gottfried Wilhelm Leibniz, Martin Heidegger, and Ludwig Wittgenstein – who called it the fundamental question of metaphysics. The question is general, rather than concerning the existence of anything specific such as the universe/s, the Big Bang, mathematical laws, physical laws, time, consciousness or God.

=== Problem of universals ===
The problem of universals refers to the question of whether properties exist, and if so, what they are. Properties are qualities or relations or names that two or more entities have in common. The various kinds of properties, such as qualities and relations, are referred to as universals. For instance, one can imagine three cup holders on a table that have in common the quality of being circular or exemplifying circularity, or bear the same name, "circular cup" or two daughters that have in common being the female offsprings of Frank. There are many such properties, such as being human, red, male or female, liquid, big or small, taller than, father of, etc. While philosophers agree that human beings talk and think about properties, they disagree on whether these universals exist in reality or merely in thought, speech and sight.

=== Principle of individuation ===
Related to the problem of universals, the principle of individuation is what individuates universals.

=== Sorites paradox ===
Otherwise known as the "paradox of the heap", the question regards how one defines a "thing." Is a bale of hay still a bale of hay if you remove one straw? If so, is it still a bale of hay if you remove another straw? If you continue this way, you will eventually deplete the entire bale of hay, and the question is: at what point is it no longer a bale of hay? While this may initially seem like a superficial problem, it penetrates to fundamental issues regarding how we define objects. This is similar to Theseus' paradox and the continuum fallacy.

=== Theseus paradox ===
Also known as the ship of Theseus, this is a classical paradox on the first branch of metaphysics, ontology (philosophy of existence and identity). The paradox runs thus: There used to be the great ship of Theseus which was made out of, say, 100 parts. Each part has a single corresponding replacement part in the ship's port. Over the centuries, each part is replaced individually as it breaks, and eventually, not a single original part of the ship remains. Is this new ship the ship of Theseus or not?

If yes, consider this: the broken original parts are repaired and re-assembled. Is this the ship of Theseus or not? If not, let us name the new ship "The Argo". At what point did the crew of the Theseus become the crew of the Argo? And what ship is sailing when 50 of the parts have been replaced? If both the ships trade a single piece, are they still the same ships?

This paradox is a minor variation of the Sorites Paradox above, and has many variations itself. Both sides of the paradox have convincing arguments and counter-arguments, though no one is close to proving it completely.

=== Material implication ===
People have a rather clear idea of what if-then means. In formal logic however, material implication defines if-then, which is not consistent with the common understanding of conditionals. In formal logic, the statement "If today is Saturday, then 1+1=2" is true. However, '1+1=2' is true regardless of the content of the antecedent; a causal or meaningful relation is not required. The statement as a whole must be true, because 1+1=2 cannot be false. (If it could, then on a given Saturday, so could the statement). Formal logic has shown itself extremely useful in formalizing argumentation, philosophical reasoning, and mathematics. The discrepancy between material implication and the general conception of conditionals however is a topic of intense investigation: whether it is an inadequacy in formal logic, an ambiguity of ordinary language, or as championed by H. P. Grice, that no discrepancy exists.

== Philosophy of mind ==
=== Mind–body problem ===
The mind–body problem is the problem of determining the relationship between the human body and the human mind. Philosophical positions on this question are generally predicated on either a reduction of one to the other, or a belief in the discrete coexistence of both. This problem is usually exemplified by Descartes, who championed a dualistic picture. The problem therein is to establish how the mind and body communicate in a dualistic framework, and how causality occurs between the two. Neurobiology and emergence have further complicated the problem by allowing the material functions of the mind to be a representation of some further aspect emerging from the mechanistic properties of the brain. The brain essentially stops generating conscious thought during deep sleep; the ability to restore such a pattern remains a mystery to science and is a subject of current research (see also neurophilosophy).

=== Qualia ===
The question hinges on whether color is a product of the mind or an inherent property of objects. Whilst most philosophers will agree that color assignment corresponds to spectra of light frequencies, it is not at all clear whether the particular psychological phenomena of color are imposed on these visual signals by the mind, or whether such qualia are somehow naturally associated with their noumena. Another way to look at this question is to assume two people ("Fred" and "George" for the sake of convenience) see colors differently. That is, when Fred sees the sky, his mind interprets this light signal as blue. He calls the sky "blue." However, when George sees the sky, his mind assigns green to that light frequency. If Fred were able to step into George's mind, he would be amazed that George saw green skies. However, George has learned to associate the word "blue" with what his mind sees as green, and so he calls the sky "blue", because for him the color green has the name "blue." The question is whether blue must be blue for all people, or whether the perception of that particular color is assigned by the mind.

This extends to all areas of the physical reality, where the outside world we perceive is merely a representation of what is impressed upon the senses. The objects we see are in truth wave-emitting (or reflecting) objects which the brain shows to the conscious self in various forms and colors. Whether the colors and forms experienced perfectly match between person to person, may never be known. That people can communicate accurately shows that the order and proportionality in which experience is interpreted is generally reliable. Thus one's reality is, at least, compatible to another person's in terms of structure and ratio.

=== Hard problem of consciousness ===
The hard problem of consciousness is the question of what consciousness is and why we have consciousness as opposed to being philosophical zombies. The adjective "hard" is to contrast with the "easy" consciousness problems, which seek to explain the mechanisms of consciousness ("why" as compared with "how", or final cause versus efficient cause). The hard problem of consciousness is questioning whether all beings undergo an experience of consciousness rather than questioning the neurological makeup of beings. Ned Block believes that there also exists a "Harder Problem of Consciousness", due to the possibility of different physical and functional neurological systems potentially having phenomenal overlap.

=== Cognition and AI ===
The philosophy of artificial intelligence and cognition examines the nature and possibility of machine intelligence and consciousness. It intersects with cognitive science, philosophy of mind, and computer science. Major debates concern whether artificial systems can possess genuine understanding, how intelligence should be operationally defined, and whether computational processes can replicate or instantiate mental states. The main question this field confronts is whether an AI is capable of intentionality, or "the capacity to have a mental representation of or about a thing or a state of affairs". The potential answers to these questions have changed as artificial intelligence has advanced much throughout the past decade alone.

Artificial intelligence in image recognition began as training the program to search for specific features and separate images into categories. More recently, AI has been developed to "learn" via artificial machine learning (AML), which receives visual data from various photos and then reconstructs an idea of what something looks like based on those original images. If the program itself determines its own idea of what something looks like due to the data it is given, one must consider if this is emblematic of intelligence.

The first explorations into these questions began with the Turing Test. Proposed by mathematician and computer scientist Alan Turing, it is often cited as a prototypical test of intelligence. It involves a conversation between a sentient being and a machine, and if the being can't tell they aren't talking to a human, then the machine is considered intelligent. One issue that critics have with this test is that it "can never provide a sufficient ground for machine mindedness", only that it can appear to do so. A well-trained machine could theoretically "parrot" its way through the test by repeating the "correct" answers it has learned. This raises the corollary question of how to differentiate between a well-trained mimic from a sentient entity.

One way to examine this distinction is to examine the philosophy of mind, and how it relates to an artificial computing system. Putnam's theory of functionalism uses the example of a Turing machine to describe the functional organization of the brain. Specifically, it discusses how in a machine functional states are defined by the inputs, outputs and other states in the system. Comparing this to the brain, the similarity of function is seen in how "mental states are individuated by the way they affect and are affected by other mental states, stimuli and behavior". In turn, this theory led to his conclusion that "everything is a Probabilistic Automaton" or a kind of Turing machine. However, there is the question that if everything is computational at some level, then functionalism may be unable to tell us what is special about the cognition of the human mind.

As a direct counterargument to the Turing Test and philosophy of mind argument, the Chinese room thought experiment was developed by philosopher John Searle. It compares an artificial intelligence to an individual in a room, using a book of Chinese translations to communicate with Chinese speakers outside. The native speakers receive the response and believe they are speaking to someone who truly understands the language. However, Searle argues that this form of intelligence that a machine portrays is not based on intentionality or understanding, but the formal manipulation of data to produce meaning to those receiving the information. Hence, the machine does not display any real intelligence in both its processing and response production.

Critics of this experiment contend that if a machine lacks true intelligence, then there is still the question of how or why a program has some other means of generating intelligent responses that still produce meaning to onlookers. There is also the possibility of whether the eventual memorization of the book over time results in the AI actually learning Chinese.

Another dimension of this philosophical argument is the cognitive biases of AI, which addresses such problems as the existence of moral personhood of AIs and the question of making machines that behave ethically towards humans and others. Research suggests that biases in AI systems may not simply be artifacts from the data used to train them but can stem from the structural features of the models used to generate information. As such, artificial intelligence is capable of displaying biases like the Halo effect or Anchoring effect when taking on an artificial persona, though these effects are often amplified as "caricatures" of real human behavior. This could be a result of the machine's tendency to reinforce biases without the ability to self-reflect and moderate that behavior as a human could.

The difficulties in analyzing the sources of these biases stem from the "black box" problem, in which developers and researchers cannot always determine why exactly artificial intelligence forms certain conclusions or responses from data. These debates bring into question whether AI should be given complete freedom to interact with humans if there are issues in understanding where its intelligence comes from. Additionally, analyzing the program's understanding of morality, consequences and influence of its own behavior before it acts is difficult to define. Ultimately, this philosophical field will continue to develop as the capabilities of artificial intelligence grow over time.

=== Personal identity ===
In philosophy, the problem of personal identity is concerned with how one is able to identify a single person over a time interval, dealing with such questions as, "What makes it true that a person at one time is the same thing as a person at another time?" or "What kinds of things are we persons?"

A question related to the problem of personal identity is Benj Hellie's vertiginous question. The vertiginous question asks why, of all the subjects of experience out there, this one—the one corresponding to the human being referred to as Benj Hellie—is the one whose experiences are live? (The reader is supposed to substitute their own case for Hellie's.) Hellie's argument is closely related to Caspar Hare's theories of egocentric presentism and perspectival realism, of which several other philosophers have written reviews. Similar questions are also asked repeatedly by J. J. Valberg in justifying his horizonal view of the self. Tim S. Roberts refers to the question of why a particular organism out of all the organisms that happen to exist happens to be you as the "Even Harder Problem of Consciousness".

The philosophical issues with personal identity have been extensively discussed by Thomas Nagel in his book The View from Nowhere. It contrasts passive and active points of view in how humanity interacts with the world, relying either on a subjective perspective that reflects a point of view or an objective perspective that takes a more detached perspective. Nagel describes the objective perspective as the "view from nowhere", one where the only valuable ideas are ones derived independently.

Open individualism is a view in the philosophy of self, according to which there exists only one numerically identical subject, who is everyone at all times, in the past, present and future. It is a theoretical solution to the question of personal identity, being contrasted with "Empty individualism", the view that personal identities correspond to a fixed pattern that instantaneously disappears with the passage of time, and "Closed individualism", the common view that personal identities are particular to subjects and yet survive over time.

Open individualism is related to the concept of anattā in Buddhist philosophy. In Buddhism, the term anattā (Pali: 𑀅𑀦𑀢𑁆𑀢𑀸) or anātman (Sanskrit: अनात्मन्) is the doctrine of "non-self" – that no unchanging, permanent self or essence can be found in any phenomenon. While often interpreted as a doctrine denying the existence of a self, anatman is more accurately described as a strategy to attain non-attachment by recognizing everything as impermanent, while staying silent on the ultimate existence of an unchanging essence. In contrast, dominant schools of Hinduism assert the existence of Ātman as pure awareness or witness-consciousness, "reify[ing] consciousness as an eternal self."

One thought experiment in the philosophy of personal identity is the teletransportation paradox. It deals with whether the concept of one's future self is a coherent concept. The thought experiment was formulated by Derek Parfit in his 1984 book Reasons and Persons. Derek Parfit and others consider a hypothetical "teletransporter", a machine that puts you to sleep, records your molecular composition, breaking you down into atoms, and relaying its recording to Mars at the speed of light. On Mars, another machine re-creates you (from local stores of carbon, hydrogen, and so on), each atom in exactly the same relative position. Parfit poses the question of whether or not the teletransporter is actually a method of travel, or if it simply kills and makes an exact replica of the user. Then the teleporter is upgraded. The teletransporter on Earth is modified to not destroy the person who enters it, but instead it can simply make infinite replicas, all of whom would claim to remember entering the teletransporter on Earth in the first place. Using thought experiments such as these, Parfit argues that any criteria we attempt to use to determine sameness of person will be lacking, because there is no further fact. What matters, to Parfit, is simply "Relation R", psychological connectedness, including memory, personality, and so on.

== Philosophy of mathematics ==
=== Mathematical objects ===
What are numbers, sets, groups, points, etc.? Are they real objects or are they simply relationships that necessarily exist in all structures? Although many disparate views exist regarding what a mathematical object is, the discussion may be roughly partitioned into two opposing schools of thought: platonism, which asserts that mathematical objects are real, and formalism, which asserts that mathematical objects are merely formal constructions. This dispute may be better understood when considering specific examples, such as the "continuum hypothesis". The continuum hypothesis has been proven independent of the ZF axioms of set theory, so within that system, the proposition can neither be proven true nor proven false. A formalist would therefore say that the continuum hypothesis is neither true nor false, unless you further refine the context of the question. A platonist, however, would assert that there either does or does not exist a transfinite set with a cardinality less than the continuum but greater than any countable set. So, regardless of whether it has been proven unprovable, the platonist would argue that an answer nonetheless does exist.

== Philosophy of science ==
=== Demarcation problem ===
'The problem of demarcation' is an expression introduced by Karl Popper to refer to 'the problem of finding a criterion which would enable us to distinguish between the empirical sciences on the one hand, and mathematics and logic as well as "metaphysical" systems on the other'. Popper attributes this problem to Kant. Although Popper mentions mathematics and logic, other writers focus on distinguishing science from metaphysics.

A prominent question in meta-philosophy is that of whether or not philosophical progress occurs and more so, whether such progress in philosophy is even possible. It has even been disputed, most notably by Ludwig Wittgenstein, whether genuine philosophical problems actually exist. The opposite has also been claimed, for example by Karl Popper, who held that such problems do exist, that they are solvable, and that he had actually found definite solutions to some of them. David Chalmers divides inquiry into philosophical progress in meta-philosophy into three questions. The Existence Question: is there progress in philosophy? The Comparison Question: is there as much progress in philosophy as in science? The Explanation Question: why isn't there more progress in philosophy?

=== Realism ===
Does a world independent of human beliefs and representations exist? Is such a world empirically accessible, or would such a world be forever beyond the bounds of human sense and hence unknowable? Can human activity and agency change the objective structure of the world? These questions continue to receive much attention in the philosophy of science. A clear "yes" to the first question is a hallmark of the scientific realism perspective. Philosophers such as Bas van Fraassen have important and interesting answers to the second question. In addition to the realism vs. empiricism axis of debate, there is a realism vs. social constructivism axis which heats many academic passions. With respect to the third question, Paul Boghossian's Fear of Knowledge: Against Relativism and Constructivism is a powerful critique of social constructivism, for instance. Ian Hacking's The Social Construction of What? constitutes a more moderate critique of constructivism, which usefully disambiguates confusing polysemy of the term "constructivism."

=== Relationship between science and religion ===
What is the relationship between science and religion? Philosophers like Paul Feyerabend, A. C. Grayling, and Alvin Plantinga have debated whether they are in conflict, incompatible, incommensurable, or independent.

== Philosophy of religion ==
Philosophy of religion encompasses attempts within metaphysics, epistemology, ethics, and other major philosophical fields to philosophically analyze concepts within religion, the nature of religion itself, and alternatives to religion.

=== Existence of God ===
A variety of arguments including forms of the contingency argument, ontological argument, and moral argument have been proposed by philosophers like Aristotle, Descartes, Leibniz, Gödel, and Aquinas for the existence of God throughout history. Arguments for God usually refer to some form of metaphysically or logically necessary maximally great being distinct from individual deities, although philosophers have also proposed different concepts of God. Wittgenstein and Kant, on the other hand, defended religious belief while doubting that rational arguments could prove God's existence. Philosophers have also considered objections to the existence of God like the problem of evil and divine hiddenness.

=== Nature of God ===
What is God like? Philosophers like John Stuart Mill and Aquinas addressed the question of what the nature of God is if God exists. Some of the key disagreements concern the doctrine of impassibility and the coherency of a maximally great being or properties like omnipotence.

=== Epistemology of religion ===
Can religious belief be justified? When? According to the Cambridge Dictionary of Philosophy, religious epistemology "investigates the epistemic status of propositional attitudes about religious claims." Philosophers like Kant, Kierkegaard, William James, and Alvin Plantinga have debated stances towards the epistemic status of religious belief like reformed epistemology, fideism, and evidentialism.

== Philosophy of sport ==
=== Most valuable player problem ===
The concept of the 'most valuable player' is discussed within the field of philosophy of sport. Philosophers Stephen Kershnar and Neil Feit argue that the concept of the MVP is a fundamentally vague concept, but yet valuable in that it promotes the active discussion of different types of excellence found within a specific sport and the weight to be assigned these types, thus leading to a gain for the discussants. Stephen Kershnar termed this vagueness the 'Most Valuable Player Problem'. He offered a solution to the problem but later recanted it, conceding that the problem remains unsolved.

== Ethics ==
=== Moral luck ===
The problem of moral luck is that some people are born into, live within, and experience circumstances that seem to change their moral culpability when all other factors remain the same.

For instance, a case of circumstantial moral luck: a poor person is born into a poor family, and has no other way to feed himself so he steals his food. Another person, born into a very wealthy family, does very little but has ample food and does not need to steal to get it. Should the poor person be more morally blameworthy than the rich person? After all, it is not this person's fault that they were born into such circumstances, but a matter of "luck".

A related case is resultant moral luck. For instance, two persons behave in a morally culpable way, such as driving carelessly, but end up producing unequal amounts of harm: two people drive while intoxicated, but one strikes a pedestrian and kills him, while the other does not. That one driver caused a death and the other did not is no part of the drivers' intentional actions; yet most observers would likely ascribe greater blame to the driver who killed (compare consequentialism and choice).

The fundamental question of moral luck is how our moral responsibility is changed by factors over which we have no control.

=== Moral knowledge ===
Are moral facts possible, what do they consist in, and how do we come to know them? Rightness and wrongness seem to be strange kinds of entities, and different from the usual properties of things in the world, such as wetness, redness, or solidity. Richmond Campbell has outlined these kinds of issues in his encyclopedia article "Moral Epistemology".

In particular, he considers three alternative explanations of moral facts as: theological, (supernatural, the commands of God); non-natural (based on intuitions); or simply natural properties (such as leading to pleasure or to happiness). There are cogent arguments against each of these alternative accounts, he claims, and there has not been any fourth alternative proposed. So the existence of moral knowledge and moral facts remains dubious and in need of further investigation. But moral knowledge supposedly already plays an important part in people's everyday thinking, in legal systems and criminal investigations.

== See also ==
- Thought experiment
- List of paradoxes
