= Why am I me? =

Philosophical question about personal identity

"Why am I me?" is a philosophical question that asks why, of all the subjects of experience, it is one in particular whose experiences are lived by each person. In other words: "Why am I me and not someone else?"

== Overview ==
Philosophers have used various terminology to describe the phenomenon of individuals existing as themselves and not as someone else. Herbert Spiegelberg has called it the "I-am-me experience", or the Ich-Erlebnis experience in German.

An abstract diagram depicting the "constellation" view with subjects represented as circles (○)

An abstract diagram depicting the "embedded" view, with the lived subject depicted as a black circle (●)

An abstract diagram depicting the world as "centered" around a specific individual

Benj Hellie has called it the vertiginous question and discussed various responses. A simple response is that this question reduces to "Why are Hellie's experiences lived from Hellie's perspective", which is trivial to answer. But Hellie argues, through a parable, that this response leaves something out. His parable describes two situations, one reflecting a broad global constellation view of the world and everyone's phenomenal features, and one describing an embedded view from the perspective of a single subject. The former seems to align better with the simple response above, but the latter seems to be a better description of consciousness.

The question may have a number of philosophical implications. Christian List argues that the existence of first-personal facts are evidence against physicalism, and against other third-personal metaphysical pictures, including standard versions of dualism. List also argues that the question implies a "quadrilemma" for theories of consciousness. He claims that at most three of the following metaphysical claims can be true: "first-person realism", "non-solipsism", "non-fragmentation", and "one world"—and thus one of the four must be rejected. List has proposed a model he calls the "many-worlds theory of consciousness" to account for the subjective nature of consciousness without lapsing into solipsism.

Some philosophers have argued that there is a connection between the nature of the self and the nature of time. Vincent Conitzer argues that the vertiginous question is related to A series and B series theories of time, and that arguments in favor of the A-theory of time are more effective as arguments for the combined position of both A-theory being true and the "I" being metaphysically privileged from other perspectives. Caspar Hare has made similar arguments with the theories of egocentric presentism and perspectival realism, of which several other philosophers have written reviews.

Thomas Nagel extensively discusses the question of personal identity in The View from Nowhere. He contrasts passive and active points of view in how humanity interacts with the world, relying either on a subjective perspective that reflects a point of view or an objective perspective that is more detached. Nagel calls the objective perspective the "view from nowhere", one where the only valuable ideas are ones derived independently.

In his book Anthropic Bias, Nick Bostrom discusses observation selection effects such as the self-sampling assumption and self-indication assumption as indexical reductionist reponses to the question.

David Lewis proposed a thought experiment in which there are two omniscient gods. The gods each live in different possible worlds, and know all propositional facts about their particular world. One god lives on top of the tallest mountain and throws manna, while the other lives on top of the coldest mountain and throws thunderbolts. Lewis argued that the gods would still be ignorant about which particular god they are, and that if they lack knowledge but not propositional knowledge, this implies the existence of non-propositional indexical facts about who the world is centered around.

Chuming Liang argues that the “first-person problem”—why experience is given from a particular perspective rather than another—has been misinterpreted through what he calls the “distribution model,” the idea that a special inner entity (s*) is assigned to a center of consciousness to make it “me.” He contends that this model fails because such an entity cannot fulfill its explanatory role: if it is experiential, it presupposes first-person givenness; if non-experiential, it cannot individuate a subject; if purely formal, it cannot distinguish centers; and if made fully explanatory, it becomes unfalsifiable. Liang instead proposes a non-distributive account in which first-personhood is not a private object but a non-substantial condition of appearance from within, reframing the problem as one of how experience arises from a local perspective rather than who possesses an inner self.

Other philosophers have discussed various other related ideas. J. J. Valberg asks similar questions in justifying his horizonal view of the self. Japanese philosopher Hitoshi Nagai has used the concept of first-person perspectives as a way to define the self as the "one who directly experiences the consciousness of oneself". It has also been argued that the self is an "idiomodific" concept.

== See also ==
- Centered world
- Further facts
- Indexicality
- Problem of mental causation
- Subjective idealism
- Metaphysical subjectivism
- Subjectivity and objectivity (philosophy)
- Type–token distinction
