= Philosophy of self =

Concept in philosophy

Philosophy of self examines the idea of the self at a conceptual level. It is often regarded as part of the broader philosophy of subjectivity.

Many different ideas on what constitutes self have been proposed, including the self being an activity, the self being independent of the senses, the bundle theory of the self, the self as a narrative center of gravity, and the self as a linguistic or social construct rather than a physical entity. The self (or its non-existence) is also an important concept in Eastern philosophy, including Buddhist philosophy.

== Definitions of the self ==
Most philosophical definitions of self—per Descartes, Locke, Hume, and William James—are expressed in the first person. A third person definition does not refer to specific mental qualia but instead strives for objectivity and operationalism.

To another person, the way an individual behaves and speaks reflects their true inner self and can be used to gain insight into who they really are. Therefore, the intentions of another individual can only be inferred from something that emanates from that individual. The particular characteristics of the self determine its identity.

== Concepts of self ==
=== Self as an activity ===
Aristotle, following Plato, defined the psyche (soul) as the core essence of a living being, and while claiming that it did not exist apart from the body, he considered its so-called "intellect" part to be immortal and perpetual, in contrast to its organism-dependent vegetative/nutritive and perceptual functions. In his theory of causes and of act and potency, Aristotle emphasizes beings in relation to their actual manifestation, and in turn the soul was also defined by its actual effects. For instance, if a knife had a soul, the act of cutting would be that soul, because 'cutting' is part of the essence of what it is to be a knife. More precisely, the soul is the "first activity" of a living body. This is a state, or a potential for actual, or 'second', activity. "The axe has an edge for cutting" was, for Aristotle, analogous to "humans have bodies for rational activity," and the potential for rational activity thus constituted the essence of a human soul. He states: "Soul is an actuality or formulable essence of something that possesses a potentiality of being besouled", and also "When mind is set free from its present conditions it appears as just what it is and nothing more: this alone is immortal and eternal". Aristotle used his concept of the soul in many of his works; his main work on the subject is De Anima (On the Soul).

Aristotle also believed that there were four sections of the soul: the calculative and scientific parts on the rational side used for making decisions, and the desiderative and vegetative parts on the irrational side responsible for identifying our needs. A division of the soul's functions and activities is also found in Plato's tripartite theory. The problem of one in many is also remembered by Aristotle, nonetheless:

If then the soul is of its very nature divisible, what holds it together? Not the body, certainly: much rather the contrary seems to be true, that the soul holds the body together; for when it departs, the body expires and decomposes. If there is some other thing which makes it one, this other is rather the soul. One would then have to ask, concerning this other, whether it be one or of many parts. If it is one, why not call it the soul straightway? But if it is divisible, reason again demands, what it is that holds this together? And so on ad infinitum.

=== Self independent of the senses ===
While he was imprisoned in a castle, Avicenna wrote his famous "floating man" thought experiment to demonstrate human self-awareness and the substantiality of the soul. His thought experiment tells its readers to imagine themselves suspended in the air, isolated from all sensations, which includes no sensory contact with even their own bodies. He argues that, in this scenario, one would still have self-consciousness. He thus concludes that the idea of the self is not dependent on any physical thing, and that the soul should not be seen in relative terms, but as a primary given, a substance. This argument was later refined and simplified by René Descartes in epistemic terms when he stated: "I can abstract from the supposition of all external things, but not from the supposition of my own consciousness."

=== Bundle theory of self ===
David Hume pointed out that we tend to think that we are the same person we were five years ago. Although we have changed in many respects, the same person appears present as was present then. We might start thinking about which features can be changed without changing the underlying self. Hume, however, denies that there is a distinction between the various features of a person and the mysterious self that supposedly bears those features. When we start introspecting, "we are never intimately conscious of anything but a particular perception; man is a bundle or collection of different perceptions which succeed one another with an inconceivable rapidity and are in perpetual flux and movement".

It is plain, that in the course of our thinking, and in the constant revolution of our ideas, our imagination runs easily from one idea to any other that resembles it, and that this quality alone is to the fancy a sufficient bond and association. It is likewise evident that as the senses, in changing their objects, are necessitated to change them regularly, and take them as they lie contiguous to each other, the imagination must by long custom acquire the same method of thinking, and run along the parts of space and time in conceiving its objects."

In Hume's view, these perceptions do not belong to anything. Rather, Hume compares the soul to a commonwealth, which retains its identity not by virtue of some enduring core substance, but by being composed of many different, related, and yet constantly changing elements. The question of personal identity then becomes a matter of characterizing the loose cohesion of one's personal experience. (Note that in the Appendix to the Treatise, Hume said without elaboration that he was dissatisfied with his account of the self, yet he never returned to the issue.)

The paradox of the Ship of Theseus can be used as an analogy of the self as a bundle of parts in flux.

=== Self as every thing that is having any experience ===
In the book I am You: The Metaphysical Foundations for Global Ethics, Daniel Kolak argues that the entire concept of the self is incoherent. Kolak describes three opposing philosophical views of personal identity: closed individualism, empty individualism, and open individualism. Closed individualism is considered to be the default view of personal identity, which is that one's personal identity consists of a ray or line traveling through time, and that one has a future self. Empty individualism is another view, which is that personal identity exists, but one's "identity" only persists for an infinitesimally small amount of time, and the "you" that will exist in the future is an ontologically different being from the "you" that exists now. Kolak argues in favor of open individualism, which is the idea that individual personal identity in reality does not exist at all, and all conscious beings are in reality the same being. Similar ideas have been discussed by Derek Parfit in the book Reasons and Persons with thought experiments such as the teletransportation paradox.

=== Self as a narrative center of gravity ===
Daniel Dennett has a deflationary theory of the "self". Selves are not physically detectable. Instead, they are a kind of convenient fiction, like a center of gravity, which is convenient as a way of solving physics problems, although they need not correspond to anything tangible — the center of gravity of a hoop is a point in thin air. People constantly tell themselves stories to make sense of their world, and they feature in the stories as a character, and that convenient but fictional character is the self.

=== Self as merely syntactic ===
Aaron Sloman has proposed that words like self, selves, herself, itself, themselves, myself, etc. do not refer to a special type of entity, but provide powerful syntactical mechanisms for constructing utterances that repeatedly refer to the same thing without tedious and obscure repetition of names or other referring expressions.

=== Self as perspective ===
One conception of the self arises from the observation of one existing as oneself and not as someone else. Benj Hellie coined the phrase "the vertiginous question" to refer to the question of why I am me and not someone else. The question asks why, of all the subjects of experience out there, this one—the one corresponding to the human being referred to as Benj Hellie—is the one whose experiences are live? (The reader is supposed to substitute their own case for Hellie's.) In other words: Why am I me and not someone else? A common response to the question is that it reduces to "Why are Hellie's experiences live from Hellie's perspective," and thus the entire question is a tautology. However, Hellie argues, through a parable, that this response leaves something out. His parable describes two situations, one reflecting a broad global constellation view of the world and everyone's phenomenal features, and one describing an embedded view from the perspective of a single subject. Other philosophers have asked the same question using different terminology. Tim S. Roberts refers to the question of why a particular organism out of all the organisms that happen to exist happens to be you as the "Even Harder Problem of Consciousness". Herbert Spiegelberg has referred to it as the "I-am-me experience", and it has been called the "Ich-Erlebnis" by German psychologists.

Thomas Nagel has extensively discussed the question of personal identity and first-person perspectives in The View from Nowhere. It contrasts passive and active points of view in how humanity interacts with the world, relying either on a subjective perspective that reflects a point of view or an objective perspective that takes a more detached perspective. Nagel describes the objective perspective as the "view from nowhere", one where the only valuable ideas are ones derived independently.

Christian List argues that the existence of first-personal facts has metaphysical implications. List argues that the existence of first-personal facts is evidence against physicalism, and evidence against other third-personal metaphysical pictures, including standard versions of dualism. List also argues that there exists a "quadrilemma" for theories of consciousness. He claims that at most three of the following metaphysical claims can be true: 'first-person realism', 'non-solipsism', 'non-fragmentation', and 'one world' – and thus at least one of these four must be false. List has proposed a model he calls the "many-worlds theory of consciousness" in order to reconcile the subjective nature of consciousness without lapsing into solipsism.

Some philosophers have argued that there exists a connection between the nature of the self and the nature of time. Vincent Conitzer argues that the self is related to A series and B series theories of time, and that arguments in favor of the A-theory of time are more effective as arguments for the combined position of both A-theory being true and the "I" being metaphysically privileged from other perspectives. Caspar Hare has made similar arguments with the theories of egocentric presentism, a form of solipsism introduced by Hare that argues that the experiences of other individuals are not present in the way that one's current perspective is. and perspectival realism, in which things within perceptual awareness have a defining intrinsic property that exists absolutely and not relative to anything. Several other philosophers have written reviews of Caspar Hare's theories.

Other philosophers have discussed various other related ideas. Similar questions are also asked by J. J. Valberg in justifying his horizonal view of the self. Japanese philosopher Hitoshi Nagai has used the concept of first person perspectives as a way of defining the self, defining the self as the "one who directly experiences the consciousness of oneself". It has also been argued that the self is an "idiomodific" concept.

== Self in Eastern spirituality and philosophy ==
The spiritual goal of many traditions involves the dissolving of the ego, in contrast to the essential Self, allowing self-knowledge of one's own true nature to become experienced and enacted in the world. This is variously known as enlightenment, nirvana, presence, and the "here and now".

=== Buddhism ===
Hume's position is similar to Indian Buddhists’ theories and debates about the self, which generally considers a bundle theory to describe the mind phenomena grouped in aggregates (skandhas), such as sense-perceptions, intellective discrimination (saṃjñā), emotions and volition. Since the beginning of Buddhist philosophy, several schools of interpretation assumed that a self cannot be identified with the transient aggregates, as they are non-self, but some traditions questioned further whether there can be an unchanging ground which defines a real and permanent individual identity, sustaining the impermanent phenomena; concepts such as Buddha-nature are found in the Mahayana lineage, and of an ultimate reality in dzogchen tradition, for instance in Dolpopa and Longchenpa. Although Buddhists criticize the immutable ātman of Hinduism, some Buddhist schools problematized the notion of an individual personhood; even among early ones, such as the Pudgala view, it was approached implicitly in questions such as "who is the bearer of the bundle?", "what carries the aggregates?", "what transmigrates from one rebirth to another?" or "what is the subject of self-improvement and enlightenment?".

The Buddha in particular attacked all attempts to conceive of a fixed self, while stating that holding the view "I have no self" is also mistaken. This is an example of the Middle Way charted by the Buddha and the Madhyamaka school of Buddhism. That absence of a self definition is directed to avoid clinging to the "I", seek reality and attain detachment, and it is found in many passages of the oldest Buddha sutras, recorded in the Pali Canon, such as this:

"Bhikkhus, form is not-self. Were form self, then this form would not lead to affliction, and one could have it of form: 'Let my form be thus, let my form be not thus.' And since form is not-self, so it leads to affliction, and none can have it of form: 'Let my form be thus, let my form be not thus.'... Bhikkhus, feeling is not-self... Bhikkhus, perception is not-self... Bhikkhus, determinations are not-self... Bhikkhus, consciousness (vijñāna) is not self.... is form permanent or impermanent?..."

== Self-knowledge ==
Both Western and Eastern civilizations have been occupied with self-knowledge and underscored its importance particularly citing the paradoxical combination of immediate availability and profound obscurity involved in its pursuit. For Socrates, the goal of philosophy was to "know thyself". Lao Tzu, in his Tao Te Ching, says "Knowing others is wisdom. Knowing the self is enlightenment. Mastering others requires force. Mastering the self requires strength." The case is the same for the seers of Upanishads, who maintained that the ultimate real knowledge involves an understanding of the essence of the self and the nature of God. Adi Shankaracharya, in his commentary on Bhagavad Gita says "Self-knowledge alone eradicates misery". "Self-knowledge alone is the means to the highest bliss." Absolute perfection is the consummation of Self-knowledge."

A theory about self-knowledge describes the concept as the capacity to detect that the sensations, thoughts, mental states, and attitudes as one's own. It is linked to other concepts such as self-awareness and self-conception. The rationalist theory, which Immanuel Kant has inspired, also claims that our ability to achieve self-knowledge through rational reflection is partly derived from the fact that we view ourselves as rational agents. This school rejects that self-knowledge is merely derived from observation as it acknowledges the subject as authoritative on account of his ability as an agent to shape his own states.

== See also ==
- Ātman (Buddhism) – Buddhist concept of self
- Being and Time – 1927 book by Martin Heidegger
- Centered world – Metaphysical concept
- Gnosis – Common Greek noun for knowledge
- John Locke's view of the self
- Mirror stage – Psychoanalytic concept
- Open individualism – Theory of personal identity
- Other (philosophy) – Concept in philosophy and psychology
- Personal horizon – Philosophical concept by J. J. Valberg
- Psychology of self – Study of the representation of one's identity
- Religious views on the self
- Self-realization – Fulfillment of one's character or personality
- Self-schema – Set of memories for a person
- Subject (philosophy) – Philosophy terms referring to an observer versus the thing observed
- Vertiginous question – Philosophical question about personal identity
