= Self =

Individual person as the object of its own reflective consciousness

In philosophy, the self is an individual's own being, knowledge, and values, and the relationship between these attributes.

The first-person perspective distinguishes selfhood from personal identity. Whereas "identity" is (literally) sameness and may involve categorization and labeling, selfhood implies a first-person perspective and suggests potential uniqueness. Conversely, "person" is used as a third-person reference. Personal identity can be impaired in late-stage Alzheimer's disease and in other neurodegenerative diseases. Finally, the self is distinguishable from "others". Including the distinction between sameness and otherness, the self versus other is a research topic in contemporary philosophy and contemporary phenomenology (see also psychological phenomenology), psychology, psychiatry, neurology, and neuroscience.

Although subjective experience is central to selfhood, the privacy of this experience is only one of many problems in the philosophy of self and the scientific study of consciousness.

== Psychology ==
The psychology of self is the study of either the cognitive and affective representation of one's identity or the subject of experience. The earliest formulation of the self in modern psychology forms the distinction between two elements I and me. The self as I, is the subjective knower. While, the self as Me, is the subject that is known. Current views of the self in psychology positions the self as playing an integral part in human motivation, cognition, affect, and social identity. Self, following the ideas of John Locke, has been seen as a product of episodic memory but research on people with amnesia reveals that they have a coherent sense of self based on preserved conceptual autobiographical knowledge. Hence, it is possible to correlate cognitive and affective experiences of self with neural processes. A goal of this ongoing research is to provide grounding insight into the elements of which the complex multiple situated selves of human identity are composed.

What the Freudian tradition has subjectively called, "sense of self" is for Jungian analytic psychology, where one's identity is lodged in the persona or ego and is subject to change in maturation. Carl Jung distinguished, "The self is not only the center but also the whole circumference which embraces both conscious and unconscious; it is the center of this totality...". The Self in Jungian psychology is "the archetype of wholeness and the regulating center of the psyche ... a transpersonal power that transcends the ego." As a Jungian archetype, it cannot be seen directly, but by ongoing individuating maturation and analytic observation, can be experienced objectively by its cohesive wholeness-making factor.

Meanwhile, self psychology is a set of psychotherapeutic principles and techniques established by the Austrian-born American psychoanalyst Heinz Kohut upon the foundation of the psychoanalytic method developed by Freud, and is specifically focused on the subjectivity of experience, which, according to self psychology, is mediated by a psychological structure called the self. Examples of psychiatric conditions where such "sameness" may become broken include depersonalization, which sometimes occurs in schizophrenia, where the self appears different from the subject.

== Psychiatry ==
The 'Disorders of the Self' have also been extensively studied by psychiatrists.

For example, facial and pattern recognition take large amounts of brain processing capacity but pareidolia cannot explain many constructs of self for cases of disorder, such as schizophrenia or schizoaffective disorder. One's sense of self can also be changed upon becoming part of a stigmatized group. According to Cox, Abramson, Devine, and Hollon (2012), if an individual has prejudice against a certain group, like the elderly and then later becomes part of this group. This prejudice can be turned inward causing depression.

The philosophy of a disordered self, such as in schizophrenia, is described in terms of what the psychiatrist understands are actual events in terms of neuron excitation but are delusions nonetheless, and the schizo-affective or a schizophrenic person also believes are actual events in terms of essential being. PET scans have shown that auditory stimulation is processed in certain areas of the brain, and imagined similar events are processed in adjacent areas, but hallucinations are processed in the same areas as actual stimulation. In such cases, external influences may be the source of consciousness and the person may or may not be responsible for "sharing" in the mind's process, or the events which occur, such as visions and auditory stimuli, may persist and be repeated often over hours, days, months or years—and the afflicted person may believe themselves to be in a state of rapture or possession.

== Neuroscience ==
Two areas of the brain that are important in retrieving self-knowledge are the medial prefrontal cortex and the medial posterior parietal cortex. The posterior cingulate cortex, the anterior cingulate cortex, and medial prefrontal cortex are thought to combine to provide humans with the ability to self-reflect. The insular cortex is also thought to be involved in the process of self-reference.

== Sociology ==
Culture consists of explicit and implicit patterns of historically derived and selected ideas and their embodiment in institutions, cognitive and social practices, and artifacts. Cultural systems may, on the one hand, be considered as products of action, and on the other, as conditioning elements of further action. The way individuals construct themselves may be different due to their culture.

Hazel Rose Markus and Shinobu Kitayama's theory of the interdependent self hypothesizes that representations of the self in human cultures fall on a continuum from independent to interdependent. The independent self is supposed to be egoistic, unique, separated from the various contexts, critical in judgment, and prone to self-expression. The interdependent self is supposed to be altruistic, similar to others, flexible according to contexts, conformist, and unlikely to express opinions that would disturb the harmony of his or her group of belonging. However, this theory has been criticized by other sociologists, including David Matsumoto for being based on popular stereotypes and myths about different cultures rather than on rigorous scientific research. A 2016 study of 10,203 participants from 55 cultural groups also failed to find a correlation between the postulating series of causal links between culture and self-construals, finding instead that correlations between traits varied both across cultures did not correlate with Markus & Kitayama's identifications of "independent" or "interdependent" self.

== Philosophy ==
The philosophy of self seeks to describe essential qualities that constitute a person's uniqueness or a person's essential being. There have been various approaches to defining these qualities. The self can be considered as the source of consciousness, the agent responsible for an individual's thoughts and actions, or the substantial nature of a person which endures and unifies consciousness over time.

The self has a particular prominence in the thought of René Descartes (1596-1650). In addition to the writings of Emmanuel Levinas (1906-1995) on "otherness", the distinction between "you" and "me" has been further elaborated in Martin Buber's 1923 philosophical work Ich und Du.

In philosophy, the problem of personal identity is concerned with how one is able to identify a single person over a time interval, dealing with such questions as, "What makes it true that a person at one time is the same thing as a person at another time?" or "What kinds of things are we persons?"

A question related to the problem of personal identity is Benj Hellie's vertiginous question. The vertiginous question asks why, of all the subjects of experience out there, this one—the one corresponding to the human being referred to as Benj Hellie—is the one whose experiences are live? (The reader is supposed to substitute their own case for Hellie's.) Hellie's argument is closely related to Caspar Hare's theories of egocentric presentism and perspectival realism, of which several other philosophers have written reviews. Similar questions are also asked repeatedly by J. J. Valberg in justifying his horizonal view of the self, and by Thomas Nagel in The View from Nowhere. Tim S. Roberts refers to the question of why a particular organism out of all the organisms that happen to exist happens to be you as the "Even Harder Problem of Consciousness".

Open individualism is a view in the philosophy of self, according to which there exists only one numerically identical subject, who is everyone at all times, in the past, present and future. It is a theoretical solution to the question of personal identity, being contrasted with "Empty individualism", the view that personal identities correspond to a fixed pattern that instantaneously disappears with the passage of time, and "Closed individualism", the common view that personal identities are particular to subjects and yet survive over time.

Open individualism is related to the concept of anattā in Buddhist philosophy where the term anattā (Pali: 𑀅𑀦𑀢𑁆𑀢𑀸) or anātman (Sanskrit: अनात्मन्) is the doctrine of "non-self" – that no unchanging, permanent self or essence can be found in any phenomenon. While often interpreted as a doctrine denying the existence of a self, anatman is more accurately described as a strategy to attain non-attachment by recognizing everything as impermanent, while staying silent on the ultimate existence of an unchanging essence. In contrast, dominant schools of Hinduism assert the existence of Ātman as pure awareness or witness-consciousness, "reify[ing] consciousness as an eternal self."

One thought experiment in the philosophy of personal identity is the teletransportation paradox. It deals with whether the concept of one's future self is a coherent concept. The thought experiment was formulated by Derek Parfit in his 1984 book Reasons and Persons. Derek Parfit and others consider a hypothetical "teletransporter", a machine that puts you to sleep, records your molecular composition, breaking you down into atoms, and relaying its recording to Mars at the speed of light. On Mars, another machine re-creates you (from local stores of carbon, hydrogen, and so on), each atom in exactly the same relative position. Parfit poses the question of whether or not the teletransporter is actually a method of travel, or if it simply kills and makes an exact replica of the user. Then the teleporter is upgraded. The teletransporter on Earth is modified to not destroy the person who enters it, but instead it can simply make infinite replicas, all of whom would claim to remember entering the teletransporter on Earth in the first place. Using thought experiments such as these, Parfit argues that any criteria we attempt to use to determine sameness of person will be lacking, because there is no further fact. What matters, to Parfit, is simply "Relation R", psychological connectedness, including memory, personality, and so on.

== Religion ==
Religious views on the Self vary widely. The Self is a complex and core subject in many forms of spirituality. Two types of Self are commonly considered—the Self that is the ego, also called the learned, superficial Self of mind and body, egoic creation, and the Self which is sometimes called the "True Self", the "Observing Self", or the "Witness". In Hinduism, the Ātman (Self), despite being experienced as an individual, is actually a representation of the unified transcendent reality, Brahman. Our experience of reality doesn't match the nature of Brahman due to māyā.

One description of spirituality is the Self's search for "ultimate meaning" through an independent comprehension of the sacred. Another definition of spiritual identity is: "A persistent sense of Self that addresses ultimate questions about the nature, purpose, and meaning of life, resulting in behaviors that are consonant with the individual's core values. Spiritual identity appears when the symbolic religious and spiritual value of a culture is found by individuals in the setting of their own life. There can be different types of spiritual Self because it is determined by one's life and experiences."

Human beings have a Self—that is, they are able to look back on themselves as both subjects and objects in the universe. Ultimately, this brings questions about who we are and the nature of our own importance. Traditions such as in Buddhism see the attachment to Self is an illusion that serves as the main cause of suffering and unhappiness.

== See also ==
- Anatta— "not-self", Buddhist concept stating there is no unchanging, permanent self, soul or essence in living beings
- Attention
- Ego death
- Humeanism § Bundle theory of the self
- I (pronoun)
- Individuation
- Jīva (Jainism), or Atman, used within Jainism to identify the soul
- Meditation
- Moral psychology
- Open individualism
- Outline of self
- Person (disambiguation)
- Self remembering
- Self-awareness
- Social projection
- Vertiginous question
- Will (philosophy)

== Sources ==
- Dalal, Roshen (2010). The religions of India: a concise guide to nine major faiths (Rev. ed.). New Delhi: Penguin Books. ISBN 978-0-14-341517-6.
- Deutsch, Eliot (1973), Advaita Vedanta: A Philosophical Reconstruction, University of Hawaii Press
- Gombrich, Richard Francis (2009). What the Buddha thought. Equinox Pub. ISBN 978-1-84553-614-5.
- McClelland, Norman C. (2010), Encyclopedia of Reincarnation and Karma, McFarland, ISBN 978-0-7864-5675-8
- Mackenzie, Matthew (2012). "Luminosity, Subjectivity, and Temporality: An Examination of Buddhist and Advaita views of Consciousness". In Kuznetsova, Irina; Ganeri, Jonardon; Ram-Prasad, Chakravarthi (eds.). Hindu and Buddhist Ideas in Dialogue: Self and No-Self. Routledge.
- Wynne, Alexander (2009). "Early Evidence for the 'no self' doctrine?" (PDF). Oxford Centre for Buddhist Studies: 59–63, 76–77. Archived (PDF) from the original on 2017-06-02.
