= Personal identity =

Philosophical idea of a person having a unique existence

Personal identity is the unique identity of a person over time. Discussions regarding personal identity typically aim to determine the necessary and sufficient conditions under which a person at one time and a person at another time can be said to be the same person, persisting through time.

In philosophy, the problem of personal identity is concerned with how one is able to identify a single person over a time interval, dealing with such questions as, "What makes it true that a person at one time is the same thing as a person at another time?" or "What kinds of things are persons?"

In contemporary metaphysics, the matter of personal identity is referred to as the diachronic problem of personal identity. (Note: Greek: Διαχρονικός, romanized: Diachronikos) The synchronic problem concerns the question of what features and traits characterize a person at a given time. Analytic philosophy and continental philosophy both inquire about the nature of identity. Continental philosophy deals with conceptually maintaining identity when confronted by different philosophical propositions, postulates, and presuppositions about the world and its nature.

== Continuity of substance ==
=== Bodily substance ===
One way to explain how persons persist over time is to say that identity consists in physical or bodily continuity. However, there are problems with this view. As the Ship of Theseus thought experiment illustrates, even for inanimate objects there are difficulties in determining whether one physical body at one time is the same thing as a physical body at another time. With humans, over time our bodies age and grow, losing and gaining matter, and over sufficient years will not consist of most of the matter they once consisted of. It is thus problematic to ground the persistence of personal identity over time in the continuous existence of our bodies. Nevertheless, this approach has its supporters, who define humans as biological organisms. They assert the proposition that a psychological relation is not necessary for personal continuity. (Note: See also: Disjunctive syllogism, Affirming a disjunct, Proof by assertion.) This personal identity ontology assumes the relational theory of life-sustaining processes instead of bodily continuity.

An example of bodily continuity can be seen by many factors but one of which is by the aging process. The older something grows the more their physical development can change such as by the replacement of cells over time. This is why a persons physical appearance can change but they are still the same person overall just with aging factors. This can be seen as an argument to whether a person should only be defined by their physical characteristics.

The teletransportation problem proposed by Derek Parfit is designed to bring out intuitions about corporeal continuity. The thought experiment discusses cases in which a person is teleported from Earth to Mars. Ultimately, the inability to specify where on a spectrum the transmitted person stops being identical to the initial person on Earth appears to show that having a numerically identical physical body is not the criterion for personal identity.

Christian List has argued against physicalist conceptions of consciousness and personal identity on the basis of how first-personal facts relate to third-personal facts. He argues that first-personal facts cannot supervene on third-personal facts, and that this refutes not only physicalism, but also most forms of dualism with purely third-personal metaphysics. List also argues that there exists a "quadrilemma" for theories of consciousness. He claims that at most three of the following metaphysical claims can be true: 'first-person realism', 'non-solipsism', 'non-fragmentation', and 'one world' – and thus at least one of these four must be false. List has proposed a model he calls the "many-worlds theory of consciousness" in order to reconcile the subjective nature of consciousness without lapsing into solipsism.

=== Mental substance ===
In another concept of mind, the set of cognitive faculties (Note: Those faculties that enable consciousness, perception, thinking, judgement, and memory.) are considered to consist of an immaterial substance, separate from and independent of the body. If a person is then identified with their mind, rather than their body—if a person is considered to be their mind—and their mind is such a non-physical substance, then personal identity over time may be grounded in the persistence of this non-physical substance, despite the continuous change in the substance of the body it is associated with.

The mind-body problem concerns the explanation of the relationship, if any, that exists between minds, or mental processes, and bodily states or processes. One of the aims of philosophers who work in this area is to explain how a non-material mind can influence a material body and vice versa. An experience that represents this in the real world is someone getting nervous because they have a presentation or maybe they have to do something in class that they don't want to do. This leads to sweaty hands, a red face, or a faster heartbeat which all relate to a mind-body problem.

Memory and personality are very included when it comes to verifying a person's identity. This is because a person can connect based on a memories to other things. Even if a persons physical appearance were to change, it does not take away from the memories they have experienced or created and ultimately only builds their character overall. Memory and personality can also be very important towards the physical shaping of someone either mentally or physically which is shown through experiences over time.

This is controversial and problematic, and adopting it as a solution raises questions. Perceptual experiences depend on stimuli which arrive at various sensory organs from the external world and these stimuli cause changes in mental states; ultimately causing sensation. (Note: This may be pleasant, unpleasant, or neutral.) A desire for food, for example, will tend to cause a person to move their body in a manner and in a direction to obtain food. The question, then, is how it can be possible for conscious experiences to arise out of an organ (the human brain) possessing electrochemical properties. A related problem is to explain how propositional attitudes (e.g. beliefs and desires) can cause neurons of the brain to fire and muscles to contract in the correct manner. These comprise some of the puzzles that have confronted epistemologists and philosophers of mind from at least the 16th century.

Some philosophers have used a form of indexicality as a way of defining the self. The philosopher Benj Hellie coined the phrase "the vertiginous question" to describe the question of why, of all the subjects of experience out there, this one—the one corresponding to the human being referred to as Benj Hellie—is the one whose experiences are live. (The reader is supposed to substitute their own case for Hellie's.) Other philosophers have described similar phenomena. Tim S. Roberts refers to the question of why a particular organism out of all the organisms that happen to exist happens to be you as the "Even Harder Problem of Consciousness". Herbert Spiegelberg has referred to it as the "I-am-me experience", and it has been called the "Ich-Erlebnis" by German psychologists. Japanese philosopher Hitoshi Nagai defines the self as the "one who directly experiences the consciousness of oneself".

== Continuity of consciousness ==
=== Locke's conception ===
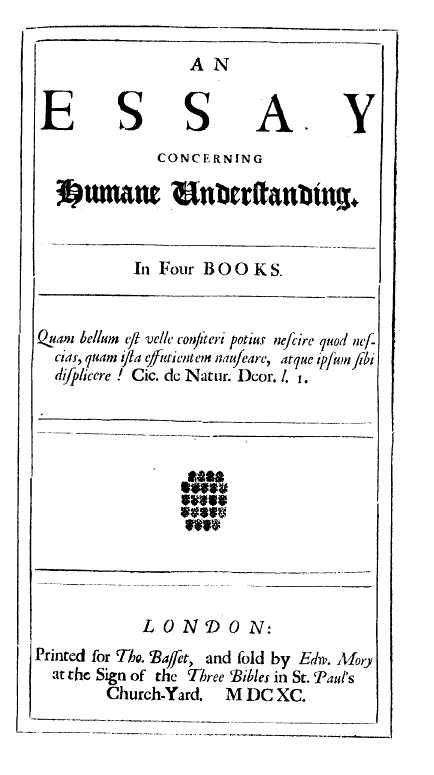
An Essay Concerning Human Understanding in four books (1690) by John Locke (1632–1704)

John Locke considered personal identity (or the self) to be founded on consciousness (viz. memory), and not on the substance of either the soul or the body. Chapter 27 of Book II of his Essay Concerning Human Understanding (1689), entitled "On Identity and Diversity", has been said to be one of the first modern conceptualizations of consciousness as the repeated self-identification of oneself. Through this identification, moral responsibility could be attributed to the subject and punishment and guilt could be justified, as critics such as Nietzsche would point out.

According to Locke, personal identity (the self) "depends on consciousness, not on substance" nor on the soul. We are the same person to the extent that we are conscious of the past and future thoughts and actions in the same way as we are conscious of present thoughts and actions. If consciousness is this "thought" which "goes along with the substance…which makes the same person," then personal identity is only founded on the repeated act of consciousness: "This may show us wherein personal identity consists: not in the identity of substance, but…in the identity of consciousness." For example, one may claim to be a reincarnation of Plato, therefore having the same soul substance. One would be the same person as Plato only if one had the same consciousness of Plato's thoughts and actions that he himself did. Therefore, self-identity is not based on the soul. One soul may have various personalities.

Neither is self-identity founded on the body substance, argues Locke, as the body may change while the person remains the same. Even the identity of animals is not founded on their body: "animal identity is preserved in identity of life, and not of substance," as the body of the animal grows and changes during its life. On the other hand, identity of humans is based on their consciousness. (Note: Take for example a prince's mind which enters the body of a cobbler: to all exterior eyes, the cobbler would remain a cobbler. But to the prince himself, the cobbler would be himself, as he would be conscious of the prince's thoughts and acts, and not those of the cobbler. A prince's consciousness in a cobbler's body: thus the cobbler is, in fact, a prince.)

This border case leads to this problematic thought that since personal identity is based on consciousness, and only oneself can be aware of one's consciousness, exterior human judges may never know if they are really judging—and punishing—the same person, or simply the same body. In other words, Locke argues that one may be judged only for the acts of the body, as this is what is apparent to all but God. We are only responsible for the acts of which we are conscious. This forms the basis of the insanity defense—one cannot be held accountable for acts of which one was unconscious—and therefore leads to philosophical questions:

personal identity consists [not in the identity of substance] but in the identity of consciousness, wherein if Socrates and the present mayor of Queenborough agree, they are the same person: if the same Socrates waking and sleeping do not partake of the same consciousness, Socrates waking and sleeping is not the same person. And to punish Socrates waking for what sleeping Socrates thought, and waking Socrates was never conscious of, would be no more right, than to punish one twin for what his brother-twin did, whereof he knew nothing, because their outsides were so like, that they could not be distinguished; for such twins have been seen.

Or again:

PERSON, as I take it, is the name for this self. Wherever a man finds what he calls himself, there, I think, another may say is the same person. It is a forensic term, appropriating actions and their merit; and so belong only to intelligent agents, capable of a law, and happiness, and misery. This personality extends itself beyond present existence to what is past, only by consciousness,—whereby it becomes concerned and accountable; owns and imputes to itself past actions, just upon the same ground and for the same reason as it does the present. All which is founded in a concern for happiness, the unavoidable concomitant of consciousness; that which is conscious of pleasure and pain, desiring that that self that is conscious should be happy. And therefore whatever past actions it cannot reconcile or APPROPRIATE to that present self by consciousness, it can be no more concerned in it than if they had never been done: and to receive pleasure or pain, i.e. reward or punishment, on the account of any such action, is all one as to be made happy or miserable in its first being, without any demerit at all. For, supposing a MAN punished now for what he had done in another life, whereof he could be made to have no consciousness at all, what difference is there between that punishment and being CREATED miserable? And therefore, conformable to this, the apostle tells us, that, at the great day, when every one shall 'receive according to his doings, the secrets of all hearts shall be laid open.' The sentence shall be justified by the consciousness all person shall have, that THEY THEMSELVES, in what bodies soever they appear, or what substances soever that consciousness adheres to, are the SAME that committed those actions, and deserve that punishment for them.

Henceforth, Locke's conception of personal identity founds it not on the substance or the body, but in the "same continued consciousness", which is also distinct from the soul since the soul may have no consciousness of itself (as in reincarnation). He creates a third term between the soul and the body. For Locke, the body may change, while consciousness remains the same. Therefore, personal identity, for Locke, is not in the body but in consciousness.

=== Philosophical intuition ===
Bernard Williams presents a thought experiment appealing to the intuitions about what it is to be the same person in the future. The thought experiment consists of two approaches to the same experiment.

For the first approach Williams suggests that suppose that there is some process by which subjecting two persons to it can result in the two persons have "exchanged" bodies. The process has put into the body of person B the memories, behavioral dispositions, and psychological characteristics of the person who prior to undergoing the process belonged to person A; and conversely with person B. To show this one is to suppose that before undergoing the process person A and B are asked to which resulting person, A-Body-Person or B-Body-Person, they wish to receive a punishment and which a reward. Upon undergoing the process and receiving either the punishment or reward, it appears to that A-Body-Person expresses the memories of choosing who gets which treatment as if that person was person B; conversely with B-Body-Person.

This sort of approach to the thought experiment appears to show that since the person who expresses the psychological characteristics of person A to be person A, then intuition is that psychological continuity is the criterion for personal identity.

The second approach is to suppose that someone is told that one will have memories erased and then one will be tortured. Does one need to be afraid of being tortured? The intuition is that people will be afraid of being tortured, since it will still be one despite not having one's memories. Next, Williams asked one to consider several similar scenarios. (Note: The synoptical collage of an event or series of actions and events are: One has memories erased, and are given new "fake" memories (counterfeit), and then one is to be tortured; have one's memories erased, are given copies of another's memories, and then are to be tortured; have one's memories erased, are given another's genuine memories, and then one is to be tortured; have one's memories erased, are given another's genuine memories, that person is given one's memories, and then one is to be tortured.) Intuition is that in all the scenarios one is to be afraid of being tortured, that it is still one's self despite having one's memories erased and receiving new memories. The last scenario is identical to the first. (Note: With the supposed superfluous information included in the last scenario.)

In the first approach, intuition is to show that one's psychological continuity is the criterion for personal identity, but in second approach, intuition is that it is one's bodily continuity that is the criterion for personal identity. To resolve this conflict Williams feels one's intuition in the second approach is stronger and if he was given the choice of distributing a punishment and a reward he would want his body-person to receive the reward and the other body-person to receive the punishment, even if that other body-person has his memories.

=== Psychological continuity ===
In psychology, personal continuity, also called personal persistence or self-continuity, is the uninterrupted connection concerning a particular person of their private life and personality. Personal continuity is the union affecting the facets arising from personality in order to avoid discontinuities from one moment of time to another time. (Note: For more, see: consciousness.)

Personal continuity is an important part of identity; this is the process of ensuring that the qualities of the mind, such as self-awareness, sentience, sapience, and the ability to perceive the relationship between oneself and one's environment, are consistent from one moment to the next. Personal continuity is the property of a continuous and connected period of time and is intimately related with a person's body or physical being in a single four-dimensional continuum. Associationism, a theory of how ideas combine in the mind, allows events or views to be associated with each other in the mind, thus leading to a form of learning. Associations can result from contiguity, similarity, or contrast. Through contiguity, one associates ideas or events that usually happen to occur at the same time. Some of these events form an autobiographical memory in which each is a personal representation of the general or specific events and personal facts.

Ego integrity is the psychological concept of the ego's accumulated assurance of its capacity for order and meaning. Ego identity is the accrued confidence that the inner sameness and continuity prepared in the past are matched by the sameness and continuity of one's meaning for others, as evidenced in the promise of a career. Body and ego control organ expressions and of the other attributes of the dynamics of a physical system to face the emotions of ego death in circumstances which can summon, sometimes, anti-theonymistic self-abandonment.

=== Split-brains ===
Some humans have split-brains, a condition in which the corpus callosum, which connects the two brain hemispheres, is severed, for example as a surgical procedure against epilepsy. In this case, the hemispheres can't exchange information, but the affected humans may be able to live a normal life. Sometimes, one half of the brain is fully removed for medical reasons.

In Reasons and Persons, Derek Parfit analyzes what brain splits mean for personal identity. He proposes a thought experiment where a brain is split into halves and integrated into two brain-dead human bodies. Parfit argues that this would result in two different people, neither of whom is identical to the original one. According to him, if personal identity were what matters in survival, this operation would be just as bad as death. Parfit proposes that what matters is instead psychological continuity and/or psychological connectedness.

=== Identity continuum ===
It has been argued from the nature of sensations and ideas that there is no such thing as a permanent identity. Daniel Shapiro asserts that one of four major views on identity does not recognize a "permanent identity" and instead thinks of "thoughts without a thinker"—"a consciousness shell with drifting emotions and thoughts but no essence". According to him this view is based on the Buddhist concept of anatta, "a continuously evolving flow of awareness." Malcolm David Eckel states that "the self changes at every moment and has no permanent identity"—it is a "constant process of changing or becoming;" a "fluid ever-changing self".

== Bundle theory of the self ==
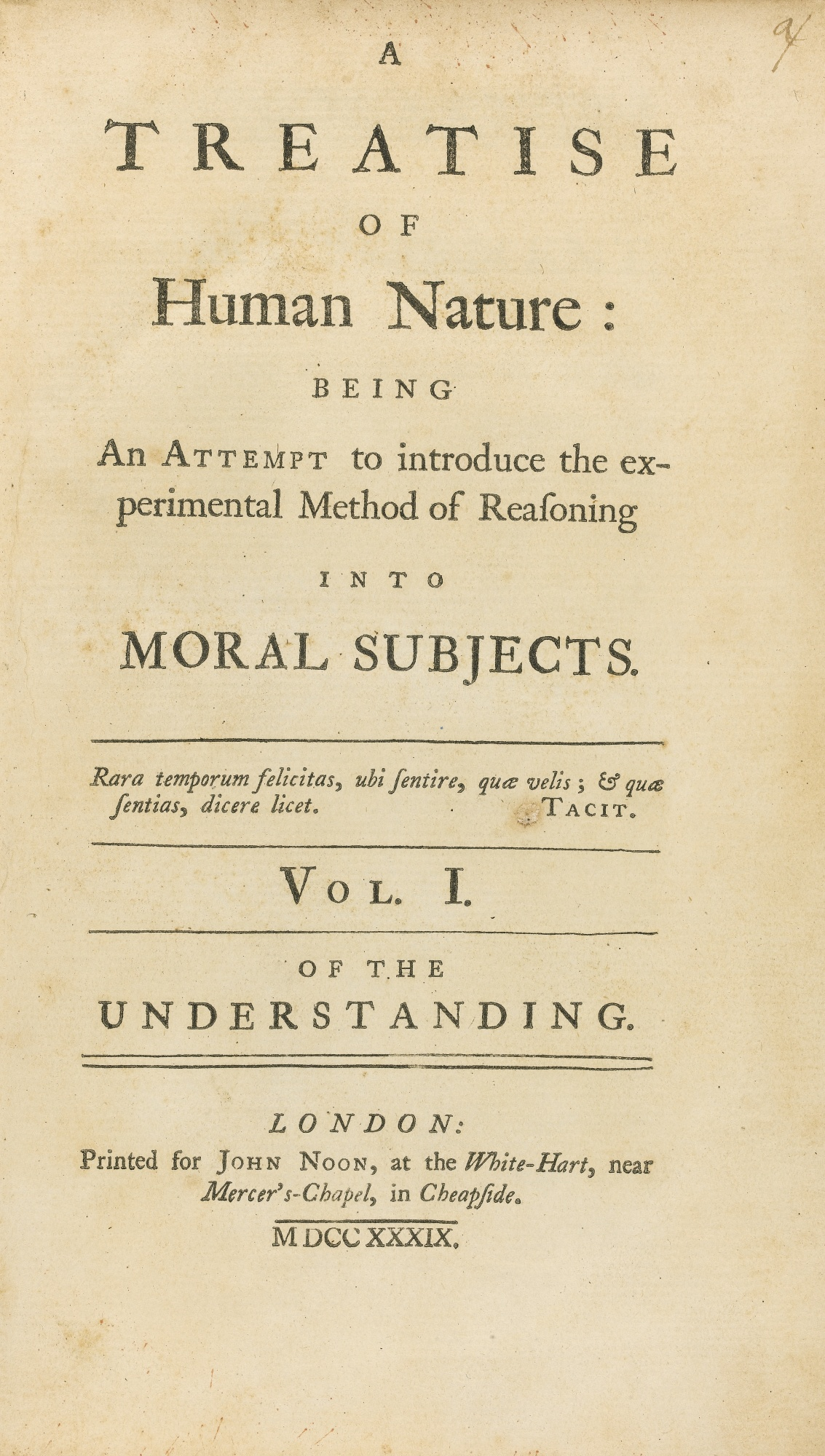
A Treatise Of Human Nature: Being An Attempt To Introduce The Experimental Method Of Reasoning Into Moral Subjects. For John Noon, 1739

David Hume undertook looking at the mind–body problem. Hume also investigated a person's character, the relationship between human and animal nature, and the nature of agency. Hume pointed out that we tend to think that we are the same person we were five years ago. Though we've changed in many respects, the same person appears present now as was present then. We might start thinking about which features can be changed without changing the underlying self. Hume denied a distinction between the various features of a person and the mysterious self that supposedly bears those features. When we begin introspecting:

[We] always stumble on some particular perception or other.… I may venture to affirm of the rest of mankind, that they are nothing but a bundle or collection of different perceptions which succeed each other with an inconceivable rapidity and are in perpetual flux and movement.

It is plain, that in the course of our thinking, and in the constant revolution of our ideas, our imagination runs easily from one idea to any other that resembles it, and that this quality alone is to the fancy a sufficient bond and association. It is likewise evident that as the senses, in changing their objects, are necessitated to change them regularly, and take them as they lie contiguous to each other, the imagination must by long custom acquire the same method of thinking, and run along the parts of space and time in conceiving its objects.

Note in particular that, in Hume's view, these perceptions do not belong to anything. Hume, similar to the Buddha, compares the soul to a commonwealth, which retains its identity not by virtue of some enduring core substance, but by being composed of many different, related, and yet constantly changing elements. The question of personal identity then becomes a matter of characterizing the loose cohesion (Note: See also: structural cohesion) of one's personal experience. (Note: In the Appendix to the Treatise, Hume stated that he was dissatisfied with his account of the self, yet he never returned to the issue.)

In short, what matters for Hume is not that 'identity' exists, but the fact that the relations of causation, contiguity, and resemblances obtain among the perceptions. Critics of Hume state that in order for the various states and processes of the mind to seem unified, there must be something which perceives their unity, the existence of which would be no less mysterious than a personal identity. Hume solves this by considering substance as engendered by the togetherness of its properties.

== No-self theory ==
The "no-self theory" holds that the self cannot be reduced to a bundle because the concept of a self is incompatible with the idea of a bundle. Propositionally, the idea of a bundle implies the notion of bodily or psychological relations that do not in fact exist. James Giles, a principal exponent of this view, argues that the no-self or eliminativist theory and the bundle or reductionist theory agree about the non-existence of a substantive self. The reductionist theory, according to Giles, mistakenly resurrects the idea (Note: And, presumably, resurrection.) of the self in terms of various accounts about psychological relations. (Note: See also: Psychological entropy.) The no-self theory, on the other hand, "lets the self lie where it has fallen". This is because the no-self theory rejects all theories of the self, even the bundle theory. On Giles' reading, Hume is actually a no-self theorist and it is a mistake to attribute to him a reductionist view like the bundle theory. Hume's assertion that personal identity is a fiction supports this reading, according to Giles.

The Buddhist view of personal identity is also a no-self theory rather than a reductionist theory, because the Buddha rejects attempts to reconstructions in terms of consciousness, feelings, or the body in notions of an eternal/permanent, unchanging Self, since our thoughts, personalities and bodies are never the same from moment to moment, as specifically explained in Śūnyatā.

According to this line of criticism, the sense of self is an evolutionary artifact, (Note: See also: Phenotypic traits, Society (Social artifact), Culture (Cultural artifact), evolutionary psychology (criticism of evolutionary psychology).) which saves time in the circumstances it evolved for. But sense of self breaks down when considering some events such as memory loss, (Note: See also: Alzheimer's disease) dissociative identity disorder, brain damage, brainwashing, and various thought experiments. When presented with imperfections in the intuitive sense of self and the consequences to this concept which rely on the strict concept of self, a tendency to mend the concept occurs, possibly because of cognitive dissonance. (Note: Though, this does not address the loose cohesion of self and other similar epistemological views.)

Open individualism is a term coined by Daniel Kolak that refers to the view in the philosophy of self that there exists only one numerically identical subject, who is everyone at all times, in the past, present and future. It is a theoretical solution to the question of personal identity, being contrasted with "Empty individualism", the view that personal identities correspond to a fixed pattern that instantaneously disappears with the passage of time, and "Closed individualism", the common view that personal identities are particular to subjects and yet survive over time.

== Experimental philosophy ==
Since the 21st century, philosophers have also been using the methods of psychological science to better understand philosophical intuitions. This empirical approach to philosophy is known as experimental philosophy or "xPhi" for short. Studies in xPhi have found various psychological factors predict variance even in philosophers views about personal identity.

=== Moral self theory ===
Findings from xPhi suggest that moral intuitions may have a major influence on our intuitions about personal identity. For example, some experimental philosophers have found that when a person undergoes a dramatic change (e.g., traumatic brain injury), people are less likely to think that the person is the "same" after their dramatic change if the person became morally worse (as opposed to morally better). Data like this support the "moral self hypothesis", that "moral traits are essential" to personal identity, with some going as far as saying that, "When someone undergoes dramatic mental change, their numerical identity—whether they're the same person as they were before—can seem to become disrupted".

=== Numerical and qualitative ===
While the direction of change (e.g., moral improvement vs. moral deterioration) has been found to cause substantial shifts in peoples' judgments about personal identity, multiple studies find that none of these shifts constitute thinking that someone is "numerically" non-identical to the person they were before the change—such that the person before the change is one person and the person after the change is an entirely separate second person: when people were asked how many people are described in cases of dramatic moral change, the vast majority of answers were "one" (rather than two or more). This aligns with more recent evidence that these shifts in intuitions about personal identity are about qualitative identity (i.e., how similar one is to a prior version of themselves) rather than numerical identity (i.e., whether there are two or more people described by cases in which a person undergoes a dramatic change).

== Relation to solipsism ==
Philosophers such as Caspar Hare have argued that the existence of personal identity and existing as oneself and not as someone else implies a form of solipsism. Caspar Hare's theories of the metaphysics of self include the theories of egocentric presentism, a form of solipsism introduced by Hare that argues that the experiences of other individuals are not present in the way that one's current perspective is. and perspectival realism, in which things within perceptual awareness have a defining intrinsic property that exists absolutely and not relative to anything. Several other philosophers have written reviews of Caspar Hare's theories.

Vincent Conitzer has argued that there exists a connection between the self and the metaphysics of time. He argues that arguments in favor of the A-theory of time are more effective as arguments for the combined position of both A-theory being true and the "I" being metaphysically privileged from other perspectives.

== See also ==
- Philosophy of self – Concept in philosophy
- Right to personal identity – Human right

=== Identity ===
- Abstract and concrete – Metaphysics concept covering the divide between two types of entities
- Identity and change – Study of fundamental reality
- Nominal identity
- Personal life – Course or state of an individual's life

=== Continuity ===
- Dōgen – Japanese Zen buddhist teacher (1200-1253)
- Hebbian theory – Neuroscientific theory
- Information-theoretic death – Term of art in cryonics
- Meme – Cultural idea that spreads through imitation
- Mindstream – Buddhist concept of continuity of mind
- Noumenon – Object or event that exists independently of the senses
- Neuroplasticity – Ability of the brain to continuously change (Spike-timing-dependent plasticity)
- Perdurantism – Philosophical theory of persistence
- Pratītyasamutpāda – Fundamental Buddhist teaching otherwise known as dependent origination
- Process philosophy – Philosophical approach
- Synchronicity – Jungian concept of the meaningfulness of acausal coincidences

=== Other ===
- Identity and language learning
- Metaphysical necessity
- Otium
- Privacy
- Subjective idealism
- Personhood
- Self-discovery
- Gender system
- The Persistence of Memory (short story)
- The Persistence of Memory
- Transhumanism
