= Most valuable player =

Award in sports

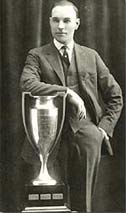
Frank Nighbor with the original Hart Memorial Trophy in 1924. The trophy is awarded annually to the "player judged most valuable to his team" in the National Hockey League (NHL).

In team sports, a most valuable player (MVP) award is an honor typically bestowed upon an individual (or individuals, in the instance of a tie) whose individual performance is the greatest in an entire league, for a particular competition, or on a specific team. The purpose of the award is to recognize the contribution of the individual's efforts amongst a group effort, and to highlight the excellence, exemplariness, and/or outstandingness of a player's performance amidst the performance of their peers in question.

The term can have different connotations depending on the context in which it is used. A 'League MVP' is the most valuable player in an entire league, and refers to the player whose performance is most excellent in the league. Similarly, a "Team MVP" is the most valuable player on a team, referring to the player whose team contribution is greatest amongst their teammates. In many sports, MVP awards are presented for a specific match—in other words, a player of the match award. This is particularly true for high-profile matches like championship games. For example, during a finals championship series, a 'Finals MVP' award, also known as a 'championship MVP' award, would be bestowed upon the most valuable player in the finals game(s). Basketball player Michael Jordan holds the record for most championship MVP awards in any U.S. professional sport.

Ice hockey player, Wayne Gretzky, has been named MVP more times than any player in the history of the other three North American major professional leagues (MLB, NBA, and NFL). He won the award a record nine times during his career, eight consecutively. Barry Bonds is second, having won the MVP award seven times in the National League of Major League Baseball (The American League also awards an MVP), although until the 1930s baseball players were only permitted to win the award one time which limited the number of times Babe Ruth could win. Kareem Abdul-Jabbar won the NBA MVP award six times, and Michael Jordan won the award five times. Peyton Manning won the NFL MVP five times. Only seven other players have won more than two NFL MVP awards: Jim Brown, Johnny Unitas, Brett Favre, Tom Brady, Aaron Rodgers, Patrick Mahomes and Lamar Jackson.

The term is most common in the United States and Canada. In most other countries around the world, "player of the year" is used for a season-spanning award and "player of the match" for individual games. In Australia, Australian rules football clubs and leagues use the term "best and fairest", while those playing rugby league use "player of the year", such as the Dally M Medal.

== History ==
The first most valuable player award given in North American sports can be traced back to professional baseball in the early 1900s. A group of sportswriters met after the 1911 baseball season to determine the "most important and useful players to the club and to the league". These athletes would receive The Chalmers Award, named for Hugh Chalmers, a car manufacturer seeking to increase sales of his Chalmers Model 30 automobiles. The first recipients were Ty Cobb, playing for the Detroit Tigers, and Frank Schulte of the Chicago Cubs. The award was discontinued in 1955, after it failed to result in higher car sales. From 1922 to 1928 in the American League and from 1924 to 1929 in the National League, an MVP award was given to "the baseball player who is of the greatest all-around service to his club". Prior winners were not eligible to win the MVP award again during this time. The MVP award, as it is known today in Major League Baseball, was first established in 1931.

== Selection process ==
Generally, MVP awards are given at the conclusion of a multi-step process. In most professional sports leagues, the overall pool of players is initially narrowed down to a list of nominees, called finalists, forming a group from which the individual winner is decided based on regular season performance. This process is typically performing by way of a vote, wherein voters are usually either other players, members of the media and/or coaches. The specifics of this process varies across leagues. Some prominent examples of sports that conduct MVP awards are baseball, basketball, football, ice hockey, lacrosse, soccer, handball and rugby.

An important distinction is that the MVP is not be conflated with the winningest player. Although the two are usually somewhat correlated, there are several (albeit rare) prime counterexamples. For instance, in professional basketball, Kareem-Abdul Jabbar won the 1975–76 MVP award even though his team did not qualify for the postseason. Additionally, several other NBA players in history have been awarded MVP, and proceeded to lose in the first round of the postseason. In another instance in professional basketball, Jerry West was awarded the 1969 NBA Finals MVP Award, despite having lost the finals. In the sport of professional football, Johnny Unitas won the 1967 MVP award, despite not qualifying for the playoffs. Likewise, O. J. Simpson won the 1973 MVP award, despite not qualifying for the playoffs. Similar to Jerry West in basketball, Chuck Howley in football won the 1971 Super Bowl Most Valuable Player Award despite having lost the Super Bowl V. In 1960, Bobby Richardson won the World Series MVP Award, but lost the World Series. In ice hockey, three players, Al Rollins in 1954, Andy Bathgate in 1959 and Mario Lemieux in 1988 each won the NHL's oldest MVP award, the Hart Trophy, with Lemieux also receiving the Ted Lindsay Award (introduced in 1970–71 and voted on by the league's players), but did not make the playoffs. Also, Reggie Leach won the 1976 Conn Smythe Trophy, presented to the most valuable player in the Stanley Cup playoffs, (Note: The Conn Smythe Trophy is based on performance throughout the Stanley Cup playoffs, which now consist of four rounds, instead of just the Stanley Cup Final.) while breaking the league record for most playoff goals, but lost the finals. In baseball history, several MVPs have not made the playoffs, and in 2021, none of the six MVP finalists in Major League Baseball played for teams that reached the postseason.

=== Baseball ===
In MLB, MVP voting takes place before the postseason, but the results are not announced until after the World Series. The BBWAA began by polling three writers in each league city in 1938, reducing that number to two per league city in 1961. The BBWAA does not offer a clear-cut definition of what "most valuable" means, instead leaving the judgment to the individual voters. The most recent recipients of the award is Pete Crow-Armstrong of the Chicago Cubs and Yordan Alvarez of the Houston Astros.

=== Basketball ===
In the NBA, the protocol for selecting the MVP has shifted throughout the year. Through the 1979–80 season, the basketball players themselves comprised the MVP voting bloc up. Since the start of the 1980 NBA season, a panel of broadcasters and sportswriters are brought together to vote on the MVP award. Every person on the panel casts a vote for their first-place selection all the way to their fifth. A first-place vote nets a player 10 points while a second is worth seven, a third worth five, a fourth worth three, and a fifth worth one. At the end of the voting, the player with the most overall points wins the award. The most recent recipient of the award is Shai Gilgeous-Alexander of the Oklahoma City Thunder.

=== American football ===
In the NFL, the MVP award is voted upon by a panel of 50 sportswriters at the end of the regular season, before the playoffs, though the results are not announced to the public until the day before the Super Bowl. The sportswriters chosen regularly follow the NFL, and remain mostly consistent from year to year. They are chosen based on expertise and are independent of the league itself. The most recent recipient of the award is Matthew Stafford of the Los Angeles Rams.

=== Ice hockey ===
In the NHL, the MVP award voting is conducted at the end of the regular season by members of the Professional Hockey Writers' Association, and each individual voter ranks their top five candidates on a 10–7–5–3–1 point(s) system. Three finalists are named and the trophy is awarded at the NHL Awards ceremony after the playoffs. The most recent recipient of the award is Nikita Kucherov of the Tampa Bay Lightning.

=== Field lacrosse ===
In the PLL, the MVP award (and all other awards) are selected by a two-round voting process. In first round voting, players and coaches will vote to determine nominees for each award. In second round voting, Media, PLL Front Office, and PLL Lacrosse Advisory Board vote on nominees to determine winners. Award winners are announced during the Awards Ceremony at the end of the season. The most recent recipient of the award is Jeff Teat of the New York Atlas.

=== Box lacrosse ===
In the NLL, the MVP award (and all other awards) nominees are voted on by select media. Each ballot allowed the voting members to rank their top five choices for the award. Each individual voter ranks their top five candidates on a 10–7–5–3–1 point(s) system (similar to the NHL system). The top three vote accumulating individuals will be announced as the finalists for the award. The finalist who accumulated the most points after the voting period ended will be the award winner. In the case of a tie, the tiebreaker is to be decided by the individual who received the most 1st Place votes, followed by the number of 2nd place votes, and so on, until a winner is decided. The most recent recipient of the award is Connor Fields of the Rochester Knighthawks.

=== Association football ===
MVP is more commonly referred to in association football as "Player of the Season." In the FIFA World Cup, the award is called the Golden Ball and is chosen by the FIFA Technical Study Group. The most recent recipient of the award is Rodri of Spain, winning it in the 2026 FIFA World Cup.

In the Premier League, Player of the Season is chosen by a panel assembled by the league's sponsors consisting of members of "football's governing bodies, the media and fans," and is announced in the second or third week of May. The most recent recipient of the award is Bruno Fernandes of Manchester United.

== In philosophy of sport ==
The concept of the 'most valuable player' is discussed within the field of philosophy of sport. Philosophers Stephen Kershnar and Neil Feit argue that the concept of the MVP is a fundamentally vague concept, but still valuable in that it promotes the active discussion of different types of excellence found within a specific sport and the weight to be assigned these types, thus leading to a gain for the discussants. Stephen Kershnar termed this vagueness the 'Most Valuable Player Problem'. He offered a solution to the problem, but later recanted it conceding that the problem remains unsolved.

== Examples ==
- Major League Baseball's American and National Leagues, AL and NL Championship Series, and World Series; also All-Star Game
- Nippon Professional Baseball's Nippon Professional Baseball Most Valuable Player Award
- National Football League regular season and Super Bowl; also Pro Bowl
- Hart Memorial Trophy and Lester B. Pearson/Ted Lindsay Award (National Hockey League regular season) and Conn Smythe Trophy (playoffs); the All-Star Game also has an MVP
- National Basketball Association regular season and Finals; also NBA All-Star Game
- Women's National Basketball Association regular season and Finals
- EuroLeague MVP
- Major League Soccer regular season and MLS Cup; also MLS All-Star Game
- FIVB Tournaments
- Canadian Football League regular season, East Division, West Division, and Grey Cup; also "Most Valuable Canadian" awards for the regular season and Grey Cup
- College football's Heisman Trophy
- NCAA basketball tournament; there are also various awards for the player(s) selected as player of the year
- Indian Premier League
- National Basketball League regular season and Grand Final
- Leigh Matthews Trophy, given by the AFL Players Association to the AFL's most valuable player (as opposed to the Brownlow Medal, given to the fairest and best)
- Philippine Basketball Association regular season, PBA Finals; also PBA All-Star Game
- European League of Football both for their regular season and their Championship Game

== See also ==
- Athlete of the Year
- Most Outstanding Player (disambiguation)
