= Indexicality =

Sign pointing to or indexing an object in its context

In semiotics, linguistics, anthropology, and philosophy of language, indexicality is the phenomenon of a sign pointing to (or indexing) some element in the context in which it occurs. A sign that signifies indexically is called an index or, in philosophy, an indexical.

The modern concept originates in the semiotic theory of Charles Sanders Peirce, in which indexicality is one of the three fundamental sign modalities by which a sign relates to its referent (the others being iconicity and symbolism). Peirce's concept has been adopted and extended by several twentieth-century academic traditions, including those of linguistic pragmatics, linguistic anthropology, and Anglo-American philosophy of language.

Words and expressions in language often derive some part of their referential meaning from indexicality. For example, I indexically refers to the entity that is speaking; now indexically refers to a time frame including the moment at which the word is spoken; and here indexically refers to a locational frame including the place where the word is spoken. Linguistic expressions that refer indexically are known as deictics, which thus form a particular subclass of indexical signs, though there is some terminological variation among scholarly traditions.

Linguistic signs may also derive nonreferential meaning from indexicality, for example when features of a speaker's register indexically signal their social class. Nonlinguistic signs may also display indexicality: for example, a pointing index finger may index (without referring to) some object in the direction of the line implied by the orientation of the finger, and smoke may index the presence of a fire.

In linguistics and philosophy of language, the study of indexicality tends to focus specifically on deixis, while in semiotics and anthropology equal attention is generally given to nonreferential indexicality, including altogether nonlinguistic indexicality.

== In linguistic pragmatics ==
In disciplinary linguistics, indexicality is studied in the subdiscipline of pragmatics. Specifically, pragmatics tends to focus on deictics—words and expressions of language that derive some part of their referential meaning from indexicality—since these are regarded as "[t]he single most obvious way in which the relationship between language and context is reflected in the structures of languages themselves" Indeed, in linguistics the terms deixis and indexicality are often treated as synonymous, the only distinction being that the former is more common in linguistics and the latter in philosophy of language. This usage stands in contrast with that of linguistic anthropology, which distinguishes deixis as a particular subclass of indexicality.

== In linguistic anthropology ==
The concept of indexicality was introduced into the literature of linguistic anthropology by Michael Silverstein in a foundational 1976 paper, "Shifters, Linguistic Categories and Cultural Description". Silverstein draws on "the tradition extending from Peirce to Jakobson" of thought about sign phenomena to propose a comprehensive theoretical framework in which to understand the relationship between language and culture, the object of study of modern sociocultural anthropology. This framework, while also drawing heavily on the tradition of structural linguistics founded by Ferdinand de Saussure, rejects the other theoretical approaches known as structuralism, which attempted to project the Saussurean method of linguistic analysis onto other realms of culture, such as kinship and marriage (see structural anthropology), literature (see semiotic literary criticism), music, film and others. Silverstein claims that "[t]hat aspect of language which has traditionally been analyzed by linguistics, and has served as a model" for these other structuralisms, "is just the part that is functionally unique among the phenomena of culture." It is indexicality, not Saussurean grammar, which should be seen as the semiotic phenomenon which language has in common with the rest of culture.

Silverstein argues that the Saussurean tradition of linguistic analysis, which includes the tradition of structural linguistics in the United States founded by Leonard Bloomfield and including the work of Noam Chomsky and contemporary generative grammar, has been limited to identifying "the contribution of elements of utterances to the referential or denotative value of the whole", that is, the contribution made by some word, expression, or other linguistic element to the function of forming "propositions—predications descriptive of states of affairs". This study of reference and predication yields an understanding of one aspect of the meaning of utterances, their semantic meaning, and the subdiscipline of linguistics dedicated to studying this kind of linguistic meaning is semantics.

Yet linguistic signs in contexts of use accomplish other functions than pure reference and predication—though they often do so simultaneously, as though the signs were functioning in multiple analytically distinct semiotic modalities at once. In the philosophical literature, the most widely discussed examples are those identified by J.L. Austin as the performative functions of speech, for instance when a speaker says to an addressee "I bet you sixpence it will rain tomorrow", and in so saying, in addition to simply making a proposition about a state of affairs, actually enters into a socially constituted type of agreement with the addressee, a wager. Thus, concludes Silverstein, "[t]he problem set for us when we consider the actual broader uses of language is to describe the total meaning of constituent linguistic signs, only part of which is semantic." This broader study of linguistic signs relative to their general communicative functions is pragmatics, and these broader aspects of the meaning of utterances is pragmatic meaning. (From this point of view, semantic meaning is a special subcategory of pragmatic meaning, that aspect of meaning which contributes to the communicative function of pure reference and predication.).

Silverstein introduces some components of the semiotic theory of Charles Sanders Peirce as the basis for a pragmatics which, rather than assuming that reference and predication are the essential communicative functions of language with other nonreferential functions being mere addenda, instead attempts to capture the total meaning of linguistic signs in terms of all of their communicative functions. From this perspective, the Peircean category of indexicality turns out to "give the key to the pragmatic description of language."

This theoretical framework became an essential presupposition of work throughout the discipline in the 1980s and remains so in the present.

=== Adaptation of Peircean semiotics ===
The concept of indexicality has been greatly elaborated in the literature of linguistic anthropology since its introduction by Silverstein, but Silverstein himself adopted the term from the theory of sign phenomena, or semiotics, of Charles Sanders Peirce. As an implication of his general metaphysical theory of the three universal categories, Peirce proposed a model of the sign as a triadic relationship: a sign is "something which stands to somebody for something in some respect or capacity." Thus, more technically, a sign consists of

- A sign-vehicle or representamen, the perceptible phenomenon which does the representing, whether audibly, visibly or in some other sensory modality;
- An object, the entity of whatever kind, with whatever modal status (experienceable, potential, imaginary, law-like, etc.), which is represented by the sign; and
- An interpretant, the "idea in the mind" of the perceiving individual, which interprets the sign-vehicle as representing the object.

Peirce further proposed to classify sign phenomena along three different dimensions by means of three trichotomies, the second of which classifies signs into three categories according to the nature of the relationship between the sign-vehicle and the object it represents. As captioned by Silverstein, these are:

- Icon: a sign in which "the perceivable properties of the sign vehicle itself have isomorphism to (up to identity with) those of the entity signaled. That is, the entities are 'likenesses' in some sense."
- Index: a sign in which "the occurrence of a sign vehicle token bears a connection of understood spatio-temporal contiguity to the occurrence of the entity signaled. That is, the presence of some entity is perceived to be signaled in the context of communication incorporating the sign vehicle."
- Symbol: the residual class, a sign which is not related to its object by virtue of bearing some qualitative likeness to it, nor by virtue of co-occurring with it in some contextual framework. These "form the class of 'arbitrary' signs traditionally spoken of as the fundamental kind of linguistic entity. Sign vehicle and entity signaled are related through the bond of a semantico-referential meaning" which permits them to be used to refer to any member of a whole class or category of entities.

Silverstein observes that multiple signs may share the same sign-vehicle. For instance, as mentioned, linguistic signs as traditionally understood are symbols, and analyzed in terms of their contribution to reference and predication, since they arbitrarily denote a whole class of possible objects of reference by virtue of their semantic meanings. But in a trivial sense each linguistic sign token (word or expression spoken in an actual context of use) also functions iconically, since it is an icon of its type in the code (grammar) of the language. It also functions indexically, by indexing its symbol type, since its use in context presupposes that such a type exists in the semantico-referential grammar in use in the communicative situation (grammar is thus understood as an element of the context of communication).

So icon, index and symbol are not mutually exclusive categories—indeed, Silverstein argues, they are to be understood as distinct modes of semiotic function, which may be overlaid on a single sign-vehicle. This entails that one sign-vehicle may function in multiple semiotic modes simultaneously. This observation is the key to understanding deixis, traditionally a difficult problem for semantic theory.

=== Referential indexicality (deixis) ===
In linguistic anthropology, deixis is defined as referential indexicality—that is, morphemes or strings of morphemes, generally organized into closed paradigmatic sets, which function to "individuate or single out objects of reference or address in terms of their relation to the current interactive context in which the utterance occurs". Deictic expressions are thus distinguished, on the one hand, from standard denotational categories such as common nouns, which potentially refer to any member of a whole class or category of entities: these display purely semantico-referential meaning, and in the Peircean terminology are known as symbols. On the other hand, deixis is distinguished as a particular subclass of indexicality in general, which may be nonreferential or altogether nonlinguistic.

In the older terminology of Otto Jespersen and Roman Jakobson, these forms were called shifters. Silverstein, by introducing the terminology of Peirce, was able to define them more specifically as referential indexicals.

=== Non-referential indexicality ===
Non-referential indices or "pure" indices do not contribute to the semantico-referential value of a speech event yet "signal some particular value of one or more contextual variables." Non-referential indices encode certain metapragmatic elements of a speech event's context through linguistic variations. The degree of variation in non-referential indices is considerable and serves to infuse the speech event with, at times, multiple levels of pragmatic "meaning". Of particular note are: sex/gender indices, deference indices (including the affinal taboo index), affect indices, as well as the phenomena of phonological hypercorrection and social identity indexicality.

==== Indexical order ====
In much of the research currently conducted upon various phenomena of non-referential indexicality, there is an increased interest in not only what is called first-order indexicality, but subsequent second-order as well as "higher-order" levels of indexical meaning. First-order indexicality can be defined as the first level of pragmatic meaning that is drawn from an utterance. For example, instances of deference indexicality, such as the variation between informal tu and formal vous in French, indicate a speaker/addressee communicative relationship built upon the values of power and solidarity possessed by the interlocutors. When a speaker addresses somebody using the V form instead of the T form, they index (via first-order indexicality) their understanding of the need for deference to the addressee. In other words, they perceive or recognize an incongruence between their levels of power and/or solidarity and employ a more formal way of addressing that person to suit the contextual constraints of the speech event.

Second-Order Indexicality is concerned with the connection between linguistic variables and the metapragmatic meanings that they encode. For example, a woman is walking down the street in Manhattan and she stops to ask somebody where a McDonald's is. He responds to her talking in a heavy "Brooklyn" accent. She notices this accent and considers a set of possible personal characteristics that might be indexed by it (such as the man's intelligence, economic situation, and other non-linguistic aspects of his life). The power of language to encode these preconceived "stereotypes" based solely on accent is an example of second-order indexicality (representative of a more complex and subtle system of indexical form than that of first-order indexicality).

==== Sex/gender indices ====
One common system of non-referential indexicality is sex/gender indices. These indices index the gender or "female/male" social status of the interlocutor. There are a multitude of linguistic variants that act to index sex and gender such as:

- word-final or sentence-final particles: many languages employ the suffixation of word-final particles to index the gender of the speaker. These particles vary from phonological alterations such as the one explored by William Labov in his work on postvocalic /r/ employment in words that had no word final "r" (which is claimed, among other things, to index the "female" social sex status by virtue of the statistical fact that women tend to hypercorrect their speech more often than men); suffixation of single phonemes, such as /-s/ in Muskogean languages of the southeastern United States; or particle suffixation (such as the Japanese sentence-final use of -wa with rising intonation to indicate increasing affect and, via second-order indexicality, the gender of the speaker (in this case, female))
- morphological and phonological mechanisms: such as in Yana, a language where one form of all major words are spoken by sociological male to sociological male, and another form (which is constructed around phonological changes in word forms) is used for all other combination of interlocutors; or the Japanese prefix-affixation of o- to indicate politeness and, consequently, feminine social identity.

Many instances of sex/gender indices incorporate multiple levels of indexicality (also referred to as indexical order). In fact, some, such as the prefix-affixation of o- in Japanese, demonstrate complex higher-order indexical forms. In this example, the first order indexes politeness and the second order indexes affiliation with a certain gender class. It is argued that there is an even higher level of indexical order evidenced by the fact that many jobs use the o- prefix to attract female applicants. This notion of higher-order indexicality is similar to Silverstein's discussion of "wine talk" in that it indexes "an identity-by-visible-consumption [here, employment]" that is an inherent of a certain social register (i.e. social gender indexicality).

==== Affect indices ====
Affective meaning is seen as "the encoding, or indexing of speakers emotions into speech events." The interlocutor of the event "decodes" these verbal messages of affect by giving "precedence to intentionality"; that is, by assuming that the affective form intentionally indexes emotional meaning.

Some examples of affective forms are: diminutives (for example, diminutive affixes in Indo-European and Amerindian languages indicate sympathy, endearment, emotional closeness, or antipathy, condescension, and emotional distance); ideophones and onomatopoeias; expletives, exclamations, interjections, curses, insults, and imprecations (said to be "dramatizations of actions or states"); intonation change (common in tone languages such as Japanese); address terms, kinship terms, and pronouns which often display clear affective dimensions (ranging from the complex address-form systems found languages such a Javanese to inversions of vocative kin terms found in Rural Italy); lexical processes such as synecdoche and metonymy involved in effect meaning manipulation; certain categories of meaning like evidentiality; reduplication, quantifiers, and comparative structures; as well as inflectional morphology.

Affective forms are a means by which a speaker indexes emotional states through different linguistic mechanisms. These indices become important when applied to other forms of non-referential indexicality, such as sex indices and social identity indices, because of the innate relationship between first-order indexicality and subsequent second-order (or higher) indexical forms. (See multiple indices section for Japanese example).

==== Deference indices ====
Deference indices encode deference from one interlocutor to another (usually representing inequalities of status, rank, age, sex, etc.). Some examples of deference indices are:

===== T/V deference entitlement =====
The T/V deference entitlement system of European languages was famously detailed by linguists Brown and Gilman. T/V deference entitlement is a system by which a speaker/addressee speech event is determined by perceived disparities of 'power' and 'solidarity' between interlocutors. Brown and Gilman organized the possible relationships between the speaker and the addressee into six categories:

1. Superior and solidary
2. Superior and not solidary
3. Equal and solidary
4. Equal and not solidary
5. Inferior and solidary
6. Inferior and not solidary

The 'power semantic' indicates that the speaker in a superior position uses T and the speaker in an inferior position uses V. The 'solidarity semantic' indicates that speakers use T for close relationships and V for more formal relationships. These two principles conflict in categories 2 and 5, allowing either T or V in those cases:

1. Superior and solidary: T
2. Superior and not solidary: T/V
3. Equal and solidary: T
4. Equal and not solidary: V
5. Inferior and solidary: T/V
6. Inferior and not solidary: V

Brown and Gilman observed that as the solidarity semantic becomes more important than the power semantic in various cultures, the proportion of T to V use in the two ambiguous categories changes accordingly.

Silverstein comments that while exhibiting a basic level of first-order indexicality, the T/V system also employs second-order indexicality vis-à-vis 'enregistered honorification'. He cites that the V form can also function as an index of valued "public" register and the standards of good behavior that are entailed by use of V forms over T forms in public contexts. Therefore, people will use T/V deference entailment in 1) a first-order indexical sense that distinguishes between speaker/addressee interpersonal values of 'power' and 'solidarity' and 2) a second-order indexical sense that indexes an interlocutor's inherent "honor" or social merit in employing V forms over T forms in public contexts.

===== Japanese honorifics =====
Japanese provides an excellent case study of honorifics. Honorifics in Japanese can be divided into two categories: addressee honorifics, which index deference to the addressee of the utterance; and referent honorifics, which index deference to the referent of the utterance. Cynthia Dunn claims that "almost every utterance in Japanese requires a choice between direct and distal forms of the predicate." The direct form indexes intimacy and "spontaneous self-expression" in contexts involving family and close friends. Contrarily, distal form index social contexts of a more formal, public nature such as distant acquaintances, business settings, or other formal settings.

Japanese also contains a set of humble forms (Japanese kenjōgo 謙譲語) which are employed by the speaker to index their deference to someone else. There are also suppletive forms that can be used in lieu of regular honorific endings (for example, the subject honorific form of taberu (食べる, to eat): meshiagaru (召し上がる). Verbs that involve human subjects must choose between distal or direct forms (towards the addressee) as well as a distinguish between either no use of referent honorifics, use of subject honorific (for others), or use of humble form (for self). The Japanese model for non-referential indexicality demonstrates a very subtle and complicated system that encodes social context into almost every utterance.

===== Affinal taboo index =====
Dyirbal, a language of the Cairns rain forest in Northern Queensland, employs a system known as the affinal taboo index. Speakers of the language maintain two sets of lexical items: 1) an "everyday" or common interaction set of lexical items and 2) a "mother-in-law" set that is employed when the speaker is in the very distinct context of interaction with their mother-in-law. In this particular system of deference indices, speakers have developed an entirely separate lexicon (there are roughly four "everyday" lexical entries for every one "mother-in-law" lexical entry; 4:1) to index deference in contexts inclusive of the mother-in-law.

==== Hypercorrection as a social class index ====
Hypercorrection is defined by Wolfram as "the use of speech form on the basis of false analogy." DeCamp defines hypercorrection in a more precise fashion claiming that "hypercorrection is an incorrect analogy with a form in a prestige dialect which the speaker has imperfectly mastered." Many scholars argue that hypercorrection provides both an index of "social class" and an "Index of Linguistic insecurity". The latter index can be defined as a speaker's attempts at self-correction in areas of perceived linguistic insufficiencies which denote their lower social standing and minimal social mobility.

Donald Winford conducted a study that measured the phonological hypercorrection in creolization of English speakers in Trinidad. He claims that the ability to use prestigious norms goes "hand-in-hand" with knowledge of stigmatization afforded to use of "lesser" phonological variants. He concluded that sociologically "lesser" individuals would try to increase the frequency of certain vowels that were frequent in the high prestige dialect, but they ended up using those vowels even more than their target dialect. This hypercorrection of vowels is an example of non-referential indexicality that indexes, by virtue of innate urges forcing lower class civilians to hypercorrect phonological variants, the actual social class of the speaker. As Silverstein claims, this also conveys an "Index of Linguistic insecurity" in which a speaker not only indexes their actual social class (via first-order indexicality) but also the insecurities about class constraints and subsequent linguistic effects that encourage hypercorrection in the first place (an incidence of second-order indexicality).

William Labov and many others have also studied how hypercorrection in African American Vernacular English demonstrates similar social class non-referential indexicality.

==== Multiple indices in social identity indexicality ====
Multiple non-referential indices can be employed to index the social identity of a speaker. An example of how multiple indexes can constitute social identity is exemplified by Ochs discussion of copula deletion: "That Bad" in American English can index a speaker to be a child, foreigner, medical patient, or elderly person. Use of multiple non-referential indices at once (for example copula deletion and raising intonation), helps further index the social identity of the speaker as that of a child.

Linguistic and non-linguistic indices are also an important ways of indexing social identity. For example, the Japanese utterance -wa in conjunction with raising intonation (indexical of increasing affect) by one person who "looks like a woman" and another who looks "like a man" may index different affective dispositions which, in turn, can index gender difference. Ochs and Schieffelin also claim that facial features, gestures, as well as other non-linguistic indices may actually help specify the general information provided by the linguistic features and augment the pragmatic meaning of the utterance.

==== Oinoglossia (wine talk) ====
For demonstrations of higher (or rarefied) indexical orders, Michael Silverstein discusses the particularities of "life-style emblematization" or "convention-dependent-indexical iconicity" which, as he claims, is prototypical of a phenomenon he dubs "wine talk". Professional wine critics use a certain "technical vocabulary" that are "metaphorical of prestige realms of traditional English gentlemanly horticulture." Thus, a certain "lingo" is created for wine that indexically entails certain notions of prestigious social classes or genres. When "yuppies" use the lingo for wine flavors created by these critics in the actual context of drinking wine, Silverstein argues that they become the "well-bred, interesting (subtle, balanced, intriguing, winning, etc.) person" that is iconic of the metaphorical "fashion of speaking" employed by people of higher social registers, demanding notoriety as a result of this high level of connoisseurship. In other words, the wine drinker becomes a refined, gentlemanly critic and, in doing so, adopts a similar level of connoisseurship and social refinement. Silverstein defines this as an example of higher-order indexical "authorization" in which the indexical order of this "wine talk" exists in a "complex, interlocking set of institutionally formed macro-sociological interests." A speaker of English metaphorically transfers him- or herself into the social structure of the "wine world" that is encoded by the oinoglossia of elite critics using a very particular "technical" terminology.

The use of "wine talk" or similar "fine-cheeses talk", "perfume talk", "Hegelian-dialectics talk", "particle-physics talk", "DNA-sequencing talk", "semiotics talk" etc. confers upon an individual an identity-by-visible-consumption indexical of a certain macro-sociological elite identity and is, as such, an instance of higher-order indexicality.

== In philosophy of language ==
Philosophical work on language from the mid-20th century, such as that of J.L. Austin and the ordinary language philosophers, has provided much of the originary inspiration for the study of indexicality and related issues in linguistic pragmatics (generally under the rubric of the term deixis), though linguists have appropriated concepts originating in philosophical work for purposes of empirical study, rather than for more strictly philosophical purposes.

However, indexicality has remained an issue of interest to philosophers who work on language. In contemporary analytic philosophy, the preferred nominal form of the term is indexical (rather than index), defined as "any expression whose content varies from one context of use to another ... [for instance] pronouns such as 'I', 'you', 'he', 'she', 'it', 'this', 'that', plus adverbs such as 'now', 'then', 'today', 'yesterday', 'here', and 'actually'. This exclusive focus on linguistic expressions represents a narrower construal than is preferred in linguistic anthropology, which regards linguistic indexicality (deixis) as a special subcategory of indexicality in general, which is often nonlinguistic.

Indexicals appear to represent an exception to, and thus a challenge for, the understanding of natural language as the grammatical coding of logical propositions; they thus "raise interesting technical challenges for logicians seeking to provide formal models of correct reasoning in natural language."

The American logician David Kaplan is regarded as having developed "[b]y far the most influential theory of the meaning and logic of indexicals".

== In philosophy of mind and metaphysics ==
An abstract diagram depicting the "constellation" view with subjects represented as circles (○)

An abstract diagram depicting the "embedded" view, with the lived subject depicted as a black circle (●)

An abstract diagram depicting the world as "centered" around a specific individual

Indexicality is also studied in relation to fundamental issues in epistemology, self-consciousness, and metaphysics, for example asking whether indexical facts are facts that do not follow from the physical facts, and thus also form a link between philosophy of language and philosophy of mind. Related ideas include haecceity in medieval scholastic philosophy, and the type-token distinction.

Some philosophers have used indexicality as a way of defining the self. The philosopher Benj Hellie coined the phrase "the vertiginous question" to describe the question of why, of all the subjects of experience out there, this one—the one corresponding to the human being referred to as Benj Hellie—is the one whose experiences are live. (The reader is supposed to substitute their own case for Hellie's.) Other philosophers have described similar phenomena. Tim S. Roberts refers to the question of why a particular organism out of all the organisms that happen to exist happens to be you as the "Even Harder Problem of Consciousness". Herbert Spiegelberg has referred to it as the "I-am-me experience", or the "Ich-Erlebnis" in German. Japanese philosopher Hitoshi Nagai has used the concept of first person perspectives as a way of defining the self, defining the self as the "one who directly experiences the consciousness of oneself".

Similar ideas have been discussed by Thomas Nagel in the book The View from Nowhere. It contrasts passive and active points of view in how humanity interacts with the world, relying either on a subjective perspective that reflects a point of view or an objective perspective that takes a more detached perspective. Nagel describes the objective perspective as the "view from nowhere", one where the only valuable ideas are ones derived independently.

The concept of indexicality has also been applied to the anthropic principle, also known as the observation selection effect. In the book Anthropic Bias, Nick Bostrom investigates how to reason when one suspects that evidence is biased by "observation selection effects", in other words, when the evidence presented has been pre-filtered by the condition that there was some appropriately positioned observer to "receive" the evidence. This conundrum is sometimes called "self-locating beliefs", or "indexical information".

The book first discusses the fine-tuned universe hypothesis and its possible explanations, notably considering the possibility of a multiverse. Bostrom argues against the self-indication assumption (SIA), a term he uses to characterize some existing views, and introduces the self-sampling assumption (SSA). He later refines SSA into the strong self-sampling assumption (SSSA), which uses observer-moments instead of observers to address certain paradoxes in anthropic reasoning.

David Lewis proposed a thought experiment in which there are two omniscient gods. The gods each live in different possible worlds, and know all propositional facts about their particular world. One god lives on top of the tallest mountain and throws manna, while the other lives on top of the coldest mountain and throws thunderbolts. Lewis argued that the gods would still be ignorant about which particular god they are, and that if they lack knowledge but not propositional knowledge, this implies the existence of non-propositional facts. Each world is "centered" around an individual in a way that is indexical rather than propositional.

== See also ==
- Conversational scoreboard
- Quasi-indexical
