= Transcendental apperception =

Philosophical term employed by Immanuel Kant

In philosophy, transcendental apperception is a term employed by Immanuel Kant and subsequent Kantian philosophers to designate that which makes experience possible. The term can also be used to refer to the junction at which the self and the world come together. Transcendental apperception is the uniting and building of coherent consciousness out of different elementary inner experiences (differing in both time and topic, but all belonging to self-consciousness). For example, the experience of "passing of time" relies on this transcendental unity of apperception, according to Kant.

There are six steps to transcendental apperception:

1. All experience is the succession of a variety of contents (an idea taken from David Hume).
2. To be experienced at all, the successive data must be combined or held together in a unity for consciousness.
3. Unity of experience therefore implies a unity of self.
4. The unity of self is as much an object of experience as anything is.
5. Therefore, experience both of the self and its objects rests on acts of synthesis that, because they are the conditions of any experience, are not themselves experienced.
6. These prior syntheses are made possible by the categories. Categories allow us to synthesize the self and the objects.

One consequence of Kant's notion of transcendental apperception is that the "self" is only ever encountered as appearance, never as it is in itself.

The term was later adapted in psychology by Johann Friedrich Herbart (see Apperception).

== Sources ==
- Glendinning, Simon, ed. 1999. The Edinburgh Encyclopedia of Continental Philosophy. Vol. 1999, pt. 2. Edinburgh: Edinburgh UP. ISBN 0-7486-0783-8.
