= Philosophy of sport =

Area of philosophy

Philosophy of sport is an area of philosophy that seeks to conceptually analyze issues of sport as human activity. These issues cover many areas, but fall primarily into five philosophical categories: metaphysics, ethics and moral philosophy, philosophy of law, political philosophy and aesthetics. The philosophical perspective on sport originated in Ancient Greece, having experienced a revival in the latter part of the 20th century with the work of Paul Weiss and Howard Slusher.

A philosophical perspective on sports incorporates its metaphysical relationships with art and play, ethical issues of virtue and fairness, and is more broadly sociopolitical.

== History of the philosophy of sport ==
=== Sport and philosophy in ancient Greece ===
Ancient Greece is considered the birthplace of both ancient philosophy and Olympic sport. Hellenistic philosophies hung great significance on athletic performance. A leader's athletic prowess, according to the view of the times, reflected their ability to lead. (Games of the Phaeacians in Homer's Odyssey) Sport was seen as an epistemic inquiry, a methodological process by which we learn the objective truth of a person's athletic potential by actualizing it in athletic competition. Athletics as a measure of individual worth was seen as a cure to social inequality. Sport was even seen as moral education, with Plato advocating for the participation of women in sport for their moral enrichment. Aristotle emphasized physical activity as an ethical responsibility.

=== 19th century predecessors ===
Philosophical considerations of sport and physical and activity were discussed as a subset of educational reform in the late 19th century as the link between physical education and health and well-being gained appreciation among scholars. To many of the time, the health and educational benefits of physical activity were a component of public life. Inadvertently, many non-philosopher proponents of physical education took on philosophical positions on teleology––mind-body dualism––and metaphysics as part of their model of human agency and personhood. In a broader context, political philosophy entered the picture as thinkers of the time, in response to pressing social and political issues of the day, associated civic duty, responsible citizenship, and other political features, to sport. While much of the focus has been on the work done in the West, philosophers of sport have also acknowledged the importance of philosophical work done in the East, particularly in Japan.

=== Contemporary philosophy of sport ===
The resurgence of interest in philosophy of sport was marked by Yale philosopher Paul Weiss' publishing of the book Sport: A Philosophical Inquiry (1969), considered to be the first book-length text relating to the concept of philosophy of sport. In it, Weiss explains the lack of published work in philosophy of sport as a reflection of academic elitism. Sport was always considered vulgar or common in academic spaces, according to Weiss.

Important questions in philosophy of sport are concerned with the social virtues of sport, the aesthetics of sporting performances and display, the epistemology of individual and team strategy and techniques, sporting ethics, the logic of rules in sport, metaphysics of sport as a component of human nature or instinct, etc. However, some writers have composed a philosophy of sport in terms of the body, art and its intersections with generation X sports, such as bouldering, surfing, and skateboarding.

Other areas of intersection with contemporary areas of philosophy include philosophy of education, philosophy of law, philosophy of mind, philosophy of rules, philosophy of science, social philosophy and political philosophy.

== Issues in philosophy of sport ==
=== Distinguishing sport from play and games ===
Sport is thought in terms of both play and games, yet is not identical with either. "There are few words in the English language which have such a multiplicity of divergent meanings as the word sport,” wrote philosopher H. Graves at the beginning of the 20th century. The continued debate about the definition of sport continues to support the observation. In his seminal and aptly named "Tricky Triad: Games, Play, and Sport" (1988), Bernard Suits distinguishes sport as "enterprises or institutions" which mere play or game fail to meet. Other scholars have developed challenging accounts from Suits on all three, and have disputed his definition of sport. One additional requirement proposed is that sport must demonstrate some physical skill of the participants, of which the outcome is designed to be reflective.

=== Ethics ===
Ethical issues in philosophy of sport predominantly center on athlete behavior in relation to rules of the game, other athletes, spectators, external factors such as socioeconomic issues among supporters and communities, and issues of doping.

Issues of doping in sports, such as steroid use, focus on the ethics of medical intervention in athletic performance: what is acceptable versus what is not, and how boundaries can be drawn. Particular attention is given to the question of what factors ought to be taken into consideration when banning certain forms of medical intervention.

These and other issues are usually compared and contrasted through the lenses of three significant moral theories: consequentialism, deontology and virtue ethics.

=== Most Valuable Player problem ===
The concept of the 'most valuable player' is discussed within the field of philosophy of sport. Philosophers Stephen Kershnar and Neil Feit argue that the concept of the MVP is a fundamentally vague concept, but yet valuable in that it promotes the active discussion of different types of excellence found within a specific sport and the weight to be assigned these types, thus leading to a gain for the discussants. Stephen Kershnar termed this vagueness the 'Most Valuable Player Problem'. He offered a solution to the problem but later recanted it, conceding that the problem remains unsolved.
