= Open individualism =

Theory of personal identity

Open individualism is a theory of personal identity according to which all conscious beings share a single, numerically identical subject of experience, despite having different bodies, memories and experiences. The theory holds that differences between individual organisms and their psychological histories do not necessarily establish boundaries between distinct subjects of consciousness.

The term was used by philosopher Daniel Kolak in I Am You: The Metaphysical Foundations for Global Ethics (2004). Kolak contrasted open individualism with two other theories of personal identity: closed individualism, according to which individuals have separate identities that persist over time, and empty individualism, according to which there is no enduring subject of experience. A related theory was developed by philosopher Arnold Zuboff, who calls his position "universalism".

An abstract diagram depicting the "constellation" view with subjects represented as circles (○)

An abstract diagram depicting the "embedded" view, with the lived subject depicted as a black circle (●)

An abstract diagram depicting the world as "centered" around a specific individual

== Theory ==
=== Personal identity ===
Kolak distinguishes between three views of personal identity. Under closed individualism, each person possesses an identity that remains distinct from those of others and persists through physical and psychological changes. Under empty individualism, there is no single, enduring subject that remains numerically identical throughout a person's life; personal continuity instead consists of relations between successive physical or psychological states. Under open individualism, the subject of experience is not restricted by the boundaries separating individual organisms, experiences or periods of time.

Kolak distinguishes the individual organism, with its particular body and psychological history, from the subject of experience. He argues that the boundaries used to distinguish one organism from another do not necessarily establish boundaries between subjects. According to his account, a single subject can experience life through multiple organisms without those organisms sharing memories or being aware of one another's experiences.

He illustrates this distinction through an analogy involving oceans. Although different oceans are identified by geographical boundaries, they form an interconnected body of water. Kolak argues that the boundaries separating individual persons may similarly be useful for practical purposes without establishing fundamental differences in personal identity. He distinguishes the practical identification of individuals from the question of whether their apparent separation corresponds to a deeper metaphysical distinction.

Kolak also examines philosophical thought experiments involving the division and duplication of persons. He argues that cases in which a person's psychological or physical continuity branches into more than one individual need not entail the loss of personal identity. He contrasts this interpretation with accounts, including those associated with Derek Parfit, that question whether identity is necessary for survival. Kolak proposes that one subject could continue to exist through multiple individuals who subsequently have separate experiences.

=== Universalism ===
In "One Self: The Logic of Experience" (1990), Arnold Zuboff developed a related theory of personal identity that he calls "universalism". He argues that the apparent separation between conscious subjects arises from the limitations of individual experience rather than from an objective difference in the identity of the experiencer.

Zuboff uses thought experiments to examine assumptions about personal identity. In one example, two unconscious individuals gradually exchange the physical components of their bodies. He argues that no particular stage of the exchange establishes when one person becomes the other. He also considers split-brain cases, proposing that a single subject could experience separate fields of consciousness without either field containing awareness of the other.

In "An Introduction to Universalism", Zuboff describes the view as the claim that "all the experience in all the separate nervous systems of the world is yours", despite each experience appearing to constitute the entirety of one's consciousness.

Zuboff further developed his position in Finding Myself: Beyond the False Boundaries of Personal Identity (2025), which examines personal identity, subjective experience and the implications of universalism for understanding oneself and others.

== History ==
Kolak identified parallels to open individualism in earlier philosophical and religious traditions, including the Upanishads and the writings of Averroes. He also discussed related ideas expressed by physicists Erwin Schrödinger, Freeman Dyson and Fred Hoyle. These comparisons concern views of consciousness and the self that resemble aspects of open individualism, rather than a single philosophical doctrine shared by all these thinkers.

In Disturbing the Universe (1979), Dyson recalled developing an idea he called "Cosmic Unity" during his school years. He described believing that all human beings were the same person and that suffering inflicted on others was therefore also one's own suffering.

Zuboff presented his account of a single subject of experience in "One Self: The Logic of Experience" (1990). Kolak subsequently developed open individualism in I Am You (2004), distinguishing it from closed and empty individualism and relating it to questions about consciousness, personal identity and ethics.

== Philosophical criticism ==
In "Counting Subjects" (2008), philosopher Garrett Thomson examined Kolak's arguments for open individualism. Thomson argued that, although Kolak's analysis raises difficulties for conventional theories of personal identity, it does not establish that exactly one subject exists. He proposed that the subject of experience might instead be something to which the concept of numerical identity cannot meaningfully be applied.

Thomson compared Kolak's conception of the subject with Immanuel Kant's transcendental unity of apperception. He argued that the latter is a formal feature of experience rather than an independently existing object or substance. On this interpretation, the subject is not something that can be counted. Consequently, rejecting the existence of multiple separate subjects does not necessarily establish the existence of a single subject.

Thomson maintained that Kolak's conclusion depends on treating the subject as an entity, which he considered to require a less plausible interpretation of Kant's transcendental idealism. He proposed that a broadly Kantian account could accommodate aspects of Kolak's criticism of conventional theories of personal identity without accepting the claim that there is only one subject.

Thomson also questioned the ethical implications Kolak drew from his theory. He argued that individual beings could retain moral significance even if the existence of a single subject were accepted. Referring to the moral consideration owed to conscious nonhuman animals, he maintained that moral relevance need not depend on possessing the status of a person. He suggested that the interests of individual human beings and other conscious individuals might provide a basis for morality without requiring Kolak's conception of a universal subject.

== Ethical implications ==
Kolak developed open individualism partly as a foundation for an account of ethics in which the distinction between one's own interests and those of others loses its usual significance. If all conscious experiences belong to the same subject, he argues, benefits and harms experienced by different individuals ultimately concern that subject. On this account, the conventional division between self-interest and morality depends on an understanding of personal identity that Kolak rejects.

Kolak connects this position with utilitarianism, proposing what he calls "open utilitarianism". He argues that open individualism and Parfit's account of personal identity can both support utilitarian conclusions, although they approach the relationship between individuals differently. Whereas Parfit questions the depth of personal identity and the separateness of individual lives, Kolak maintains that the apparently separate lives belong to one subject.

Kolak argues that, under open individualism, morality and rational self-interest are not competing considerations. Because there are no ultimately separate subjects to whom obligations are owed, he proposes that questions ordinarily expressed in terms of moral duties should instead be understood through rational consideration of one's own interests, which include those experienced through other individuals.

He illustrates this position with a hypothetical case in which a person with considerable resources is asked to shelter an impoverished family. Kolak argues that their shared identity would not, by itself, establish an obligation to provide assistance. Rather, the appropriate decision would depend on the circumstances and on the rational assessment of the interests involved. His account therefore does not imply that identifying others as oneself automatically determines how resources should be distributed.

== Related ideas in fiction ==
In the science fiction novel October the First Is Too Late (1966), physicist and writer Fred Hoyle presents a theory comparing moments of experience to separate compartments through which consciousness moves. The novel considers the possibility that the same consciousness could experience different lives rather than belonging exclusively to one individual. Kolak subsequently identified Hoyle as one of the thinkers who had expressed ideas resembling open individualism.

== See also ==
- Reasons and Persons – 1984 book by Derek Parfit
- The View from Nowhere – 1986 philosophy book by Thomas Nagel
- Anattā
- Indefinite monism
- Monopsychism
- Nondualism
- Solipsism
- Teletransportation paradox
- Vertiginous question
