= Nominal identity =

Nominal identity is the identity in name only as opposed to the individual experience of that identity. The concept is often used in sociology, psychology and linguistics.

== Social sciences ==
Nominal identity is the category, label, or name with which one identifies or is identified (e.g., "Irish," "African-American," "gay," "straight," "male," "female", etc.). Whereas virtual identity is the experience of that identity: "The latter is, in a sense, what the name means; this is primarily a matter of its consequences for those who bear it, and can change while the nominal identity remains the same (and vice versa)."

Among those who self-identify as "gay," the term may not confer the same experience for two people or even between various geographical or cultural regions. Similarly, while one may talk about a "chair," "chair" itself can entail many forms, from arm chair to ladder back to even tree stump, if the experience of "chair" is something upon which a person sits.

Pierre Bourdieu uses the term nominal identity in Distinction: A Social Critique of the Judgment of Taste to mean both that which the identity of a subject is named and also where identity is an insignificant measurement or representation of the "perceived reality" of a subject or phenomenon. To further clarify, for Bourdieu nominal identity can often mean "face value" or "appearance." He often mentions the term nominal identity in order to illustrate the idea of a more complex reality, beyond the name, within the studied subject.

=== Nominal identity in ethnicity ===
Ethnic identity is a "social identity arising through group formation, individual identification with a group, and interaction between different ethnic groups."

Henry E. Brady and Cynthia S. Kaplan compiled a study called "Categorically Wrong? Nominal versus Graded Measures of Ethnic Identity" that takes a look at ethnicity as a nominal identity. Their study proposed whether or not "the attitudes of members of the group with the more salient identity can be completely explained by its nominal identity while the attitudes of the members of the group with less salient identity require a graded measure of ethnicity."

Brady and Kaplan focused on the country Estonia, where they posited two groups: "Estonians," and one that they call the "Slavs," a collective group of Russians, Ukrainians, or Belarusians. They chose this geographical area in particular because of the "centrality of ethnicity in the politics of transition in the USSR." Media usage (such as television, radio, or newspaper, whether it was the Estonia language Republic television or Russian-language media), individuals who identify themselves with another nationality, and the language used at home.

Brady and Kaplan concluded that "ethnicity is not always a nominal characteristic" for these two groups in Estonia. It is only nominal when most salient. "Ethnic identity ... causes individuals within a group to form their attitudes based upon their nominal identity". Individuals may generalize themselves in a certain category such as their nationality, but when it comes down to variables of different degrees in formulating their ethnicity, it is no longer nominal. It is their way of dividing themselves from a generalized name.

== Linguistics ==
Nominal identity in linguistics pertains to the identity of a word or group of words functioning as a noun or an adjective within a sentence's structure. Specifically, it relates to how one can look at a sentence and propose a different understanding of that sentence through the analysis of its identity defined in its lexical construct, such as in the example used by Chris Barker when discussing one of Manfred Krifka's study "Four thousand ships passed through the lock: Object-induced measure functions on events":

"(1) Four thousand ships passed through the lock last year."

On the surface, the proposition suggests that 4,000 distinct ships passed through the lock last year. However, as Krifka points out in his study, one could say that there were fewer than 4,000 distinct ships and that some of those ships passed through the lock more than once. Individuals reading this sentence could argue about the interpretation of this sentence. The outcome could be many interpretations when looking at the sentence more closely and determining what variables were taken into consideration when making this statement.
