= Teletransportation paradox =

Thought experiment on the philosophy of identity

The teletransportation paradox or teletransport paradox (also known in alternative forms as the duplicates paradox) is a thought experiment on philosophy of identity that challenges common intuitions on the nature of self and consciousness. It was formulated by Derek Parfit in his 1984 book Reasons and Persons. The thought experiment concerns the question of whether or not a person who undergoes teletransportation would be the same person afterwards.

== The paradox ==
Derek Parfit and others consider a hypothetical "teletransporter", a machine that puts a person to sleep, records their molecular/atomic composition and relays the recording to Mars at the speed of light. On Mars, another machine re-creates the person (from local stores of carbon, hydrogen, and so on), each atom in exactly the same relative position. Parfit poses the question of whether or not the teletransporter is actually a method of travel, or if it simply kills and makes an exact replica of the user.

Then the teletransporter is upgraded. The teletransporter on Earth is modified to not destroy the person who enters it, but instead it can simply make infinite replicas, all of whom would claim to remember entering the teletransporter on Earth in the first place.

Using thought experiments such as these, Parfit argues that any criteria we attempt to use to determine sameness of person will be lacking, because there is no further fact. What matters, to Parfit, is simply psychological connectedness ("Relation R"), including memory, personality, and so on.

Parfit continues this logic to establish a new context for morality and social control. He argues that it is morally wrong for one person to harm or interfere with another person and it is incumbent on society to protect individuals from such transgressions. If that is accepted, it can be further concluded that it is also incumbent on society to protect an individual's "Future Self" from such transgressions; tobacco use could be classified as an abuse of a Future Self's right to a healthy existence. Parfit resolves the logic to reach this conclusion, which appears to justify incursion into personal freedoms, but he does not explicitly endorse such invasive control.

== Older versions ==
The same thought experiment of teleportation to Mars and its effect on the person's consciousness appears in Daniel Dennett's introduction to the book The Mind's I. Elsewhere, that book's co-author Douglas Hofstadter, after describing the experiment itself, briefly discusses the question of whether Dennett and Parfit's versions of the story are a "clone" of one another or whether their pedigrees are independent, but does not ultimately come to a conclusion ("though [their independence] seems unlikely since The Mind's I is in Parfit's bibliography").

The Polish science-fiction writer Stanisław Lem described the same problem in the mid-twentieth century. He put it in writing in his philosophical text Dialogs in 1957. Similarly, in Lem's The Star Diaries ("Fourteenth Voyage") of 1957, the hero visits a planet and finds himself recreated from a backup record, after his death from a meteorite strike, which on this planet is a very commonplace procedure. In chapter 6 of his later discursive book "Summa Technologiae", first published in 1964, he discussed in detail the identity paradoxes associated with teleportation and hibernation of human beings.

He presents two teleporters in exactly the way Parfit did later and shows that it is not possible for a person to experience being teleported. The original person experiences everything up to the scan (if destructive) or through the scan and for however long the original lives (if non-destructive). The original never experiences being successfully teleported.

The copy has the memory of first being the original then continuing existence as the copy. If there are multiple copies, each has the same experience. Lem does not draw any conclusions as to whether any copy can claim to be a continuation of the original. He only says each copy would naturally make such a claim. This is the paradox: the original and the copy(ies) have different experiences, and from the viewpoint of the original, teleportation is unsuccessful.

Similar questions of identity were raised as early as 1775:

I would be glad to know your Lordship's opinion whether when my brain has lost its original structure, and when some hundred years after the same materials are fabricated so curiously as to become an intelligent being, whether, I say that being will be me; or, if, two or three such beings should be formed out of my brain; whether they will all be me, and consequently one and the same intelligent being.

— Thomas Reid letter to Lord Kames, 1775

== See also ==
- Altered Carbon
- Anatta, the Buddhist doctrine of the non-existence of the self
- "Heaven Sent" (Doctor Who)
- Infinity Pool (film)
- Mickey7 (novel)
- Mind uploading
- Moon (2009 film)
- Oblivion (2013 film)
- Open individualism
- The Prestige (film)
- Rogue Moon (novel)
- "Second Chances" (Star Trek: The Next Generation)
- Ship of Theseus
- Soma (video game)
- Stream of consciousness (psychology)
- Swampman, other thought experiment concerning personal identity
- Think Like a Dinosaur (short story)
- Timeline (novel)
- To Be (1990 film)
- Transporter (Star Trek)
- Vertiginous question
