= Stephen Kershnar =

American philosopher (born 1966)

- Born: 1966 (age 59–60)
- Education: Cornell University (BA); University of Pennsylvania Law School (JD); University of Nebraska–Lincoln (PhD)
- Occupations: Philosopher; professor; attorney

Stephen Kershnar (born 1966) is an American philosopher, a philosophy professor at the State University of New York at Fredonia (SUNY), and an attorney.

His research and works focus on applied ethics and political philosophy. Kershnar has written one hundred articles and book chapters on topics including abortion, adult–child sex, hell, most valuable player, pornography, punishment, sexual fantasies, slavery, and torture. He is the author of ten books, including Desert Collapses: Why No One Deserves Anything (2021), Total Collapse: The Case Against Morality and Responsibility (2018), and Abortion, Hell, and Shooting Abortion-Doctors: Does the Pro-Life Worldview Make Sense? (2017).

In 2022, Kershnar discussed his views and a book (published 2015) which question the immorality of "adult–child sex." His comments and the subsequent backlash led to the university barring him from campus pending an investigation, and him suing the university.

== Education and career ==
Kershnar completed a BA at Cornell University (1988), JD at Penn Law (1991), and PhD at the University of Nebraska–Lincoln (1995). In 2006, Kershnar was initially denied promotion to full professor, after he had criticized SUNY Fredonia's new policy regarding "student conduct policies and affirmative action practices". Thereafter, Kershnar was awarded tenure at SUNY Fredonia.

In early 2022, his arguments on "adult–child sex" in a philosophy podcast attracted criticism and led to him being barred from campus and teaching, pending an investigation. Kershnar has received support for his academic freedom in connection with this controversy from both the Academic Freedom Alliance and from FIRE (the Foundation for Individual Rights in Education). In June 2023, Kershnar filed a lawsuit against the Fredonia administration claiming violation of his First Amendment rights. An updated related news report about the incident and ongoing investigation was published in The New York Times on September 13, 2023. According to The New York Times, his comments occurred "as part of a wide-ranging thought experiment about ethics and consent", and he has stated that "adult–child sex" should be criminalized.

== Awards ==
Kershnar is recipient of various faculty awards, most notably:

- Chancellor's Award for Excellence in Teaching (2002)
- William T. and Charlotte N. Hagan Young Scholar/Artist Award (2003)
- Robert W. Kasling Lecture Award, for "Counterintuitive Morality" (2008)
- Chancellor's Award for Excellence in Scholarship and Creative Activities (2010–2011)

== Books ==
As of February 2022, Kershnar has published 12 books:

- Desert, Retribution and Torture (2001).
- Sex, Discrimination, and Violence: Surprising and Unpopular Results in Applied Ethics (2009).
- Desert and Virtue: A Theory of Intrinsic Value (2010).
- For Torture: A Rights-based Defence (2012).
- Justice for the Past (2012).
- Gratitude toward Veterans: Why Americans Should Not Be Very Grateful to Veterans (2014).
- Pedophilia and Adult–Child Sex: A Philosophical Analysis (2015).
- Does the Pro-Life Worldview Make Sense?: Abortion, Hell, and Violence Against Abortion Doctors (2017).
- Total Collapse: The Case Against Responsibility and Morality (2018).
