= Personal horizon =

Philosophical concept by J. J. Valberg

Personal horizon is a concept developed by J. J. Valberg in his book Dream, Death and the Self. He attempts to bring out his subject-matter by considering the dream hypothesis – what if this were a dream? In Valberg's view, an undetermined horizon would necessarily be internalised (a.k.a. subconscious) if this were all a dream. This leads to "horizonal" conceptions of consciousness, mind, experience, life, the self, etc. Valberg subsequently considers death, and argues that when the meaning of death strikes us in the right way, it presents us with the prospect of nothingness – not there being nothing for me, but nothing period. This corresponds to one's personal horizon being the pre-eminent one, corresponding to a weak version of solipsism (arguably closely related to Hare's egocentric presentism). Valberg points out the difficulty of reconciling this with his commitment to the view that he shares the world with metaphysical equals; he continues by re-evaluating many well-studied problems in philosophy in light of this notion of the personal horizon.

Mark Johnston compares this notion to his related but distinct notion of an "arena of presence and action", which contains the stream of consciousness, and argues for the latter.

== See also ==
- Metaphysical subjectivism
- Centered worlds
- Benj Hellie's vertiginous question
