= Hitoshi Nagai =

Japanese philosopher (born 1951)

- Born: November 10, 1951 (age 74)

Philosophical work
- Era: 20th / 21st-century philosophy
- Region: Western & Eastern Philosophy
- School: Continental Philosophy, Analytic Philosophy,
- Main interests: metaphysics, ethics
- Notable ideas: solipsity, solipsistic I!

Hitoshi Nagai (永井 均, Nagai Hitoshi; born November 10, 1951) is one of the most influential Japanese philosophers, who taught philosophy at Chiba University and later at Nihon University. His main research fields are metaphysics and metaethics. His books include "Philosophy for Kids!" and "A Transfer Student and Black Jack: A Seminar on Solipsity," which interpret solipsism from a unique metaphysical point of view. Nagai's philosophy has been heavily influenced by Wittgenstein, however, his philosophy successfully elucidates an important aspect of solipsism which Wittgenstein could not fully express in his philosophical works. Nagai stresses that the solipsistic subject (such as "I!") can be pointed to by using the public language, but the trial of this pointing ought to be failed every time because of the unique function of our public language. He calls this characteristic "solipsity".

== Books (Japanese, incomplete) ==
- A Metaphysics of I!,『〈私〉のメタフィジックス』 Keiso Shobo, 1986.
- The Attitude Towards the Soul,『〈魂〉に対する態度』 Keiso Shobo, 1991.
- An Introduction to Wittgenstein,『ウィトゲンシュタイン入門』 Chikuma Shobo, 1995.
- Philosophy for Kids!,『〈子ども〉のための哲学』 Kodansha, 1996.
- The Philosophy of Ressentiment,『ルサンチマンの哲学』 Kawade Shobo, 1997.
- The Incomparability of the Existence of I!,『〈私〉の存在の比類なさ』 Keiso Shobo, 1998.
- This Is Nietzsche,『これがニーチェだ』 Kodansha, 1998.
- Manga Philosophizes,『マンガは哲学する』 Kodansha, 2000.
- A Transfer Student and Black Jack: A Seminar on Solipsity,『転校生とブラック・ジャック——独在性をめぐるセミナー』 Iwanami Shoten, 2001.
- What Is Ethics?,『倫理とは何か——猫のアインジヒトの挑戦』 Sangyo Tosho, 2002.
- I, Now, and God: Philosophy of the Opening,『私・今・そして神——開闢の哲学』 Kodansha, 2004.
- Why Isn't Consciousness Real?, 『なぜ意識は実在しないのか』Iwanami Shoten, 2007.
- The Philosophy of Kitaro Nishida,『西田幾多郎——「絶対無」とは何か』 NHK, 2007.
- Wittgenstein's Misdiagnosis,『ヴィトゲンシュタインの誤診—『青色本』を掘り崩す』 Nakanishiya Shuppan, 2012.
- A Secret Battle of Philosophy,『哲学の密かな闘い』 Pneuma Sha, 2013.
- A Lively Murmur of Philosophy,『哲学の賑やかな呟き』 Pneuma Sha, 2013.
- Uncle Tetsu and Manabu,『哲おじさんと学くん』 Nihon-Keizai-Shinbun Shuppan Sha, 2014.
- Being and time - philosophical investigations 1, 『存在と時間 哲学探求1』 Bungei Shunju 2016
- The "Solipsitic" Structure of Being - philosophical investigations 2, 『世界の独在論的存在構造 哲学探究2』 Shunjusha 2018

== Selected English papers ==
- The Opening: A Philosophy of Actuality (1) Philosophia Osaka No. 2, 2007:45-61 PDF
- The Opening: A Philosophy of Actuality (2) Philosophia Osaka No. 3, 2008:1-24 PDF
- The Opening: A Philosophy of Actuality (3) Philosophia Osaka No. 4, 2009:1-29 PDF
- The Opening: A Philosophy of Actuality (4) Philosophia Osaka No. 5, 2010:23-40 PDF
- Why Isn't Consciousness Real? (1) Philosophia Osaka No. 6, 2011:41-61 PDF
- Why Isn't Consciousness Real? (2) Philosophia Osaka No. 7, 2012:47-63 PDF
- Why Isn't Consciousness Real? (3) Philosophia Osaka No. 8, 2013:37-51 PDF
- Why Isn't Consciousness Real? (4) Philosophia Osaka No. 9, 2014:41-60 PDF
