= Herbert Spiegelberg =

American philosopher (1904–1990)

- Born: May 18, 1904; Straßburg, Alsace-Lorraine, German Empire
- Died: September 6, 1990 (aged 86); St. Louis, Missouri

Philosophical work
- Era: 20th-century philosophy
- Region: Continental philosophy
- School: Phenomenology
- Main interests: Contemporary continental philosophy, history of ideas, ethics, phenomenological psychology

Herbert Spiegelberg (May 18, 1904 – September 6, 1990) was an American philosopher who played a prominent role in the advancement of phenomenogical philosophy in the United States.

== Life ==
Spiegelberg was born in Strasbourg, in the Alsatian region of northeastern France. He studied at Heidelberg University, the University of Freiburg, and the Ludwig-Maximilians-Universität München, where he encountered Edmund Husserl and many others in the vanguard of the European phenomenological movement. He received his Ph.D. in 1928 from the Ludwig-Maximilians-Universität München. His doctoral dissertation was written under the direction of the phenomenologist Alexander Pfänder and was titled Gesetz und Sittengesetz (Law and Morality).

In 1937, Spiegelberg left the continent and studied for a year in England before immigrating to the United States. In the U.S., he taught first at Swarthmore College and then at Lawrence University, which later awarded him an honorary doctoral degree.

From 1953 to 1954 and from 1955 to 1956, he received grants from the Rockefeller Foundation for the preparation of the first edition of his landmark historical survey, The Phenomenological Movement: A Historical Introduction.

In 1963, he relocated to Washington University in St. Louis, Missouri and remained there until his retirement as Emeritus Professor in 1971. He also served as visiting professor at the universities of Michigan and Southern California and as Fulbright Lecturer at the Ludwig-Maximilians-Universität München.

Spiegelberg conducted five influential workshops in phenomenology, during the summers of 1965, 1966, 1967, 1969, and 1972. The first workshop was supported by a grant from the National Science Foundation and the second by a grant from the Monsanto Company.

In 1981, Washington University established a series of lectures in phenomenology in his honor. Herbert Spiegelberg died of leukemia, at the age of 86, at his home in St. Louis, Missouri. His collected papers are available in the archives of the Washington University Libraries.

== Philosophy ==
Spiegelberg played a major role in promoting the study of development of human consciousness and self-awareness, phenomenology, in America.

== Works ==
=== Books ===
- The Socratic enigma; a collection of testimonies through twenty-four centuries. edited, with an introduction by Herbert Spiegelberg, in collaboration with Bayard Quincy Morgan. Indianapolis: Bobbs-Merrill. 1964.
- The Phenomenological Movement: A Historical Introduction. The Hague: Nijhoff. 1960. (2 vols)
  - 2nd edition. The Hague: Nijhoff. 1965. (2 vols)
  - 3rd edition. with the collaboration of Karl Schuhmann. The Hague: Nijhoff. 1982. 768 pages. ISBN 90-247-2535-6
- Phenomenology in psychology and psychiatry; a historical introduction. Evanston, Illinois: Northwestern University Press. 1972. 411 pages. ISBN 0-8101-0357-5
- Doing Phenomenology: Essays On And In Phenomenology. The Hague: Nijhoff. 1975. 290 pages. ISBN 90-247-1725-6
- The Context Of The Phenomenological Movement. The Hague: Nijhoff. 1981. 239 pages.
- Steppingstones Toward an Ethics for Fellow Existers: Essays 1944-1983. The Hague: Nijhoff. 1986. 337 pages. ISBN 90-247-2963-7

=== Translations ===
- Pfänder, Alexander (1967). Phenomenology of willing and motivation and other phaenomenologica. translated, with an introduction and supplementary essays by Herbert Spiegelberg. Evanston, Illinois: Northwestern University Press. 98 pages

=== Papers ===
- "The Puzzle of Ludwig Wittgenstein's "Phänomenologie" (1929-?)", American Philosophical Quarterly, Volume 5, Issue 4, 1968, pp. 244-256.
- "Augustine in Wittgenstein: A Case Study in Philosophical Stimulation", Journal of the History of Philosophy, Volume 17, Number 3, July 1979, pp. 319-327.
- "Wittgenstein Calls his Philosophy “Phenomenology”: One more Supplement to “The Puzzle of Wittgenstein's ‘Phänomenologie’”", Journal of the British Society for Phenomenology, Volume 13, Issue 3, 1982, pp. 296–299.

== Secondary sources ==
- Phenomenological Perspectives: Historical And Systematic Essays In Honor Of Herbert Spiegelberg. The Hague: Nijhoff. 1975. 279 pages. ISBN 90-247-1701-9
