= J. J. Valberg =

American-British philosopher (born 1936)

Jerome J. Valberg (born 1936) is a retired American-British philosopher, and former Senior Lecturer of Philosophy at University College London.

In 1966, Valberg received his doctorate from the University of Chicago with his dissertation, "Agency: Some Metaphysical Questions Concerning Human Action".

Primarily working in the fields of epistemology and metaphysics, Valberg's writings are also concerned with consciousness, identity, and the problems of perception.

Valberg's notable ideas include the personal horizon concept.

He is the author of Dream, Death, and the Self and The Puzzle of Experience. He lives in London.
