= The View from Nowhere =

1986 philosophy book by Thomas Nagel

- Author: Thomas Nagel
- Language: English
- Genre: Philosophy
- Publisher: Oxford University Press
- Publication date: 1986

The View from Nowhere is a book by philosopher Thomas Nagel. Published by Oxford University Press in 1986, it contrasts passive and active points of view in how humanity interacts with the world, relying either on a subjective perspective that reflects a point of view or an objective perspective that takes a more detached perspective. Nagel describes the objective perspective as the "view from nowhere", one where the only valuable ideas are ones derived independently.

== Reception ==
Historian Peter Gay praised The View from Nowhere. Philosopher Thomas Metzinger praised and criticized the book's central concept as "beautiful" but untenable.
