= Moving spotlight theory of time =

Theory of time

The moving spotlight theory of time is a theory of time which says that the complete history of the world exists (in much the same sense as the block universe, that is, past, present, and future all exist), but that there is an absolute, objective present moment. On this view, what is present really changes as time passes. This is a "moving spotlight" theory because the objective present "moves" through the block analogous to how a spotlight might traverse (e.g.) a row of houses in a street. This view is suggested, though not endorsed, by C.D. Broad in his Scientific Thought (1923). (Broad endorses the growing block theory of time, though this view can trace it roots further back to Samuel Alexander.)

Moving spotlight theory and growing block theory are both taken as intermediary positions between either presentism and eternalism, or the A-theory and B-theory of time. It is common to see the moving spotlight theory described as a "non-presentist A-theory." The moving spotlight theory accepts the dynamic thesis of the A-theory that time really passes, what is objectively present changes, and accepts the static ontology of the B-theory that past, present, and future entities exist: the totality of what exists does not change.

According to Ross Cameron and Daniel Deasy, the label "moving spotlight theory" encompasses at least three distinct views in the contemporary debate in the philosophy of time: the traditional moving spotlight theory, due to Broad, which can be understood as an enriched B-theory of time; permanentist propositional temporalism, due to Meghan Sullivan and Deasy, which combines permanentism (always, everything always exists) and temporalism, the view that propositions can change truth-values over time; and, a form of enriched presentism, due to Cameron. Other variations of the theory have been put forward.

The moving spotlight theory can be extended to cover not only the distinction between one time and another, but also the distinction between one consciousness and another. A variant of this theory is a principal component of the plot of Fred Hoyle's novel October the First Is Too Late, which combines the idea of the moving spotlight with open individualism.
