= A series and B series =

Philosophical descriptions of the temporal ordering of events

In metaphysics, the A series and the B series are two different descriptions of the temporal ordering relation among events. The two series differ principally in their use of tense to describe the temporal relation between events and the resulting ontological implications regarding time.

John McTaggart introduced these terms in 1908, in an argument for the unreality of time. They are now commonly used by contemporary philosophers of time.

== History ==
Metaphysical debate about temporal orderings reaches back to the ancient Greek philosophers Heraclitus and Parmenides. Parmenides thought that reality is timeless and unchanging. Heraclitus, in contrast, believed that the world is a process of ceaseless change, flux and decay. Reality for Heraclitus is dynamic and ephemeral, in a state of constant flux, as in his famous statement that it is impossible to step twice into the same river (since the river is flowing).

== McTaggart's series ==
McTaggart distinguished the ancient conceptions as a set of relations. According to McTaggart, there are two distinct modes in which all events can be ordered in time.

=== A series ===
In the first mode (the A series of temporal positions), events are ordered as future, present, and past. Futurity and pastness allow for degrees, while the present does not. When we speak of time in this way, we are speaking in terms of a series of positions which run from the remote past through the recent past to the present, and from the present through the near future all the way to the remote future. The essential characteristic of this descriptive modality is McTaggartian change: the continual transformation of an event's position within the series of temporal positions, whereby the event is first future, then present, and then past. In this sense, change is understood as temporal passage itself, through which events acquire and lose the determinations of futurity, presentness, and pastness. Moreover, assertions made according to this modality correspond to the temporal perspective of the person who utters them. This is the A series of temporal positions.

Although originally McTaggart defined tenses as relational qualities, i.e., qualities that events possess by standing in a certain relation to something outside of time (that does not change its position in time), today it is popularly believed that he treated tenses as monadic properties. Later philosophers have independently inferred that McTaggart must have understood tense as monadic because English tenses are normally expressed by the non-relational singular predicates "is past", "is present" and "is future", as noted by R. D. Ingthorsson.

=== B series ===
From a second point of view (the B series of temporal positions), events can be ordered according to a different series of temporal positions by way of two-term relations that are asymmetric, irreflexive and transitive (forming a strict partial order): "earlier than" (or precedes) and "later than" (or follows).

An important difference between the two series is that while events continuously change their position in the A series, their position in the B series does not. If an event is ever earlier than some events and later than the rest, it is always earlier than and later than those very events. Furthermore, while events acquire their A-series determinations through a relation to something outside of time, their B-series determinations hold between the events that constitute the B series. This is the B series, and the philosophy that says all truths about time can be reduced to B series statements is the B-theory of time.

=== Distinctions ===
The logic and the linguistic expression of the two series are radically different. The A series is tensed and the B series is tenseless. For example, the assertion "it is raining here today" is a tensed assertion because it depends on the temporal perspective—the present—of the person who utters it, while the assertion "It rained here on 6 May 2026" is tenseless because it does not so depend. From the point of view of their truth-values, the two propositions are identical (both true or both false) if the first assertion is made on 6 May 2026. The non-temporal relation of precedence between two events, say "E precedes F", does not change over time (excluding from this discussion the issue of the relativity of temporal order of causally disconnected events in the theory of relativity). On the other hand, the character of being "past, present or future" of the events "E" or "F" does change with time. In the image of McTaggart the passage of time consists in the fact that terms ever further in the future pass into the present...or that the present advances toward terms ever farther in the future. If we assume the first point of view, we speak as if the B series slides along a fixed A series. If we assume the second point of view, we speak as if the A series slides along a fixed B series.

== Relation to other ideas in the philosophy of time ==
There are two principal varieties of the A-theory, presentism and the growing block universe. Both assume an objective present, but presentism assumes that only present objects exist, while the growing block universe assumes both present and past objects exist, but not future ones. Views that assume no objective present and are therefore versions of the B-theory include eternalism and four-dimensionalism.

Vincent Conitzer argues that A-theory is related to Benj Hellie's vertiginous question and Caspar Hare's ideas of egocentric presentism and perspectival realism. He argues that A-theory being true and "now" being metaphysically distinguished from other moments of time implies that the "I" is also metaphysically distinguished from other first-person perspectives.

== See also ==
- Endurantism
- New riddle of induction
- Perdurantism
