= Future =

Time after the present

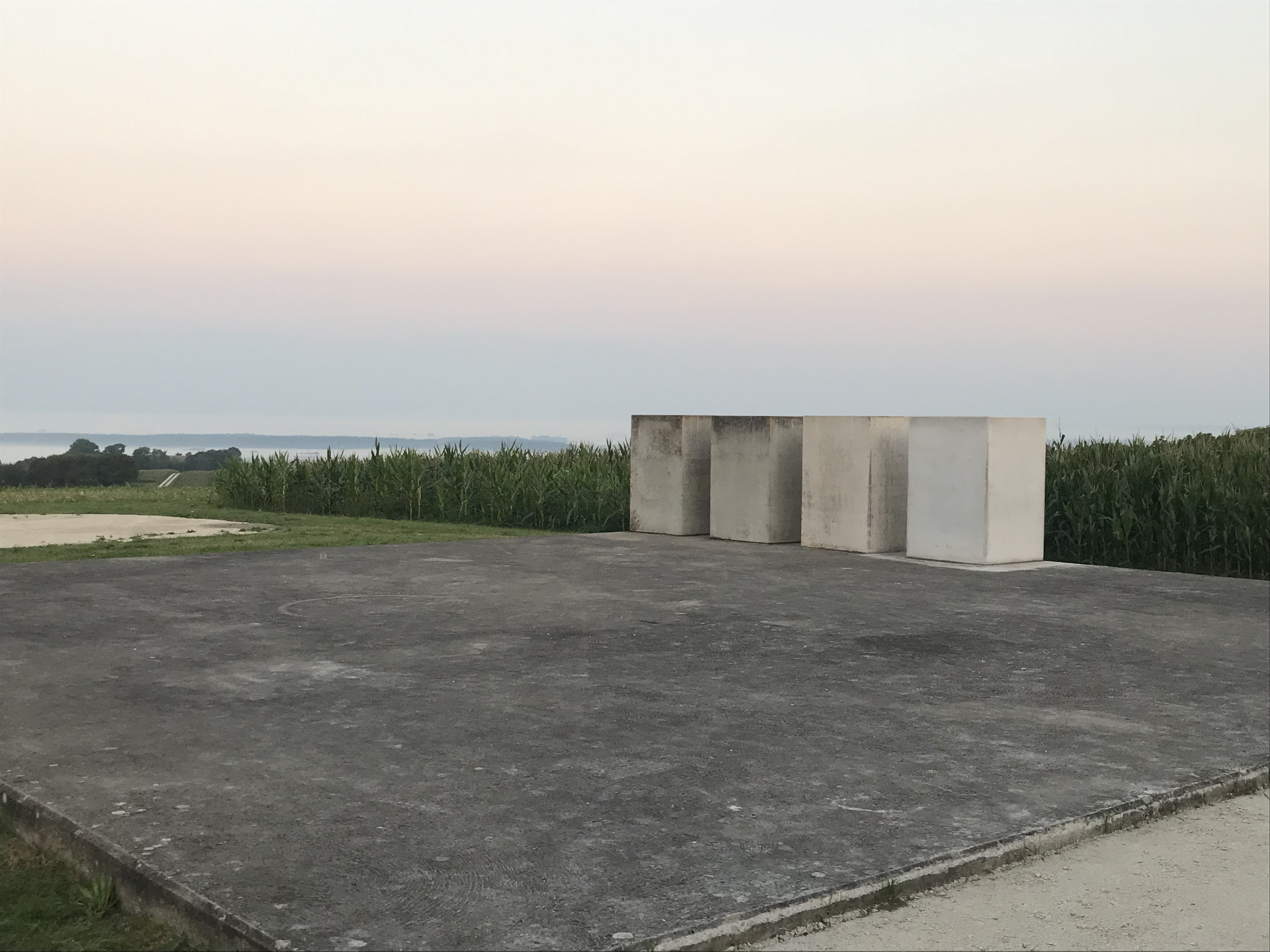
The Zeitpyramide, pictured in 2023, is an unfinished concrete pyramid. Because a block is only placed every 10 years, it is expected to be completed in 3183.

The future is the time after the past and the present. Its arrival is considered inevitable due to the existence of time and the laws of physics. Due to the apparent nature of the reality and the unavoidability of the future, everything that currently exists and will exist can be categorized as either permanent, meaning that it will exist forever, or temporary, meaning that it will end. In the Occidental view, which uses a linear conception of time, the future is the portion of the projected timeline that is anticipated to occur. In special relativity, the future is considered absolute future, or the future light cone.

In the philosophy of time, presentism is the belief that only the present exists and the future and the past are unreal. Religions consider the future when they address issues such as karma, life after death, and eschatologies that study what the end of time and the end of the world will be. Religious figures such as prophets and diviners have claimed to see into the future. Future studies, or futurology, is the science, art, and practice of postulating possible futures. Modern practitioners stress the importance of alternative and plural futures, rather than one monolithic future, and the limitations of prediction and probability, versus the creation of possible and preferable futures. Predeterminism is the belief that the past, present, and future have already been decided.

The concept of the future has been explored extensively in cultural production, including art movements and genres devoted entirely to its elucidation, such as the 20th-century movement futurism.

== In physics ==
A visualization of the future light cone (at the top), the present, and the past light cone in 2D space

In physics, time is the fourth dimension. Physicists argue that spacetime can be understood as a sort of stretchy fabric that bends due to forces such as gravity. In classical physics the future is just a half of the timeline, which is the same for all observers. In special relativity the flow of time is relative to the observer's frame of reference. The faster an observer is traveling away from a reference object, the slower that object seems to move through time. Hence, the future is not an objective notion anymore. A more modern notion is absolute future, or the future light cone. While a person can move backward or forwards in the three spatial dimensions, many physicists argue one may only move forward in time.

In theory, time dilation, a consequence of special relativity, would make it possible for passengers in a fast-moving vehicle to advance into the future in a short period of their own time. With sufficiently high speeds, the effect would be dramatic. For example, one year of travel might correspond to ten years on Earth. Indeed, a constant 1 g acceleration would permit humans to travel through the entire known Universe in one human lifetime.

Some physicists claim that by using a wormhole to connect two regions of spacetime a person could theoretically travel in time. Physicist Michio Kaku points out that to power this hypothetical time machine and "punch a hole into the fabric of space-time" would require the energy of a star. Another theory is that a person could travel in time with cosmic strings.

== In philosophy ==
In the philosophy of time, presentism is the belief that only the present exists, and the future and past are unreal. Past and future "entities" are construed as logical constructions or fictions. The opposite of presentism is 'eternalism', which is the belief that things in the past and things yet to come exist eternally. Another view (not held by many philosophers) is sometimes called the 'growing block' theory of time—which postulates that the past and present exist, but the future does not.

Presentism is compatible with Galilean relativity, in which time is independent of space, but is probably incompatible with Lorentzian/Albert Einsteinian relativity in conjunction with certain other philosophical theses that many find uncontroversial. Saint Augustine proposed that the present is a knife edge between the past and the future and could not contain any extended period of time.

Contrary to Saint Augustine, some philosophers propose that conscious experience is extended in time. For instance, William James said that time is "...the short duration of which we are immediately and incessantly sensible." Augustine proposed that God is outside of time and present for all times, in eternity. Other early philosophers who were presentists include the Buddhists (in the tradition of Indian Buddhism). A leading scholar from the modern era on Buddhist philosophy is Stcherbatsky, who has written extensively on Buddhist presentism:

Everything past is unreal, everything future is unreal, everything imagined, absent, mental... is unreal... Ultimately real is only the present moment of physical efficiency [i.e., causation].

== In psychology ==
Human behavior is known to encompass anticipation of the future. Anticipatory behavior can be the result of a psychological outlook toward the future, for examples optimism, pessimism, and hope.

Optimism is an outlook on life such that one maintains a view of the world as a positive place. People would say that optimism is seeing the glass "half full" of water as opposed to half empty. It is the philosophical opposite of pessimism. Optimists generally believe that people and events are inherently good, so that most situations work out in the end for the best. Hope is a belief in a positive outcome related to events and circumstances in one's life. Hope implies a certain amount of despair, wanting, wishing, suffering or perseverance—i.e., believing that a better or positive outcome is possible even when there is some evidence to the contrary. "Hopefulness" is somewhat different from optimism in that hope is an emotional state, whereas some theories point to optimism as a conclusion reached through a deliberate thought pattern that leads to a positive personal attitudes and by extension is linked to more philanthropic behaviours.

Pessimism as stated before is the opposite of optimism; it is the tendency to see, anticipate, or emphasize only bad or undesirable outcomes, results, or problems. The word originates in Latin from Pessimus meaning worst and Malus meaning bad and has a link to misanthropic belief systems.

== In religion ==
Religions consider the future when they address issues such as karma, life after death, and eschatologies which consider what the end of time and the end of the world will be like. In religion, major prophets are said to have the power to change the future. Common religious figures have claimed to see into the future, such as minor prophets and diviners.

The term "afterlife" refers to the continuation of existence of the soul, spirit or mind of a human (or animal) after physical death, typically in a spiritual or ghostlike afterworld. Deceased persons are usually believed to go to a specific region or plane of existence in this afterworld, often depending on the rightness of their actions during life.

Some believe the afterlife includes some form of preparation for the soul to transfer to another body (reincarnation). The major views on the afterlife derive from religion, esotericism and metaphysics. There are those who are skeptical of the existence of the afterlife, or believe that it is absolutely impossible, such as the materialist-reductionists, who believe that the topic is supernatural, therefore does not really exist or is unknowable. In metaphysical models, theists generally, believe some sort of afterlife awaits people when they die. Atheists generally do not believe in a life after death. Members of some generally non-theistic religions such as Buddhism, tend to believe in an afterlife like reincarnation but without reference to God.

Agnostics generally hold the position that like the existence of God, the existence of supernatural phenomena, such as souls or life after death, is unverifiable and therefore unknowable. Many religions, whether they believe in the soul's existence in another world like Christianity, Islam and many pagan belief systems, or in reincarnation like many forms of Hinduism and Buddhism, believe that one's status in the afterlife is a reward or punishment for their conduct during life, with the exception of Calvinistic variants of Protestant Christianity, which believe one's status in the afterlife is a gift from God and cannot be earned during life.

Eschatology is a part of theology and philosophy concerned with the final events in the Human history, or the ultimate destiny of humanity, commonly referred to as the end of the world. While in mysticism the phrase refers metaphorically to the end of ordinary reality and reunion with the Divine, in many traditional religions it is taught as an actual future event prophesied in sacred texts or folklore. More broadly, eschatology may encompass related concepts such as the Messiah or Messianic Age, the end time, and the end of days.

== In grammar ==
In English grammar, actions are classified according to one of the following twelve verb tenses: past (past, past continuous, past perfect, or past perfect continuous), present (present, present continuous, present perfect, or present perfect continuous), or future (future, future continuous, future perfect, or future perfect continuous). The future tense refers to actions that have not yet happened, but which are due, expected, or may occur in the future. For example, in the sentence, "She will walk home," the verb "will walk" is in the future tense because it refers to an action that is going to, or may, happen at a point in time beyond the present.

Verbs in the future continuous tense indicate actions that will happen beyond the present and will continue for a period of time. In the sentence, "She will be walking home," the verb phrase "will be walking" is in the future continuous tense because the action described is not happening now, but will happen sometime afterwards and is expected to continue happening for some time. Verbs in the future perfect tense indicate actions that will be completed at a particular point in the future. For example, the verb phrase, "will have walked," in the sentence, "She will have walked home," is in the future perfect tense because it refers to an action that is completed as of a specific time in the future. Finally, verbs in the future perfect continuous tense combine the features of the perfect and continuous tenses, describing the future status of actions that have been happening continually from now, the past or some time in the future through to a particular time (later) in the future. In the sentence, "She will have been walking home," the verb phrase "will have been walking" is in the future perfect continuous tense because it refers to an action that the speaker anticipates will have continued until some time in the future.

Another way to think of the various future tenses is that actions described by the future tense will be completed at an unspecified time in the future, actions described by the future continuous tense will keep happening in the future, actions described by the future perfect tense will be completed at a specific time in the future, and actions described by the future perfect continuous tense are expected to be continuing as of a specific time in the future.

== Linear and cyclic culture ==
"The trouble with the future is that it's so much less knowable than the past."

— John Lewis Gaddis, The Landscape of History.

The linear view of time (common in Western thought) draws a stronger distinction between past and future than does the more common cyclic time of cultures such as India, where past and future can coalesce much more readily.

== Futures studies ==
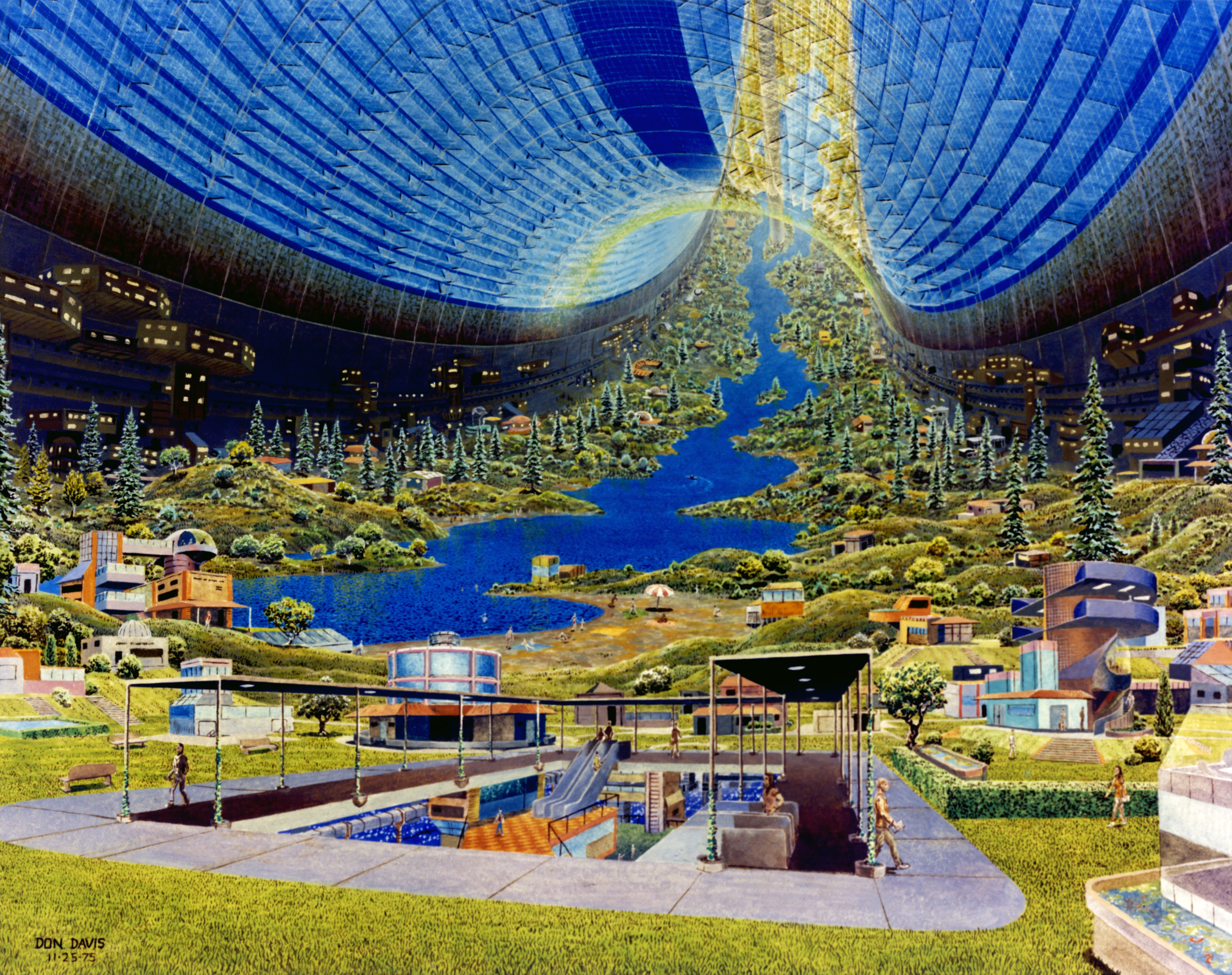
Project of an orbital colony Stanford torus, painted by Donald E. Davis

Futures studies or futurology is the science, art, and practice of postulating possible, probable, and preferable futures and the worldviews and myths that underlie them. Futures studies seek to understand what is likely to continue, what is likely to change, and what is novel. Part of the discipline thus seeks a systematic and pattern-based understanding of past and present, and to determine the likelihood of future events and trends. A key part of this process is understanding the potential future impact of decisions made by individuals, organizations, and governments. Leaders use the results of such work to assist in decision-making.

Take hold of the future or the future will take hold of you.

— Patrick Dixon, author of Futurewise

Futures is an interdisciplinary field, studying yesterday's and today's changes, and aggregating and analyzing both lay and professional strategies, and opinions with respect to tomorrow. It includes analyzing the sources, patterns, and causes of change and stability in the attempt to develop foresight and to map possible futures. Modern practitioners stress the importance of alternative and plural futures, rather than one monolithic future, and the limitations of prediction and probability, versus the creation of possible and preferable futures.

Three factors usually distinguish futures studies from the research conducted by other disciplines (although all disciplines overlap, to differing degrees). First, futures studies often examines not only possible but also probable, preferable, and "wild card" futures. Second, futures studies typically attempts to gain a holistic or systemic view based on insights from a range of different disciplines. Third, futures studies challenges and unpacks the assumptions behind dominant and contending views of the future. The future thus is not empty but fraught with hidden assumptions.

Futures studies do not generally include the work of economists who forecast movements of interest rates over the next business cycle, or of managers or investors with short-term time horizons. Most strategic planning, which develops operational plans for preferred futures with time horizons of one to three years, is also not considered futures. But plans and strategies with longer time horizons that specifically attempt to anticipate and be robust to possible future events, are part of a major subdiscipline of futures studies called strategic foresight.

The futures field also excludes those who make future predictions through professed supernatural means. At the same time, it does seek to understand the model's such groups use and the interpretations they give to these models.

=== Forecasting ===
Forecasting is the process of estimating outcomes in uncontrolled situations. Forecasting is applied in many areas, such as weather forecasting, earthquake prediction, transport planning, and labour market planning. Due to the element of the unknown, risk and uncertainty are central to forecasting.

Statistically based forecasting employs time series with cross-sectional or longitudinal data. Econometric forecasting methods use the assumption that it is possible to identify the underlying factors that might influence the variable that is being forecast. If the causes are understood, projections of the influencing variables can be made and used in the forecast. Judgmental forecasting methods incorporate intuitive judgments, opinions, and probability estimates, as in the case of the Delphi method, scenario building, and simulations.

Prediction is similar to forecasting but is used more generally, for instance, to also include baseless claims on the future. Organized efforts to predict the future began with practices like astrology, haruspicy, and augury. These are all considered to be pseudoscience today, evolving from the human desire to know the future in advance.

Modern efforts such as futures studies attempt to predict technological and societal trends, while more ancient practices, such as weather forecasting, have benefited from scientific and causal modelling. Despite the development of cognitive instruments for the comprehension of future, the stochastic and chaotic nature of many natural and social processes has made precise forecasting of the future elusive.

== In art and culture ==
=== Futurism ===
Futurism as an art movement originated in Italy at the beginning of the 20th century. It developed largely in Italy and in Russia, although it also had adherents in other countries—in England and Portugal for example. The Futurists explored every medium of art, including painting, sculpture, poetry, theatre, music, architecture, and even gastronomy. Futurists had passionate loathing of ideas from the past, especially political and artistic traditions. They also espoused a love of speed, technology, and violence. Futurists dubbed the love of the past passéisme. The car, the plane, and the industrial town were all legendary for the Futurists because they represented the technological triumph of people over nature. The Futurist Manifesto of 1909 declared: "We will glorify war—the world's only hygiene—militarism, patriotism, the destructive gesture of freedom-bringers, beautiful ideas worth dying for, and scorn for woman." Though it owed much of its character and some of its ideas to radical political movements, it had little involvement in politics until the autumn of 1913.

Futurism in Classical Music arose during this same time period. Closely identified with the central Italian Futurist movement were brother composers Luigi Russolo (1885–1947) and Antonio Russolo (1877–1942), who used instruments known as intonarumori—essentially sound boxes used to create music out of noise. Luigi Russolo's futurist manifesto, "The Art of Noises", is considered one of the most important and influential texts in 20th-century musical aesthetics. Other examples of futurist music include Arthur Honegger's "Pacific 231" (1923), which imitates the sound of a steam locomotive, Prokofiev's "The Steel Step" (1926), Alexander Mosolov's "Iron Foundry" (1927), and the experiments of Edgard Varèse.

Literary futurism made its debut with F.T. Marinetti's Manifesto of Futurism (1909). Futurist poetry used unexpected combinations of images and hyper-conciseness (not to be confused with the actual length of the poem). Futurist theater works have scenes a few sentences long, use nonsensical humor, and try to discredit the deep-rooted dramatic traditions with parody. Longer literature forms, such as novels, had no place in the Futurist aesthetic, which had an obsession with speed and compression.

Futurism expanded to encompass other artistic domains and ultimately included painting, sculpture, ceramics, graphic design, industrial design, interior design, theatre design, textiles, drama, literature, music and architecture. In architecture, it featured a distinctive thrust towards rationalism and modernism through the use of advanced building materials. The ideals of futurism remain as significant components of modern Western culture; the emphasis on youth, speed, power and technology finding expression in much of modern commercial cinema and commercial culture. Futurism has produced several reactions, including the 1980s-era literary genre of cyberpunk—which often treated technology with a critical eye.

=== Science fiction ===
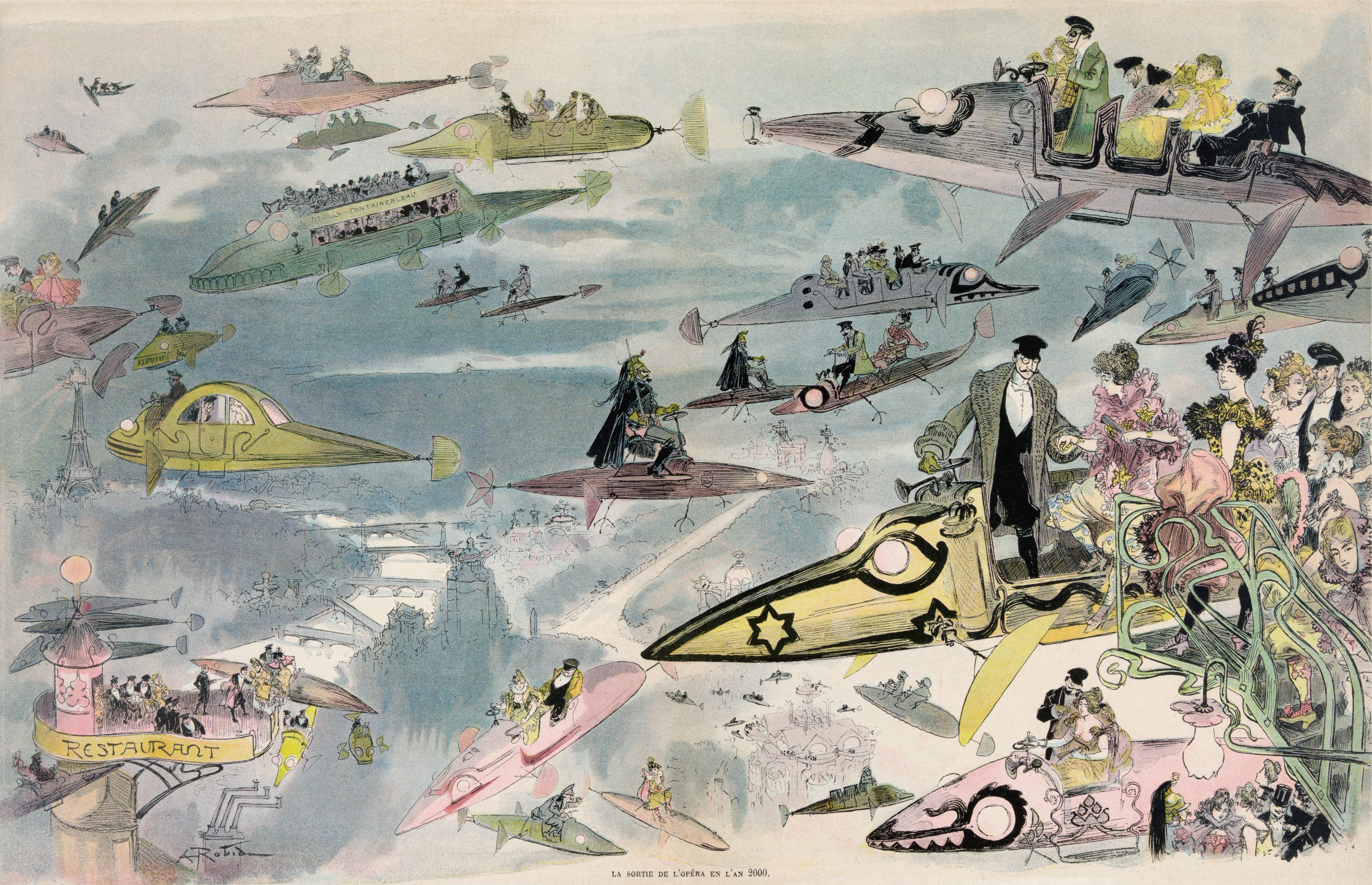
Print (c. 1902) by Albert Robida showing a futuristic view of air travel over Paris in the year 2000 as people leave the opera

More generally, one can regard science fiction as a broad genre of fiction that often involves speculations based on current or future science or technology. Science fiction is found in books, art, television, films, games, theater, and other media. Science fiction differs from fantasy in that, within the context of the story, its imaginary elements are largely possible within scientifically established or scientifically postulated laws of nature (though some elements in a story might still be pure imaginative speculation). Settings may include the future, or alternative time-lines, and stories may depict new or speculative scientific principles (such as time travel or psionics), or new technology (such as nanotechnology, faster-than-light travel or robots). Exploring the consequences of such differences is the traditional purpose of science fiction, making it a "literature of ideas".

Some science fiction authors construct a postulated history of the future called a "future history" that provides a common background for their fiction. Sometimes authors publish a timeline of events in their history, while other times the reader can reconstruct the order of the stories from information in the books. Some published works constitute "future history" in a more literal sense—i.e., stories or whole books written in the style of a history book but describing events in the future. Examples include H.G. Wells' The Shape of Things to Come (1933)—written in the form of a history book published in the year 2106 and in the manner of a real history book with numerous footnotes and references to the works of (mostly fictitious) prominent historians of the 20th and 21st centuries.

== See also ==
- Alternative future
- Divination
- List of emerging technologies
- Neo-futurism
- Prophecy
- Future events
  - Future of an expanding universe
  - Future of Earth
  - Future of the Solar System
  - Timeline of the near future
  - Timeline of the far future
