= B-theory of time =

Philosophical theory regarding temporal ordering of events

The B-theory of time, also called the tenseless theory of time, is one of two positions regarding the temporal ordering of events in the philosophy of time. B-theorists argue that the flow of time is only a subjective illusion of human consciousness, that the past, present, and future are equally real, and that time is tenseless: temporal becoming is not an objective feature of reality. Therefore, there is nothing privileged about the present, ontologically speaking.

The B-theory is derived from a distinction drawn by J. M. E. McTaggart between A series and B series. The B-theory is often drawn upon in theoretical physics and is seen in theories such as eternalism.

== Origin of terms ==
The terms A-theory and B-theory, first coined by Richard M. Gale in 1966, derive from Cambridge philosopher J. M. E. McTaggart's analysis of time and change in "The Unreality of Time" (1908), in which events are ordered via a tensed A-series or a tenseless B-series. It is popularly assumed that the A-theory represents time like an A-series, while the B-theory represents time like a B-series.

Events (or "times"), McTaggart observed, may be characterized in two distinct but related ways. On the one hand they can be characterized as past, present or future, normally indicated in natural languages such as English by the verbal inflection of tenses or auxiliary adverbial modifiers. Alternatively, events may be described as earlier than, simultaneous with, or later than others. Philosophers are divided as to whether the tensed or tenseless mode of expressing temporal fact is fundamental. Some philosophers have criticised hybrid theories, where one holds a tenseless view of time but asserts that the present has special properties, as falling foul of McTaggart's paradox. For a thorough discussion of McTaggart's paradox, see R. D. Ingthorsson (2016).

The debate between A-theorists and B-theorists is a continuation of a metaphysical dispute reaching back to the ancient Greek philosophers Heraclitus and Parmenides. Parmenides thought that reality is timeless and unchanging. Heraclitus, in contrast, believed that the world is a process of ceaseless change or flux. Reality for Heraclitus is dynamic and ephemeral. Indeed, the world is so fleeting, according to Heraclitus, that it is impossible to step twice into the same river. The metaphysical issues that continue to divide A-theorists and B-theorists concern the reality of the past, the reality of the future, and the ontological status of the present.

== B-theory in metaphysics ==
The difference between A-theorists and B-theorists is often described as a dispute about temporal passage or 'becoming' and 'progressing'. B-theorists argue that this notion is purely psychological. Many A-theorists argue that in rejecting temporal 'becoming', B-theorists reject time's most vital and distinctive characteristic. It is common (though not universal) to identify A-theorists' views with belief in temporal passage. Another way to characterise the distinction revolves around what is known as the principle of temporal parity, the thesis that contrary to what appears to be the case, all times really exist in parity. A-theory (and especially presentism) denies that all times exist in parity, while B-theory insists all times exist in parity.

B-theorists such as D. H. Mellor and J. J. C. Smart wish to eliminate all talk of past, present and future in favour of a tenseless ordering of events, believing the past, present, and future to be equally real, opposing the idea that they are irreducible foundations of temporality. B-theorists also argue that the past, present, and future feature very differently in deliberation and reflection. For example, we remember the past and anticipate the future, but not vice versa. B-theorists maintain that the fact that we know much less about the future simply reflects an epistemological difference between the future and the past: the future is no less real than the past; we just know less about it.

== Opposition ==
=== Irreducibility of tense ===
Earlier B-theorists argued that one could paraphrase tensed sentences (such as "the sun is now shining", uttered on September 28) into tenseless sentences (such as "on September 28, the sun shines") without loss of meaning. Later B-theorists argued that tenseless sentences could give the truth conditions of tensed sentences or their tokens. Quentin Smith argues that "now" cannot be reduced to descriptions of dates and times, because all date and time descriptions, and therefore truth conditionals, are relative to certain events. Tensed sentences, on the other hand, do not have such truth conditionals. The B-theorist could argue that "now" is reducible to a token-reflexive phrase such as "simultaneous with this utterance", yet Smith states that even such an argument fails to eliminate tense. One can think the statement "I am not uttering anything now", and such a statement would be true. The statement "I am not uttering anything simultaneous with this utterance" is self-contradictory, and cannot be true even when one thinks the statement. Finally, while tensed statements can express token-independent truth values, no token-reflexive statement can do so (by definition of the term "token-reflexive"). Smith claims that proponents of the B-theory argue that the inability to translate tensed sentences into tenseless sentences does not prove A-theory.

Logician and philosopher Arthur Prior has also drawn a distinction between what he calls A-facts and B-facts. The latter are facts about tenseless relations, such as the fact that the year 2025 is 25 years later than the year 2000. The former are tensed facts, such as that the Jurassic age is in the past, or that the end of the universe is in the future. Prior asks the reader to imagine having a headache, and after the headache subsides, saying "thank goodness that's over." Prior argues that the B-theory cannot make sense of this sentence. It seems bizarre to be thankful that a headache is earlier than one's utterance, anymore than being thankful that the headache is later than one's utterance. Indeed, most people who say "thank goodness that's over" are not even thinking of their own utterance. Therefore, when people say "thank goodness that's over," they are thankful for an A-fact, and not a B-fact. Yet, A-facts are only possible on the A-theory of time. (See also: Further facts.)

=== Endurantism and perdurantism ===
Opponents also charge the B-theory with being unable to explain persistence of objects. The two leading explanations for this phenomenon are endurantism and perdurantism. According to the former, an object is wholly present at every moment of its existence. According to the latter, objects are extended in time and therefore have temporal parts. Hales and Johnson explain endurantism as follows: "something is an enduring object only if it is wholly present at each time in which it exists. An object is wholly present at a time if all of its parts co-exist at that time." Under endurantism, all objects must exist as wholes at each point in time, but an object such as a rotting fruit will have the property of being not rotten one day and being rotten on another. On eternalism, and hence the B-theory, it seems that one is committed to two conflicting states for the same object. The spacetime (Minkowskian) interpretation of relativity adds an additional problem for endurantism under B-theory. On the spacetime interpretation, an object may appear as a whole at its rest frame, but on an inertial frame, it will have proper parts at different positions, and therefore different parts at different times. Hence it will not exist as a whole at any time, contradicting endurantism.

Opponents will then charge perdurantism with numerous difficulties of its own. First, it is controversial whether perdurantism can be formulated coherently. An object is defined as a collection of spatiotemporal parts, defined as pieces of a perduring object. If objects have temporal parts, this leads to difficulties. For example, the rotating discs argument asks the reader to imagine a world containing nothing more than a homogeneous spinning disk. Under endurantism, the same disc endures despite its rotations. The perdurantist supposedly has a difficult time explaining what it means for such a disc to have a determinate state of rotation. Temporal parts also seem to act unlike physical parts. A piece of chalk can be broken into two physical halves, but it seems nonsensical to talk about breaking it into two temporal halves. American epistemologist Roderick Chisholm argued that someone who hears the bird call "Bob White" knows "that his experience of hearing 'Bob' and his experience of hearing 'White' were not also had by two other things, each distinct from himself and from each other. The endurantist can explain the experience as "There exists an x such that x hears 'Bob' and then x hears 'White'" but the perdurantist cannot give such an account. Peter van Inwagen asks the reader to consider Descartes as a four-dimensional object that extends from 1596 to 1650. If Descartes had lived a much shorter life, he would have had a radically different set of temporal parts. This diminished Descartes, he argues, could not have been the same person on perdurantism, since their temporal extents and parts are so different.

=== First-person perspectives ===
Vincent Conitzer has argued against B-theory due to the existence of first-person perspectives and Benj Hellie's vertiginous question. He argues that arguments in favor of the A-theory of time are more effective as arguments for the combined position that A-theory is true and the "I" is metaphysically privileged from other perspectives. Caspar Hare has discussed similar ideas with the theories of egocentric presentism and perspectival realism.

== See also ==
- Cambridge change
