= Eternalism (philosophy of time) =

Philosophical view that there is no correct way of perceiving the passage of time

Illustration of the concept of eternalism, showing a man walking his dog. Time progresses through the series of snapshots from the bottom of the page to the top. In a common sense view of time, each of those four instants would exist one after another. According to eternalism, those four instants all equally exist.

In the philosophy of space and time, eternalism is an ontological view according to which all existence in time is equally real, as opposed to presentism or to the growing block universe theory of time — views according to which at least the future is not the same as any other time. Some forms of eternalism give time a similar ontology to that of space, as a dimension, with different times being as real as different places, with future events "already there" in the same sense other places are already there, and with no objective flow of time.

Eternalism is sometimes referred to as the "block time" or "block universe" theory due to its description of space-time as an unchanging four-dimensional "block", as opposed to the view of the world as a three-dimensional space modulated by the passage of time.

== The present ==
In classical philosophy, time is divided into three distinct regions: the "past", the "present", and the "future". Using that representational model, the past is generally seen as being immutably fixed, and the future as at least partly undefined. As time passes, the moment that was once the present becomes part of the past, and part of the future, in turn, becomes the new present. In this way time is said to pass, with a distinct present moment moving forward into the future and leaving the past behind. One view of this type, presentism, argues that only the present exists. The present does not travel forward through an environment of time, moving from a real point in the past and toward a real point in the future. Instead, it merely changes. The past and future do not exist and are only concepts used to describe the real, isolated, and changing present. This conventional model presents a number of difficult philosophical problems and may be difficult to reconcile with currently accepted scientific theories such as the theory of relativity.

The bar and ring paradox is an example of the relativity of simultaneity. Both ends of the bar pass through the ring simultaneously in the rest frame of the ring (left), but the ends of the bar pass one after the other in the rest frame of the bar (right).

It can be argued that special relativity eliminates the concept of absolute simultaneity and a universal present: according to the relativity of simultaneity, observers in different frames of reference can have different measurements of whether a given pair of events happened at the same time or at different times, with there being no physical basis for preferring one frame's judgments over those of another. However, there are events that may be non-simultaneous in all frames of reference: when one event is within the light cone of another—its causal past or causal future—then observers in all frames of reference show that one event preceded the other. The causal past and causal future are consistent within all frames of reference, but any other time is "elsewhere", and within it there is no present, past, or future. There is no physical basis for a set of events that represents the present.

Many philosophers have argued that relativity implies eternalism. Philosopher of science Dean Rickles says that, "the consensus among philosophers seems to be that special and general relativity are incompatible with presentism." Christian Wüthrich argues that supporters of presentism can salvage absolute simultaneity only if they reject either empiricism or relativity. Dean Zimmerman and others argue for a single privileged frame whose judgments about length, time, and simultaneity are the true ones, even if there is no empirical way to distinguish this frame. Hilary Putnam concluded in 1967 that it follows from special relativity that ″any future event X is already real″ and eternalism is the only view compatible with special relativity. The philosopher Mauro Dorato interprets Putnam's arguments differently and asserts that ″the opposition between presentism − only the presently existing event exist − and eternalism − past present and future events are equally real − which is somewhat presupposed in Putnam 1967, is misguided.″

== The flow of time ==
=== Antiquity ===
Arguments for and against an independent flow of time have been raised since antiquity, represented by fatalism, reductionism, and Platonism: Classical fatalism argues that every proposition about the future exists, and it is either true or false, hence there is a set of every true proposition about the future, which means these propositions describe the future exactly as it is, and this future is true and unavoidable. Fatalism is challenged by positing that there are propositions that are neither true nor false, for example they may be indeterminate. Reductionism questions whether time can exist independently of the relation between events, and Platonism argues that time is absolute, and it exists independently of the events that occupy it.

Earlier, pre-Socratic Greek philosopher Parmenides of Elea had posited that existence is timeless and change is impossible (an idea popularized by his disciple Zeno of Elea and his paradoxes about motion).

=== Middle ages ===
The philosopher Katherin A. Rogers argued that Anselm of Canterbury took an eternalist view of time, although the philosopher Brian Leftow argued against this interpretation, suggesting that Anselm instead advocated a type of presentism. Rogers responded to this paper, defending her original interpretation. Rogers also discusses this issue in her book Anselm on Freedom, using the term "four-dimensionalism" rather than "eternalism" for the view that "the present moment is not ontologically privileged", and commenting that "Boethius and Augustine do sometimes sound rather four-dimensionalist, but Anselm is apparently the first consistently and explicitly to embrace the position." Taneli Kukkonen argues in the Oxford Handbook of Medieval Philosophy that "what Augustine's and Anselm's mix of eternalist and presentist, tenseless and tensed language tells is that medieval philosophers saw no need to choose sides" the way modern philosophers do.

Augustine of Hippo wrote that God is outside of time—that time exists only within the created universe. Thomas Aquinas took the same view, and many theologians agree. On this view, God would perceive something like a block universe, while time might appear differently to the finite beings contained within it.

=== Modern period ===
One of the most famous arguments about the nature of time in modern philosophy is presented in The Unreality of Time by J. M. E. McTaggart. It argues that time is an illusion. McTaggart argued that the description of events as existing in absolute time is self-contradictory, because the events have to have properties about being in the past and in the future, which are incompatible with each other. McTaggart viewed this as a contradiction in the concept of time itself, and concluded that reality is non-temporal. He called this concept the B-theory of time.

Dirck Vorenkamp, a professor of religious studies, argued in his paper "B-Series Temporal Order in Dogen's Theory of Time" that the Zen Buddhist teacher Dōgen presented views on time that contained all the main elements of McTaggart's B-series view of time (which denies any objective present), although he noted that some of Dōgen's reasoning also contained A-series notions, which Vorenkamp argued may indicate some inconsistency in Dōgen's thinking.

Eternalism also encapsulates the theory of world lines, and the concept of linear reality that is - the individual perception of linear time.

=== Quantum physics ===
Some philosophers appeal to a specific theory that is "timeless" in a more radical sense than the rest of physics, the theory of quantum gravity. This theory is used, for instance, in Julian Barbour's theory of timelessness. On the other hand, George Ellis argues that time is absent in cosmological theories because of the details they leave out.

Recently, Hrvoje Nikolić has argued that a block time model solves the black hole information paradox.

== Objections ==
Philosophers such as John Lucas argue that "The Block universe gives a deeply inadequate view of time. It fails to account for the passage of time, the pre-eminence of the present, the directedness of time and the difference between the future and the past." Similarly, Karl Popper argued in his discussion with Albert Einstein against determinism and eternalism from a common-sense standpoint.

A flow-of-time theory with a strictly deterministic future, which nonetheless does not exist in the same sense as the present, would not satisfy common-sense intuitions about time. Some have argued that common-sense flow-of-time theories can be compatible with eternalism, for example John G. Cramer's transactional interpretation. Kastner (2010) "proposed that in order to preserve the elegance and economy of the interpretation, it may be necessary to consider offer and confirmation waves as propagating in a "higher space" of possibilities.

In Time Reborn, Lee Smolin argues that time is physically fundamental, in contrast to Einstein's view that time is an illusion. Smolin hypothesizes that the laws of physics are not fixed, but rather evolve over time via a form of cosmological natural selection. In The Singular Universe and the Reality of Time, co-authored with philosopher Roberto Mangabeira Unger, Smolin goes into more detail on his views on the physical passage of time. In contrast to the orthodox block universe view, Smolin argues that what instead exists is a "thick present" in which two events in the present can be causally related to each other. Marina Cortês and Lee Smolin also argue that certain classes of discrete dynamical systems demonstrate time asymmetry and irreversibility, which is inconsistent with the block universe interpretation of time.

Avshalom Elitzur vehemently rejects the block universe interpretation of time. At the Time in Cosmology conference, held at the Perimeter Institute for Theoretical Physics in 2016, Elitzur said: "I'm sick and tired of this block universe, ... I don't think that next Thursday has the same footing as this Thursday. The future does not exist. It does not! Ontologically, it's not there." Elitzur and Shahar Dolev argue that quantum mechanical experiments such as the Quantum Liar and the evaporation of black holes challenge the mainstream block universe model, and support the existence of an objective passage of time. Elitzur and Dolev believe that an objective passage of time and relativity can be reconciled, and that it would resolve many of the issues with the block universe and the conflict between relativity and quantum mechanics. Additionally, Elitzur and Dolev believe that certain quantum mechanical experiments provide evidence of apparently inconsistent histories, and that spacetime itself may therefore be subject to change affecting entire histories.

Some philosophers have made objections to eternalism based on the existence of the self and concepts such as Benj Hellie's vertiginous question. Vincent Conitzer argues that arguments in favor of the A-theory of time are more effective as arguments for the combined position of both A-theory being true and the "I" being metaphysically privileged from other perspectives. Similar arguments have been made by Caspar Hare with the theories of egocentric presentism and perspectival realism.

== See also ==
- A series and B series
- Arrow of time
- Centered world
- Eternity of the world
- Imaginary time
- Philosophical presentism
- Philosophy of space and time
- Problem of time
- Steady state
- Steady-state model
- Strata-cut animation

== Bibliography ==
- Smart, Jack. "River of Time". In Anthony Kenny. Essays in Conceptual Analysis. pp. 214–215.
- van Inwagen, Peter (2008). "Metaphysics." Stanford Encyclopedia of Philosophy.
