= Milič Čapek =

Czech–American philosopher (1909–1997)

- Born: 26 January 1909; Třebechovice, Bohemia, Austria-Hungary
- Died: 17 November 1997 (aged 88); Little Rock, Arkansas, United States

Philosophical work
- Era: 20th-century philosophy
- Region: Western philosophy
- School: Process philosophy
- Main interests: Metaphysics, Modern physics, Philosophy of space and time
- Notable ideas: Process philosophy

Milič Čapek (26 January 1909 – 17 November 1997) was a Czech–American philosopher. Čapek was strongly influenced by the process philosophy of Henri Bergson and to a lesser degree by Alfred North Whitehead. Much of his work was devoted to the relation of philosophy and modern physics, especially the philosophy of space and time and metaphysics.

== Life ==
Čapek was born in the municipality of Třebechovice in present-day Czech Republic (then part of Austria-Hungary).

He was married to Stephanie Čapek (born Štěpánka Řežábková), who was a school teacher in Czechoslovakia and later a housewife, and died on July 14, 1998 (aged 82), in Little Rock, Arkansas. Together they have a daughter, Dr. Stella M. Čapek from Conway, Arkansas.

In 1935 Čapek received his Ph.D. in philosophy at Charles University in Prague. Following the German occupation, he escaped from Czechoslovakia and studied at the Sorbonne in Paris, where he also directed Czech-language broadcasts back to his homeland. Ten days before the Nazi invasion, Čapek left Paris and went to America after an odyssey via Dakar, Casablanca and a Vichy concentration camp in Morocco. During the war he taught physics in the Army Specialized Training Program at the University of Iowa, the V-12 Navy College Training Program at Doan College, and at the University of Nebraska. After the war he returned to Czechoslovakia, where he taught briefly at the Palacký University of Olomouc. One month before the 1948 communist coup d'état he was fleeing once again, to take up permanent residence and citizenship in the United States.

In 1948 joined the Carleton College philosophy faculty. In 1962 he accepted a position as professor of philosophy at Boston University, where he served with distinction until his retirement in 1974. His visiting professorships included the Davis Campus of the University of California, Emory University, University of North Texas, Yale University, and, again, Carleton, as the Donald J. Cowling Distinguished Visiting professor of philosophy. In 1983 Čapek was honored by Carleton with a Doctor of Letters degree.

== Work ==
Čapek was the author of numerous articles in scholarly journals as well as of several books. Milič Čapek made major contributions to the understanding of the philosophical implications of relativity theory and quantum mechanics, and to the philosophy of time. He supported a dynamic view of time with real flow and genuine becoming, as opposed to the common block universe view with its static interpretation of time. Čapek stated that the reason why we think of time and space as "space-time" and rather than "time-space" is because we give priority to the spatial aspect in our effort to geometrize events and moments, or to render them "space-like", as Einstein said.

In The New Aspects of Time, Čapek investigates the longstanding attempt of philosophers and scientists to undermine the reality of time and the resistance this project encountered in the 20th century. The preference for a realm of perfect truth untouched by time is apparent in not only ancient philosophers such as Parmenides and Plato and Plotinus, all of whom regarded time (or process or becoming) as an illusion concealing the timeless reality, but modern thinkers such as Spinoza, Kant and Hegel. Čapek notes that Hegel regarded becoming as the synthesis of being and nonbeing, both of which are static. By reducing time to a sequence of durationless instants, Parmenides' student Zeno of Elea undermined its reality just as effectively as overt denial. How can anything happen when time is nothing more than instants, and instants have no duration? Kant echoed Zeno by defining the present as a mathematical point between past and future. Galileo, Descartes and Newton all characterized time as a mathematical continuum of point-instants. The widespread belief in determinism, articulated most famously by Laplace, annihilates time by eliminating novelty. What is the significance of time if it consists of nothing but the playing out of predetermined outcomes?

Čapek discusses the defense of the reality of time by 20th century philosophers William James, Henri Bergson and Alfred North Whitehead and also highlights supportive developments in physics. Laplace's demon, who can predict everything that will ever happen on the basis of current physical conditions, was defeated by the uncertainty principle of quantum mechanics. Because matter is inherently indeterminate, no one, not even a demon with infinite knowledge, can know where an electron will be located upon measurement. The inescapability of time is verified by the fact that a particle, rather than a "thing" that oscillates, is the oscillation itself. In other words, the micro-reality is events, not things. Far from charting a continuous path through space, an atom is a bundle of possible trajectories that periodically actualizes along an approximate trajectory. These "atoms of action" reveal that every instant takes up a certain duration, not a mathematical point but a "thick present.".

According to determinist philosopher Émile Boutroux, the idea of possibility, that an event might or not occur, is "an illusion caused by the interposition of time between our point of view and things in themselves." In response Čapek argues that our point of view is temporal precisely because things in themselves are temporal.

== Bibliography ==
=== Works by Čapek ===
- 1961. The Philosophical Impact of Contemporary Physics. Van Nostrand, ISBN 0-442-01452-X.
- 1971. Bergson and Modern Physics: A Re-Interpretation and Re-Evaluation. Boston Studies in the Philosophy of Science, Vol. 7. D. Reidel Publ. Comp., ISBN 978-90-277-0186-2 (Google Books).
- 1976 (edited by M. Čapek). The Concepts of Space and Time: Their Structure and Their Development. D. Reidel Publ. Comp, ISBN 90-277-0355-8 (Google Books).
- 1977. Immediate and Mediate Memory. Process Studies 7(2): 90-96 (fulltext online).
- 1988. Do the New Concepts of Space and Time Require a New Metaphysics? Chapter 6 pp. 90–104 in Kitchener, R. F. (ed.). The World View of Contemporary Physics: Does It Need a New Metaphysics?. SUNY Press, ISBN 0-88706-741-7.
- 1991. The New Aspects of Time: Its Continuity and Novelties. Boston Studies in the Philosophy of Science. Kluwer Academic, ISBN 0-7923-0911-1.

=== Works about Čapek and his thought ===
- Van Fraassen, Bas C., 1962. Capek on Eternal Recurrence. Journal of Philosophy 59(14): 371-375 (Abstract).
- Lenzen, V. F., 1963. Book Review: Milič Capek. The philosophical impact of contemporary physics. Philosophy of Science 30(1): 81–83.
- Sipfle, David A., 1998. Milič Čapek 1909-1997. Proceedings and Addresses of the American Philosophical Association 71(5): 138.
- Brogaard, Berit, 2000. The Coup de Grâce for Mechanistic Metaphysics: Čapek's New Philosophy of Nature. Transactions of the Charles S. Peirce Society 36(1): 75–108.

== See also ==
- Process philosophy
- American philosophy
- Philosophy of space and time
