= Block time =

Block time may refer to:

- Eternalism (philosophy of time), also called "block time philosophy"
- Block time of blockchains, the average time taken to create each block
- Block time (aviation)
