= Idealistic pluralism =

Philosophical point of view

Idealistic pluralism is a philosophical position that suggests while an individual's understanding of the world might be limited to only the ideas within their mind, it can be known in this way by more than one mind.

Idealistic pluralism rejects the idea of solipsism, which would be an idealistic monism. In the philosophy of George Berkeley, an idealistic pluralism is found in his assertion that many minds (each knowing the world though their own representations) exist, separate from each other, and from God.
