= Moving spotlight theory =

The terms moving spotlight theory or spotlight theory can refer to:

- the moving spotlight theory of time
- the moving spotlight theory of attention, see Attentional shift#The spotlight and gradient theories
