= Subjectivism =

Philosophy that accords primacy only to human thought

In philosophy, subjectivism is the doctrine that "our own mental activity is the only unquestionable fact of our experience", instead of shared or communal, and that there is no external or objective truth.

While Thomas Hobbes was an early proponent of subjectivism, the success of this position is historically attributed to Descartes and his methodic doubt. He used it as an epistemological tool to prove the opposite (an objective world of facts independent of one's own knowledge, ergo the "Father of Modern Philosophy" inasmuch as his views underlie a scientific worldview). Subjectivism accords primacy to subjective experience as fundamental of all measure and law. In forms like solipsism, it may hold that the nature and existence of every object depends solely on someone's subjective awareness of it. One may consider the qualified empiricism of George Berkeley in this context, given his reliance on God as the prime mover of human perception.

== Metaphysical subjectivism ==
Subjectivism is a label used to denote the philosophical tenet that "our own mental activity is the only unquestionable fact of our experience." While Thomas Hobbes was an early proponent of subjectivism, the success of this position is historically attributed to Descartes and his methodic doubt. Subjectivism has historically been condemned by Christian theologians, which oppose to it the objective authority of the church, the Christian dogma, and the revealed truth of the Bible. Christian theologians, and Karl Barth in particular, have also condemned anthropocentrism as a form of subjectivism.

Metaphysical subjectivism is the theory that reality is what we perceive to be real, and that there is no underlying true reality that exists independently of perception. One can also hold that it is consciousness rather than perception that is reality (idealism). This is in contrast to metaphysical objectivism and philosophical realism, which assert that there is an underlying 'objective' reality which is perceived in different ways.

This viewpoint should not be confused with the stance that "all is illusion" or that "there is no such thing as reality." Metaphysical subjectivists hold that reality is real enough. They conceive, however, that the nature of reality as related to a given consciousness is dependent on that consciousness. This has its philosophical basis in the writings of Descartes (see cogito ergo sum), and forms a cornerstone of Søren Kierkegaard's philosophy.

=== Modern versions ===
Recently, more modest versions of metaphysical subjectivism have been explored. For example, I might hold that it is a fact that chocolate is tasty, even though I recognize that it is not tasty to everyone. This would imply that there are facts that are subjective. (Analogously, one might hold that it is a fact that it is winter in the Northern Hemisphere, even though this is not always the case, implying that some facts are temporary.) Giovanni Merlo has developed a specific version of metaphysical subjectivism, under which subjective facts always concern mental properties. With Giulia Pravato, he has argued that his version of subjectivism provides a natural way to be both a realist and a relativist about, for example, the proposition that chocolate is tasty—it is part of reality (a subjective fact) that chocolate is tasty, but that doesn't mean it's necessarily true from another's point of view. Caspar Hare's theory of egocentric presentism is another, closely related example.

=== Subjectivism and panpsychism ===
One possible extension of subjectivist thought is that conscious experience is available to all objectively perceivable substrates. Upon viewing images produced by a camera on the rocking side of an erupting volcano, one might suppose that their relative motion followed from a subjective conscious within the volcano. These properties might also be attributed to the camera or its various components as well.

In this way, though, subjectivism morphs into a related doctrine, panpsychism, the belief that every objective entity (or event) has an inward or subjective aspect.

== Ethical subjectivism ==
Ethical subjectivism is the meta-ethical belief that ethical sentences reduce to factual statements about the attitudes and/or conventions of individual people, or that any ethical sentence implies an attitude held by someone. As such, it is a form of moral relativism in which the truth of moral claims is relative to the attitudes of individuals (as opposed to, for instance, communities). To a person imagining what it is like to be a cat, catching and eating mice is perfectly natural and morally sound. To a person imagining they are a mouse, being hunted by cats is morally abhorrent. Though this is a loose metaphor, it serves to illustrate the view that each individual subject has their own understanding of right and wrong.

An ethical subjectivist might propose, for example, that what it means for something to be morally right is just for it to be approved of. (This can lead to the belief that different things are right according to each idiosyncratic moral outlook.) One implication of these beliefs is that, unlike the moral skeptic or the non-cognitivist, the subjectivist thinks that ethical sentences, while subjective, are nonetheless the kind of thing that can be true or false depending on situation.

== In probability ==
Broadly speaking, there are two views on Bayesian probability that interpret the probability concept in different ways. In probability, a subjectivist stand is the belief that probabilities are simply degrees-of-belief by rational agents in a certain proposition, and which have no objective reality in and of themselves. According to the subjectivist view, probability measures a "personal belief". For this kind of subjectivist, a phrase having to do with probability simply asserts the degree to which the subjective actor believes their assertion is true or false. As a consequence, a subjectivist has no problem with differing people giving different probabilities to an uncertain proposition, and all being correct.

Many modern machine learning methods are based on objectivist Bayesian principles. According to the objectivist view, the rules of Bayesian statistics can be justified by requirements of rationality and consistency and interpreted as an extension of logic. In attempting to justify subjective probability, Bruno de Finetti created the notion of philosophical coherence. According to his theory, a probability assertion is akin to a bet, and a bet is coherent only if it does not expose the wagerer to loss if their opponent chooses wisely. To explain his meaning, de Finetti created a thought-experiment to illustrate the need for principles of coherency in making a probabilistic statement. In his scenario, when someone states their degree-of-belief in something, one places a small bet for or against that belief and specifies the odds, with the understanding that the other party to the bet may then decide which side of the bet to take. Thus, if Bob specifies 3-to-1 odds against a proposition A, his opponent Joe may then choose whether to require Bob to risk $1 in order to win $3 if proposition A is found to be true, or to require Bob to risk $3 in order to win $1 if the proposition A is not true. In this case, it is possible for Joe to win over Bob. According to de Finetti, then, this case is incoherent.

== See also ==
- Egocentric predicament
- Dutch book
- Transactionalism
- Transcendental subjectivism
- Phenomenology
- Existentialism
- Austrian economics and praxeology
- Vertiginous question
