= Richard M. Gale =

American philosopher (1932–2015)

Richard Gale
- Born: July 13, 1932
- Died: July 19, 2015 (aged 83); Knoxville, Tennessee, United States

Education
- Education: NYU (PhD)

Philosophical work
- Era: 21st-century philosophy
- Region: Western philosophy
- Institutions: University of Pittsburgh
- Notable ideas: Gale–Pruss cosmological argument

Richard M. Gale (July 13, 1932 – July 19, 2015) was an American philosopher and professor emeritus of philosophy at the University of Pittsburgh. Gale was known for defending the A-theory of time against the B-theory.

In his 1991 book On the Nature and Existence of God, Gale had criticized the idea central to Christian theism of an eternal, immutable and timeless God who is omniscient and omnipotent. But since 1999, he defended a cosmological argument for the existence of a necessary creator of the universe. Gale was not existentially religious and instead argued from the perspective of a "'detached … spectator of all time and eternity' following the logic wherever it leads".

== Books ==
- 1968: The Language of Time, London: Routledge & Kegan Paul
- 1976: Negation and Non-being, American Philosophical Quarterly Monograph No. 10. Oxford: Blackwell
- 1991: On the Nature and Existence of God, London: Cambridge University Press
- 1999: The Divided Self of William James, London: Cambridge University Press
- 2004: The Philosophy of William James: an Introduction, London: Cambridge University Press
- 2007: On the Philosophy of Religion, Boston: Wadsworth
- 2010: John Dewey's Quest for Unity: The Journey of a Promethean Mystic, Amherst: Prometheus Press
- 2010: God and Metaphysics, Amherst: Prometheus Press
