= Philosophy of space and time =

Branch of philosophy relating to spatiality and temporality

The philosophy of space and time is a branch of philosophy concerned with ideas about knowledge and understanding within space and time. Such ideas have been central to philosophy from its inception.

The philosophy of space and time was both an inspiration for and a central aspect of early analytic philosophy. The subject focuses on a number of basic issues, including whether time and space exist independently of the mind, whether they exist independently of one another, what accounts for time's apparently unidirectional flow, whether times other than the present moment exist, and questions about the nature of identity (particularly the nature of identity over time).

== Ancient and medieval views ==
The earliest recorded philosophy of time was expounded by the ancient Egyptian thinker Ptahhotep (c. 2650–2600 BC), who said:

Follow your desire as long as you live, and do not perform more than is ordered, do not lessen the time of the following desire, for the wasting of time is an abomination to the spirit...

— 11th maxim of Ptahhotep

The Vedas, the earliest texts on Indian philosophy and Hindu philosophy, dating back to the late 2nd millennium BC, describe ancient Hindu cosmology, in which the universe goes through repeated cycles of creation, destruction, and rebirth, with each cycle lasting 4,320,000,000 years. Ancient Greek philosophers, including Parmenides and Heraclitus, wrote essays on the nature of time.

Incas regarded space and time as a single concept, named pacha (Quechua: pacha, Aymara: pacha).

Plato, in the Timaeus, identified time with the period of motion of the heavenly bodies, and space as that in which things come to be. Aristotle, in Book IV of his Physics, defined time as the number of changes with respect to before and after, and the place of an object as the innermost motionless boundary of that which surrounds it.

In Book 11 of St. Augustine's Confessions, he reflects on the nature of time, asking, "What then is time? If no one asks me, I know: if I wish to explain it to one who asks, I know not." He goes on to comment on the difficulty of thinking about time, pointing out the inaccuracy of common speech: "For but few things are there of which we speak properly; of most things we speak improperly, still, the things intended are understood." But Augustine presented the first philosophical argument for the reality of Creation (against Aristotle) in the context of his discussion of time, saying that knowledge of time depends on the knowledge of the movement of things, and therefore time cannot be where there are no creatures to measure its passing (Confessions Book XI ¶30; City of God Book XI ch.6).

In contrast to ancient Greek philosophers who believed that the universe had an infinite past with no beginning, medieval philosophers and theologians developed the concept of the universe having a finite past with a beginning, now known as temporal finitism. John Philoponus presented early arguments, adopted by later Christian philosophers and theologians of the form "argument from the impossibility of the existence of an actual infinite", which states:

"An actual infinite cannot exist."
"An infinite temporal regress of events is an actual infinite."
"∴ An infinite temporal regress of events cannot exist."

In the early 11th century, the Muslim physicist Ibn al-Haytham (Alhacen or Alhazen) discussed space perception and its epistemological implications in his Book of Optics (1021). He also rejected Aristotle's definition of topos (Physics IV) by way of geometric demonstrations and defined place as a mathematical spatial extension. His experimental disproof of the extramission hypothesis of vision led to changes in the understanding of the visual perception of space, contrary to the previous emission theory of vision supported by Euclid and Ptolemy. In "tying the visual perception of space to prior bodily experience, Alhacen unequivocally rejected the intuitiveness of spatial perception and, therefore, the autonomy of vision. Without tangible notions of distance and size for correlation, sight can tell us next to nothing about such things."

== Realism and anti-realism ==
A traditional realist position in ontology is that time and space have existence apart from the human mind. Idealists, by contrast, deny or doubt the existence of objects independent of the mind. Some anti-realists, whose ontological position is that objects outside the mind do exist, nevertheless doubt the independent existence of time and space.

In 1781, Immanuel Kant published the Critique of Pure Reason, one of the most influential works in the history of the philosophy of space and time. He describes time as an a priori notion that, together with other a priori notions such as space, allows us to comprehend sense experience. Kant holds that neither space nor time are substance, entities in themselves, or learned by experience; he holds, rather, that both are elements of a systematic framework we use to structure our experience. Spatial measurements are used to quantify how far apart objects are, and temporal measurements are used to quantitatively compare the interval between (or duration of) events. Kant's Critique never implied that time and space are empirical facts. To say that they are «out there in the world» is to imply that the thing in itself is knowable, which, for Kant, is an impossibility.

Some idealist writers, such as J. M. E. McTaggart in The Unreality of Time, have argued that time is an illusion.

The writers discussed here are for the most part realists in this regard; for instance, Gottfried Leibniz held that his monads existed, at least independently of the mind of the observer.

== Absolutism and relationalism ==
=== Leibniz and Newton ===
The great debate between defining notions of space and time as real objects themselves (absolute), or mere orderings upon actual objects (relational), began between physicists Isaac Newton (via his spokesman, Samuel Clarke) and Gottfried Leibniz in the papers of the Leibniz–Clarke correspondence.

Arguing against the absolutist position, Leibniz offers a number of thought experiments with the purpose of showing that there is contradiction in assuming the existence of facts such as absolute location and velocity. These arguments trade heavily on two principles central to his philosophy: the principle of sufficient reason and the identity of indiscernibles. The principle of sufficient reason holds that for every fact, there is a reason that is sufficient to explain what and why it is the way it is and not otherwise. The identity of indiscernibles states that if there is no way of telling two entities apart, then they are one and the same thing.

The example Leibniz uses involves two proposed universes situated in absolute space. The only discernible difference between them is that the latter is positioned five feet to the left of the first. The example is only possible if such a thing as absolute space exists. Such a situation, however, is not possible, according to Leibniz, for if it were, a universe's position in absolute space would have no sufficient reason, as it might very well have been anywhere else. Therefore, it contradicts the principle of sufficient reason, and there could exist two distinct universes that were in all ways indiscernible, thus contradicting the identity of indiscernibles.

Standing out in Clarke's (and Newton's) response to Leibniz's arguments is the bucket argument: Water in a bucket, hung from a rope and set to spin, will start with a flat surface. As the water begins to spin in the bucket, the surface of the water will become concave. If the bucket is stopped, the water will continue to spin, and while the spin continues, the surface will remain concave. The concave surface is apparently not the result of the interaction of the bucket and the water, since the surface is flat when the bucket first starts to spin; the surface of the water becomes concave as the water itself, influenced by the spinning motion of the bucket, also begins to spin, and the surface remains concave as the bucket stops.

In this response, Clarke argues for the necessity of the existence of absolute space to account for phenomena like rotation and acceleration that cannot be accounted for on a purely relationalist account. Clarke argues that since the curvature of the water occurs in the rotating bucket as well as in the stationary bucket containing spinning water, it can only be explained by stating that the water is rotating in relation to the presence of some third thing—absolute space.

Leibniz describes a space that exists only as a relation between objects, and which has no existence apart from the existence of those objects. Motion exists only as a relation between those objects. Newtonian space provided the absolute frame of reference within which objects can have motion. In Newton's system, the frame of reference exists independently of the objects contained within it. These objects can be described as moving in relation to space itself. For almost two centuries, the evidence of a concave water surface held authority.

=== Mach ===
Another important figure in this debate is 19th-century physicist Ernst Mach. While he did not deny the existence of phenomena like that seen in the bucket argument, he still denied the absolutist conclusion by offering a different answer as to what the bucket was rotating in relation to: the fixed stars.

Mach suggested that thought experiments like the bucket argument are problematic. If we were to imagine a universe that only contains a bucket, on Newton's account, this bucket could be set to spin relative to absolute space, and the water it contained would form the characteristic concave surface. But in the absence of anything else in the universe, it would be difficult to confirm that the bucket was indeed spinning. It seems equally possible that the surface of the water in the bucket would remain flat.

Mach argued that, in effect, the water experiment in an otherwise empty universe would remain flat. But if another object were introduced into this universe, perhaps a distant star, there would now be something relative to which the bucket could be seen as rotating. The water inside the bucket could possibly have a slight curve. To account for the curve that we observe, an increase in the number of objects in the universe also increases the curvature in the water. Mach argued that the momentum of an object, whether angular or linear, exists as a result of the sum of the effects of other objects in the universe (Mach's Principle).

=== Einstein ===
Albert Einstein proposed that the laws of physics should be based on the principle of relativity. This principle holds that the rules of physics must be the same for all observers, regardless of the frame of reference that is used, and that light propagates at the same speed in all reference frames.

Einstein generalized relativity to frames of reference that were non-inertial. He achieved this by positing the Equivalence Principle, which states that the force felt by an observer in a given gravitational field and that felt by an observer in an accelerating frame of reference are indistinguishable. This led to the conclusion that the mass of an object warps the geometry of the space-time surrounding it, as described in Einstein's field equations.

In classical physics, an inertial reference frame is one in which an object that experiences no forces does not accelerate. In general relativity, an inertial frame of reference is one that is following a geodesic of space-time. An object that moves against a geodesic experiences a force. An object in free fall does not experience a force, because it is following a geodesic. An object standing on the earth, however, will experience a force, as it is being held against the geodesic by the surface of the planet.

Einstein partially advocates Mach's principle in that distant stars explain inertia because they provide the gravitational field against which acceleration and inertia occur. But contrary to Leibniz's account, this warped space-time is as integral a part of an object as are its other defining characteristics, such as volume and mass. If one holds, contrary to idealist beliefs, that objects exist independently of the mind, it seems that relativistics commit one also to hold the idea that space and temporality have exactly the same type of independent existence.

== Conventionalism ==
The position of conventionalism states that there is no fact of the matter as to the geometry of space and time, but that it is decided by convention. The first proponent of such a view, Henri Poincaré, reacting to the creation of the new non-Euclidean geometries, argued that which geometry applied to a space was decided by convention, since different geometries will describe a set of objects equally well, based on considerations from his sphere-world.

This view was developed and updated to include considerations from relativistic physics by Hans Reichenbach. Reichenbach's conventionalism, applying to space and time, focuses around the idea of coordinative definition.

Coordinative definition has two major features. The first has to do with coordinating units of length with certain physical objects. This is motivated by the fact that we can never directly apprehend length. Instead we must choose some physical object, say the Standard Metre at the Bureau International des Poids et Mesures (International Bureau of Weights and Measures), or the wavelength of cadmium to stand in as our unit of length. The second feature deals with separated objects. Although we can, presumably, directly test the equality of length of two measuring rods when they are next to one another, we can not find out as much for two rods distant from one another. Even supposing that two rods, whenever brought near to one another are seen to be equal in length, we are not justified in stating that they are always equal in length. This impossibility undermines our ability to decide the equality of length of two distant objects. Sameness of length, to the contrary, must be set by definition.

Such a use of coordinative definition is in effect made of, on Reichenbach's conventionalism, in the General Theory of Relativity where light is assumed, i.e. not discovered, to mark out equal distances in equal times. After this setting of coordinative definition, however, the geometry of spacetime is set.

As in the absolutism/relationalism debate, contemporary philosophy is still in disagreement as to the correctness of the conventionalist doctrine.

== Structure of space-time ==
Building from a mix of insights from the historical debates of absolutism and conventionalism as well as reflecting on the import of the technical apparatus of the General Theory of Relativity, details as to the structure of space-time have made up a large proportion of discussion within the philosophy of space and time, as well as the philosophy of physics. The following is a short list of topics.

=== Relativity of simultaneity ===
According to special relativity, different inertial observers will call different sets of events simultaneous from one another and they will both be right relative to their inertial frame of reference. That is, for example, while observer A may say that events E_{1} and E_{2} are simultaneous, another observer B, that's moving in uniform motion relative to observer A, will say that the two events are not simultaneous. This phenomenon, known as relativity of simultaneity, has been used to support the metaphysical view known as eternalism and as an objection against presentism. Eternalists maintain that all events in the present, past, and future are, in a sense, ontologically, on a par. This is to say that present events have no privileged existence as compared to events in the past and future. Presentists, on the other hand, maintain that events in the present have a privileged existence (some even maintain that past and future events don't exist). The relativity of simultaneity has been used in the dialectic against presentists because it's hard to see which observer's present could be the one with privileged existence if special relativity says that all inertial frames of reference are on a par.

=== Historical frameworks ===
A further application of the modern mathematical methods, in league with the idea of invariance and covariance groups, is to try to interpret historical views of space and time in modern, mathematical language.

In these translations, a theory of space and time is seen as a manifold paired with vector spaces, the more vector spaces the more facts there are about objects in that theory. The historical development of spacetime theories is generally seen to start from a position where many facts about objects are incorporated in that theory, and as history progresses, more and more structure is removed.

For example, Aristotelian space and time has both absolute position and special places, such as the center of the cosmos and the circumference. Newtonian space and time has absolute position and is Galilean invariant, but does not have special positions.

== Direction of time ==
The problem of the direction of time arises directly from two disparate facts. Firstly, the fundamental physical laws are time-reversal invariant; if a cinematographic film were taken of any process describable by means of the aforementioned laws and then played backwards, it would still portray a physically possible process. Secondly, our experience of time, at the macroscopic level, is not time-reversal invariant; glasses fall and break, but shards of glass do not reassemble and fly up onto tables.

=== Causation solution ===
One solution to this problem takes a metaphysical view, in which the direction of time follows from an asymmetry of causation. We know more about the past because the elements of the past are causes for the effects that compose our perception. We cannot affect the past, but we can affect the outcomes of the future.

There are two main objections to this view. First is the problem of distinguishing the cause from the effect in a non-arbitrary way. The use of causation in constructing a temporal ordering could easily become circular. The second problem with this view is its explanatory power. While the causation account, if successful, may account for some time-asymmetric phenomena like perception and action, it does not account for many others.

However, asymmetry of causation can be observed in a non-arbitrary way which is not metaphysical in the case of a human hand dropping a cup of water which smashes into fragments on a hard floor, spilling the liquid. In this order, the causes of the resultant pattern of cup fragments and water spill is easily attributable in terms of the trajectory of the cup, irregularities in its structure, angle of its impact on the floor, etc. However, applying the same event in reverse, it is difficult to explain why the various pieces of the cup should fly up into the human hand and reassemble precisely into the shape of a cup, or why the water should position itself entirely within the cup. The causes of the resultant structure and shape of the cup and the encapsulation of the water by the hand within the cup are not easily attributable, as neither hand nor floor can achieve such formations of the cup or water. This asymmetry is perceivable on account of two features: i) the relationship between the agent capacities of the human hand (i.e., what it is and is not capable of and what it is for) and non-animal agency (i.e., what floors are and are not capable of and what they are for) and ii) that the pieces of cup came to possess exactly the nature and number of those of a cup before assembling. In short, such asymmetry is attributable to the relationship between i) temporal direction and ii) the implications of form and functional capacity.

The application of these ideas of form and functional capacity only dictates temporal direction in relation to complex scenarios involving specific, non-metaphysical agency which is not merely dependent on human perception of time. However, this last observation in itself is not sufficient to invalidate the implications of the example for the progressive nature of time in general.

=== Thermodynamics solution ===
The second major family of solutions to this problem, and by far the one that has generated the most literature, finds the existence of the direction of time as relating to the nature of thermodynamics.

The answer from classical thermodynamics states that while our basic physical theory is, in fact, time-reversal symmetric, thermodynamics is not. In particular, the second law of thermodynamics states that the net entropy of a closed system never decreases, and this explains why we often see glass breaking, but not coming back together.

But in statistical mechanics things become more complicated. On one hand, statistical mechanics is far superior to classical thermodynamics, in that thermodynamic behavior, such as glass breaking, can be explained by the fundamental laws of physics paired with a statistical postulate. But statistical mechanics, unlike classical thermodynamics, is time-reversal symmetric. The second law of thermodynamics, as it arises in statistical mechanics, merely states that it is overwhelmingly likely that net entropy will increase, but it is not an absolute law.

Current thermodynamic solutions to the problem of the direction of time aim to find some further fact, or feature of the laws of nature to account for this discrepancy.

=== Laws solution ===
A third type of solution to the problem of the direction of time, although much less represented, argues that the laws are not time-reversal symmetric. For example, certain processes in quantum mechanics, relating to the weak nuclear force, are not time-reversible, keeping in mind that when dealing with quantum mechanics time-reversibility comprises a more complex definition. But this type of solution is insufficient because 1) the time-asymmetric phenomena in quantum mechanics are too few to account for the uniformity of macroscopic time-asymmetry and 2) it relies on the assumption that quantum mechanics is the final or correct description of physical processes.

One recent proponent of the laws solution is Tim Maudlin who argues that the fundamental laws of physics are laws of temporal evolution (see Maudlin [2007]). However, elsewhere Maudlin argues: "[the] passage of time is an intrinsic asymmetry in the temporal structure of the world... It is the asymmetry that grounds the distinction between sequences that runs from past to future and sequences which run from future to past" [ibid, 2010 edition, p. 108]. Thus it is arguably difficult to assess whether Maudlin is suggesting that the direction of time is a consequence of the laws or is itself primitive.

== Flow of time ==
The problem of the flow of time, as it has been treated in analytic philosophy, owes its beginning to a paper written by J. M. E. McTaggart, in which he proposes two "temporal series". The first series, which means to account for our intuitions about temporal becoming, or the moving Now, is called the A-series. The A-series orders events according to their being in the past, present or future, simpliciter and in comparison to each other. The B-series eliminates all reference to the present, and the associated temporal modalities of past and future, and orders all events by the temporal relations earlier than and later than. In many ways, the debate between proponents of these two views can be seen as a continuation of the early modern debate between the view that there is absolute time (defended by Isaac Newton) and the view that there is only merely relative time (defended by Gottfried Leibniz).

McTaggart, in his paper "The Unreality of Time", argues that time is unreal since a) the A-series is inconsistent and b) the B-series alone cannot account for the nature of time as the A-series describes an essential feature of it.

Building from this framework, two camps of solution have been offered. The first, the A-theorist solution, takes becoming as the central feature of time, and tries to construct the B-series from the A-series by offering an account of how B-facts come to be out of A-facts. The second camp, the B-theorist solution, takes as decisive McTaggart's arguments against the A-series and tries to construct the A-series out of the B-series, for example, by temporal indexicals.

== Temporal Ontology ==
Various views of time are defined by what times they claim exist. These include the view that only the present exists (Presentism); that all times exist equally (Eternalism); the view that the past exists, while the future does not (Growing block universe); and that the past and all possible futures since the beginning of the universe exist (associated with the Many worlds interpretation of quantum mechanics), amongst other views.

According to Presentism, time is an ordering of various realities. At a certain time, some things exist and others do not. This is the only reality we can deal with. We cannot, for example, say that Homer exists because at the present time he does not. An Eternalist, on the other hand, holds that time is a dimension of reality on a par with the three spatial dimensions, and hence that all things—past, present and future—can be said to be just as real as things in the present. According to this theory, then, Homer really does exist, though we must still use special language when talking about somebody who exists at a distant time—just as we would use special language when talking about something far away (the very words near, far, above, below, and such are directly comparable to phrases such as in the past, a minute ago, and so on).

Philosophers such as Vincent Conitzer and Caspar Hare have argued that the philosophy of time is connected to the philosophy of self. Conitzer argues that the metaphysics of the self are connected to the A-theory of time, and that arguments in favour of A-theory are more effective as arguments for the combined position of both A-theory being true and the "I" being metaphysically privileged from other perspectives. Caspar Hare has made similar arguments with the theories of egocentric presentism and perspectival realism, of which several other philosophers have written reviews.

== Endurantism and perdurantism ==
The positions on the persistence of objects are somewhat similar. An endurantist holds that for an object to persist through time is for it to exist completely at different times (each instance of existence we can regard as somehow separate from previous and future instances, though still numerically identical with them). A perdurantist on the other hand holds that for a thing to exist through time is for it to exist as a continuous reality, and that when we consider the thing as a whole we must consider an aggregate of all its "temporal parts" or instances of existing. Endurantism is seen as the conventional view and flows out of our pre-philosophical ideas (when I talk to somebody I think I am talking to that person as a complete object, and not just a part of a cross-temporal being), but perdurantists such as David Lewis have attacked this position. They argue that perdurantism is the superior view for its ability to take account of change in objects.

On the whole, Presentists are also endurantists and Eternalists are also perdurantists (and vice versa), but this is not a necessary relation and it is possible to claim, for instance, that time's passage indicates a series of ordered realities, but that objects within these realities somehow exist outside of the reality as a whole, even though the realities as wholes are not related. However, such positions are rarely adopted.

== See also ==
Works:

- Being and Time
- Critique of Pure Reason
- The End of Time
- Process and Reality
- Time Reborn

People:

- Quentin Smith
- Milič Čapek

Topics:

- Arrow of time
- Chronometry
- Einstein's thought experiments
- Eternal return
- Measure problem (cosmology)
- Metaphysics
- Moving spotlight theory of time
- Presentism (philosophy of time)
- Process philosophy
- Spacetime
- Temporality
- Temporal parts
- Time geography
- Time travel in science and time travel in fiction
- Zeno's paradoxes
