= Solipsism =

Philosophical idea that only one's own mind is certain to exist

Solipsism (/ˈsɒlɪpsɪzəm/ SOLL-ip-siz-əm; from Latin sōlus 'alone' and ipse 'self') is the philosophical position that only one's own mind is certain to exist. It holds that knowledge of anything outside one's own mind, including the external world and other minds, is uncertain and cannot be conclusively known.

== Varieties ==
There are varying degrees of solipsism that parallel the varying degrees of skepticism:

=== Metaphysical ===
Metaphysical solipsism is a variety of solipsism based on a philosophy of subjective idealism. Metaphysical solipsists maintain that the self is the only existing reality and that all other realities, including the external world and other persons, are representations of that self, having no independent existence. There are several versions of metaphysical solipsism, such as Caspar Hare's egocentric presentism (or perspectival realism), in which other people are conscious, but their experiences are simply not present.

=== Epistemological ===
Epistemological solipsism is the variety of idealism according to which only the directly accessible mental contents of the solipsistic philosopher can be known. The existence of an external world is regarded as an unresolvable question rather than actually false. Further, one cannot also be certain as to what extent the external world exists independently of one's mind. For instance, it may be that a God-like being controls the sensations received by the mind, making it appear as if there is an external world when most of it (excluding the God-like being and oneself) is false. However, the point remains that epistemological solipsists consider this an "unresolvable" question.

=== Methodological ===
Methodological solipsism is an agnostic variant of solipsism. It exists in opposition to the strict epistemological requirements for "knowledge" (e.g. the requirement that knowledge must be certain). It still entertains the points that any induction is fallible. Methodological solipsism sometimes goes even further to say that even what we perceive as the brain is actually part of the external world, for it is only through our senses that we can see or feel the mind. Only the existence of thoughts is known.

Methodological solipsists do not intend to conclude that the stronger forms of solipsism are actually true. They simply emphasize that justifications of an external world must be founded on indisputable facts about their own consciousness. The methodological solipsist believes that subjective impressions (empiricism) or innate knowledge (rationalism) are the sole possible or proper starting point for philosophical construction. Often methodological solipsism is not held as a belief system, but rather used as a thought experiment to assist skepticism (e.g. René Descartes' Cartesian skepticism).

== Main points ==
Mere denial of material existence, in itself, does not necessarily constitute solipsism.

Philosophers generally try to build knowledge on more than an inference or analogy. Well-known frameworks such as Descartes' epistemological enterprise brought to popularity the idea that all certain knowledge may go no further than "I think; therefore I exist." Descartes' view provides one key detail about the nature of the "I" that has been proven to exist, its relation to a God of positive attribution.

The theory of solipsism also merits close examination because it relates to three widely held philosophical presuppositions, each itself fundamental and wide-ranging in importance:

- One's most certain knowledge is the content of one's own mind—my thoughts, experiences, affects, etc.
- There is no conceptual or logically necessary link between mental and physical—between, for example, the occurrence of certain conscious experience or mental states and the "possession" and behavioral dispositions of a "body" of a particular kind.
- The experience of a given person is necessarily private to that person.

To expand on the second point, the conceptual problem is that the previous point assumes mind or consciousness (which are attributes) can exist independent of some entity having this attribute (a capability in this case), i.e., that an attribute of an existent can exist apart from the existent itself. If one admits to the existence of an independent entity (e.g., the brain) having that attribute, the door is open to an independent reality.

Some philosophers hold that, while it cannot be proven that anything independent of one's mind exists, the point that solipsism makes is irrelevant. This is because, whether the world as we perceive it exists independently or not, we cannot escape this perception, hence it is best to act assuming that the world is independent of our minds.

== History ==
Origins of solipsist thought are found in Enlightenment thinkers such as Thomas Hobbes and Descartes.

=== René Descartes ===
The foundations of solipsism are in turn the foundations of the view that the individual's understanding of any and all psychological concepts (thinking, willing, perceiving, etc.) is accomplished by making an analogy with their own mental states; i.e., by abstraction from inner experience. This view, or some variant of it, has been influential in philosophy since René Descartes elevated the search for incontrovertible certainty to the status of the primary goal of epistemology, whilst also elevating epistemology to "first philosophy".

=== Berkeley ===
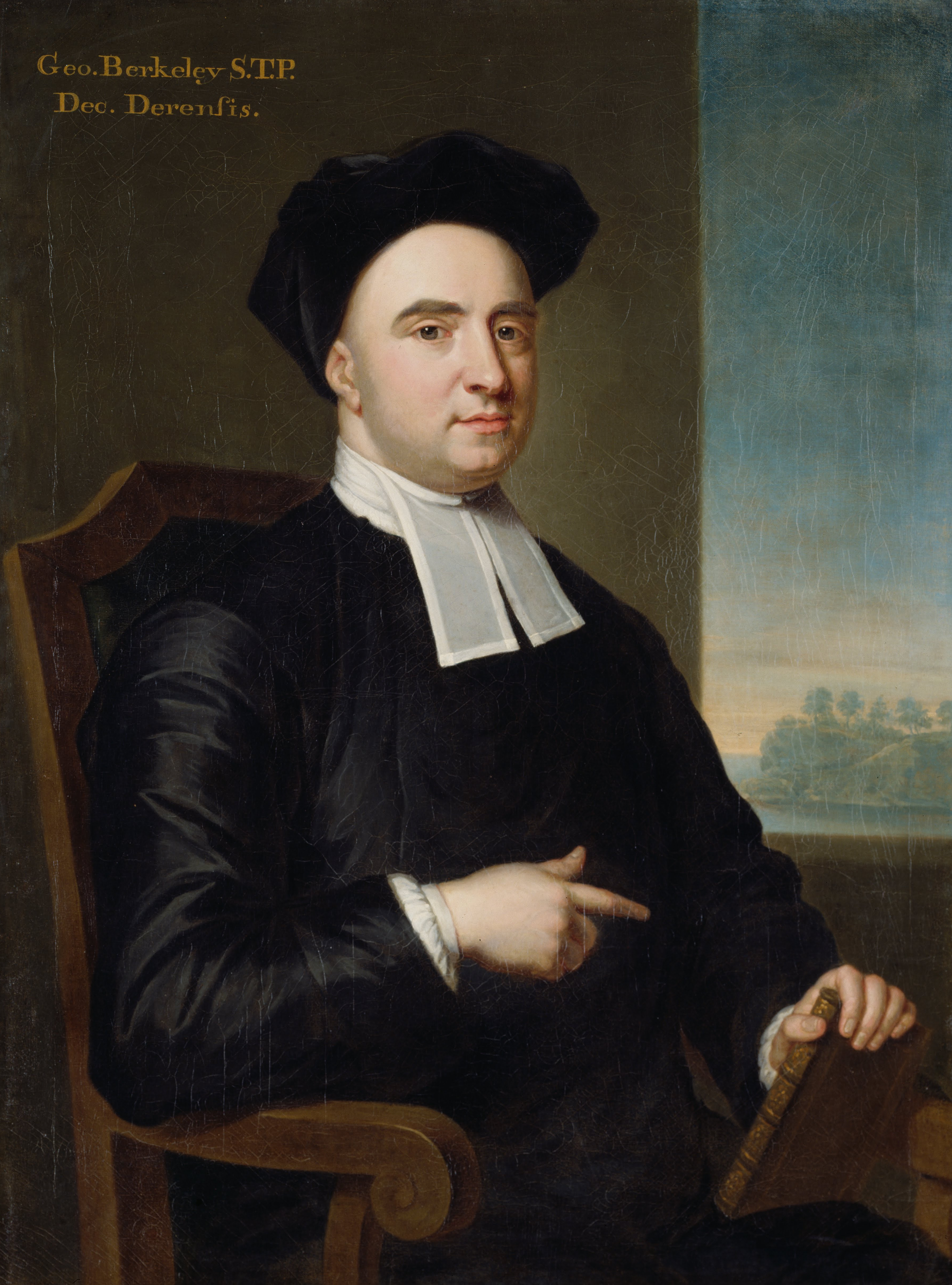
1727 portrait of George Berkeley by John Smibert

George Berkeley's arguments against materialism in favour of idealism provide a solipsist with a number of arguments not found in Descartes. While Descartes defends ontological dualism, thus accepting the existence of a material world (res extensa) as well as immaterial minds (res cogitans) and God, Berkeley denies the existence of matter but not minds, of which God is one.

== Relation to other ideas ==
=== Idealism and materialism ===
One of the most fundamental debates in philosophy concerns the "true" nature of the world—whether it is some ethereal plane of ideas or a reality of atomic particles and energy. Materialism posits a real "world out there", as well as in and through us, that can be sensed—seen, heard, tasted, touched and felt, sometimes with prosthetic technologies corresponding to human sensing organs. (Materialists do not claim that human senses or even their prosthetics can, even when collected, sense the totality of the universe; simply that they collectively cannot sense what cannot in any way be known to us.) Materialists do not find this a useful way of thinking about the ontology and ontogeny of ideas, but we might say that from a materialist perspective pushed to a logical extreme communicable to an idealist, ideas are ultimately reducible to a physically communicated, organically, socially and environmentally embedded 'brain state'. While reflexive existence is not considered by materialists to be experienced on the atomic level, the individual's physical and mental experiences are ultimately reducible to the unique tripartite combination of environmentally determined, genetically determined, and randomly determined interactions of firing neurons and atomic collisions.

For materialists, ideas have no primary reality as essences separate from our physical existence. From a materialist perspective, ideas are social (rather than purely biological), and formed and transmitted and modified through the interactions between social organisms and their social and physical environments. This materialist perspective informs scientific methodology, insofar as that methodology assumes that humans have no access to omniscience and that therefore human knowledge is an ongoing, collective enterprise that is best produced via scientific and logical conventions adjusted specifically for material human capacities and limitations.

Modern idealists believe that the mind and its thoughts are the only true things that exist. This is the reverse of what is sometimes called "classical idealism" or, somewhat confusingly, "Platonic idealism" due to the influence of Plato's theory of forms (εἶδος eidos or ἰδέα idea), which were not products of our thinking. The material world is ephemeral, but a perfect triangle or "beauty" is eternal. Religious thinking tends to be some form of idealism, as God usually becomes the highest ideal (such as neoplatonism). On this scale, solipsism can be classed as idealism. Thoughts and concepts are all that exist, and furthermore, only the solipsist's own thoughts and consciousness exist. The so-called "reality" is nothing more than an idea that the solipsist has (perhaps unconsciously) created.

=== Cartesian dualism ===
There is another option: the belief that both ideals and "reality" exist. Dualists commonly argue that the distinction between the mind (or 'ideas') and matter can be proven by employing Leibniz's principle of the identity of indiscernibles, which states that if two things share exactly the same qualities, then they must be identical, as in indistinguishable from each other and therefore one and the same thing. Dualists then attempt to identify attributes of mind that are lacked by matter (such as privacy or intentionality) or vice versa (such as having a certain temperature or electrical charge). One notable application of the identity of indiscernibles was by René Descartes in his Meditations on First Philosophy. Descartes concluded that he could not doubt the existence of himself (the famous cogito ergo sum argument), but that he could doubt the (separate) existence of his body. From this, he inferred that the person Descartes must not be identical to the Descartes body since one possessed a characteristic that the other did not: namely, it could be known to exist. Solipsism agrees with Descartes in this aspect, and goes further: only things that can be known to exist for sure should be considered to exist. The Descartes body could only exist as an idea in the mind of the person Descartes. Descartes and dualism aim to prove the actual existence of reality as opposed to a phantom existence (as well as the existence of God in Descartes' case), using the realm of ideas merely as a starting point, but solipsism usually finds those further arguments unconvincing. The solipsist instead proposes that their own unconscious is the author of all seemingly "external" events from "reality".

=== Philosophy of Schopenhauer ===
The World as Will and Representation is Arthur Schopenhauer's best-known work. Schopenhauer saw the human will as our one window to the world behind the representation, the Kantian thing-in-itself. He believed, therefore, that we could gain knowledge about the thing-in-itself, something Kant said was impossible, since the rest of the relationship between representation and thing-in-itself could be understood by analogy as the relationship between human will and human body.

=== Idealism ===
The idealist philosopher George Berkeley argued that physical objects do not exist independently of the mind that perceives them. An item truly exists only as long as it is observed; otherwise, it is not only meaningless but simply nonexistent. Berkeley does attempt to show things can and do exist apart from the human mind and our perception, but only because there is an all-encompassing Mind in which all "ideas" are perceived – in other words, God, who observes all. Solipsism agrees that nothing exists outside of perception, but would argue that Berkeley falls prey to the egocentric predicament – he can only make his own observations, and thus cannot be truly sure that this God or other people exist to observe "reality". The solipsist would say it is better to disregard the unreliable observations of alleged other people and rely upon the immediate certainty of one's own perceptions.

=== Rationalism ===
Rationalism is the philosophical position that truth is best discovered by the use of reasoning and logic rather than by the use of the senses (see Plato's theory of forms). Solipsism is also skeptical of sense-data.

=== Philosophical zombie ===
The theory of solipsism crosses over with the theory of the philosophical zombie in that other seemingly conscious beings may actually lack true consciousness, instead they only display traits of consciousness to the observer, who may be the only conscious being there is.

=== Philosophy of identity ===
Some philosophers have connected solipsistic ideas with the philosophy of personal identity, as well as Hellie's vertiginous question. Christian List argues that there exists a "quadrilemma" in metaphysics caused by the issues raised by the problem of other minds and Hellie's vertiginous question. He argues that the four metaphysical claims of first-person realism, non-solipsism, non-fragmentation, and one-world cannot all be simultaneously true, and thus believing in both the existence of first-personal facts and a single, unified reality must imply that metaphysical solipsism is true. List has proposed a model he calls the "many-worlds theory of consciousness" as a possible alternative to solipsism.

Caspar Hare has argued for a weak form of solipsism with the concept of egocentric presentism, in which other persons can be conscious, but their experiences are simply not present in the way one's own current experience is. A related concept is perspectival realism, in which things within perceptual awareness have a defining intrinsic property that exists absolutely and not relative to anything, of which several other philosophers have written reviews. Vincent Conitzer has argued for similar ideas on the basis of there being a connection between the A-theory of time and the nature of the self. He argues that one's current perspective could be "metaphysically privileged" on the basis of arguments for A-theory being stronger as arguments for both A-theory and a metaphysically privileged self, and arguments against A-theory are ineffective against this combined position.

=== Philosophy of time ===
In the paper The Personalized A-Theory of Time and Perspective, Vincent Conitzer connects A series and B series theories of time with the metaphysics of first-person perspectives. Conitzer argues that if A-theory is correct, and a given moment of time, i.e. the present, is metaphysically privileged, this implies that a given "I" is also metaphysically privileged in the same way. He argues that arguments for A-theory are more effective as arguments for the combined position of both A-theory and first-person realism, but that arguments for B-theory are ineffective against the combined position. Within Caspar Hare's theory of perspectival realism, Hare points out that arguments in favor of a certain first-person perspective being metaphysically privileged are similar to the arguments made in favor of presentism. According to presentism, if Event A is happening on [insert today's date], A is simply happening (right now), not relative to anything. It could be argued that this is similar to solipsism, in which Experience A is simply present, not relative to anything, as opposed to only being present to you.

=== Falsifiability and testability ===
According to Karl Popper, solipsism is not a falsifiable hypothesis: there does not seem to be an imaginable disproof. According to Popper: a hypothesis that cannot be falsified is not scientific, and a solipsist can observe "the success of sciences" (see also no miracles argument). One critical test is nevertheless to consider the induction from experience that the externally observable world does not seem, at first approach, to be directly manipulable purely by mental energies alone. One can indirectly manipulate the world through the medium of the physical body, but it seems impossible to do so through pure thought (psychokinesis). It might be argued that if the external world were merely a construct of a single consciousness, i.e. the self, it could then follow that the external world should be somehow directly manipulable by that consciousness, and if it is not, then solipsism is false. An argument against this states that this argument is circular and incoherent. It assumes at the beginning a "construct of a single consciousness" meaning something false, and then tries to manipulate the external world that it just assumed was false. Of course this is an impossible task, but it does not disprove solipsism. It is simply poor reasoning when considering pure idealized logic and that is why David Deutsch states that when other scientific methods are used also, (not only logic), solipsism is "indefensible", also when using the simplest explanations: "If, according to the simplest explanation, an entity is complex and autonomous, then that entity is real".

The method of the typical scientist is naturalist: they first assume that the external world exists and can be known. But the scientific method, in the sense of a predict-observe-modify loop, does not require the assumption of an external world. A solipsist may perform a psychological test on themselves, to discern the nature of the reality in their mind – however Deutsch uses this fact to counter-argue: "outer parts" of solipsist, behave independently so they are independent for "narrowly" defined (conscious) self. A solipsist's investigations may not be proper science however, since it would not include the co-operative and communitarian aspects of scientific inquiry that normally serve to diminish bias.

=== Minimalism ===
Solipsism is a form of logical minimalism. Many people are intuitively unconvinced of the nonexistence of the external world from the basic arguments of solipsism, but a solid proof of its existence is not available at present. The central assertion of solipsism rests on the nonexistence of such a proof, and strong solipsism (as opposed to weak solipsism) asserts that no such proof can be made. In this sense, solipsism is logically related to agnosticism in religion: the distinction between believing you do not know, and believing you could not have known.

However, minimality (or parsimony) is not the only logical virtue. A common misapprehension of Occam's razor has it that the simpler theory is always the best. In fact, the principle is that the simpler of two theories of equal explanatory power is to be preferred. In other words: additional "entities" can pay their way with enhanced explanatory power. So the naturalist can claim that, while their world view is more complex, it is more satisfying as an explanation.

=== In infants ===
Some developmental psychologists believe that infants are solipsistic, and that eventually children infer that others have experiences much like theirs and reject solipsism.

=== Hinduism ===
The earliest reference to solipsism is found in the ideas in Hindu philosophy in the Brihadaranyaka Upanishad, dated to early 1st millennium BC. The Upanishad holds consciousness to be the only reality and all actions in the universe are thought to be a result of consciousness assuming infinite forms. After the development of distinct schools of Indian philosophy, Advaita Vedanta and Samkhya schools are thought to have originated concepts similar to solipsism.

==== Advaita Vedanta ====
Advaita is one of the six most known Hindu philosophical systems and literally means "non-duality". Its first great consolidator was Adi Shankaracharya, who continued the work of some of the Upanishadic teachers, and that of his teacher's teacher Gaudapada. By using various arguments, such as the analysis of the three states of experience—wakefulness, dream, and deep sleep, he established the singular reality of Brahman, in which Brahman, the universe and the Atman-consciousness or the Self, were one and the same.

One who sees everything as nothing but the Self, and the Self in everything one sees, such a seer withdraws from nothing. For the enlightened, all that exists is nothing but the Self, so how could any suffering or delusion continue for those who know this oneness?

— Ishopanishad: sloka 6, 7

The concept of the Self in the philosophy of Advaita could be interpreted as solipsism. However, the theological definition of the Self in Advaita protect it from true solipsism as found in the west. Similarly, the Vedantic text Yogavasistha, escapes charge of solipsism because the real "I" is thought to be nothing but the absolute whole looked at through a particular unique point of interest.

It is mentioned in Yoga Vasistha that “…..according to them (we can safely assume that them are present Solipsists) this world is mental in nature. There is no reality other than the ideas of one’s own mind. This view is incorrect, because the world cannot be the content of an individual’s mind. If it were so, an individual would have created and destroyed the world according to his whims. This theory is called atma khyati – the pervasion of the little self (intellect). Yoga Vasistha - Nirvana Prakarana - Uttarardha (Volume - 6) Page 107 by Swami Jyotirmayananda

==== Samkhya and Yoga ====
Samkhya philosophy, which is sometimes seen as the basis of Yogic thought, adopts a view that matter exists independently of individual minds. Representation of an object in an individual mind is held to be a mental approximation of the object in the external world. Therefore, Samkhya chooses representational realism over epistemological solipsism. Having established this distinction between the external world and the mind, Samkhya posits the existence of two metaphysical realities Prakriti (matter) and Purusha (consciousness).

=== Buddhism ===
Some philosophical tenets of Buddhism assert that external reality is an illusion, and can be understood as metaphysical solipsism, but most tenets of Buddhist philosophy, generally hold that the mind and external phenomena are both transient, and that they arise from each other. The mind cannot exist without external phenomena, nor can external phenomena exist without the mind. This relation is known as "dependent arising" (pratityasamutpada).

The Buddha stated, "Within this fathom-long body is the world, the origin of the world, the cessation of the world, and the path leading to the cessation of the world." Whilst not rejecting the occurrence of external phenomena, the Buddha focused on the illusion created within the mind of the perceiver by the process of ascribing permanence to impermanent phenomena, satisfaction to unsatisfying experiences, and a sense of reality to things that were effectively insubstantial.

Mahayana Buddhism also challenges the illusion of the idea that one can experience an 'objective' reality independent of individual perceiving minds.

From the standpoint of Prasangika (a branch of Madhyamaka thought), external objects do exist, but are devoid of any type of inherent identity: "Just as objects of mind do not exist [inherently], mind also does not exist [inherently]". In other words, even though a chair may physically exist, individuals can only experience it through the medium of their own mind, each with their own literal point of view. Therefore, an independent, purely 'objective' reality could never be experienced, and exist because of imputation of a name upon a phenomenon, though the phenomenon can function.

The Yogacara (sometimes translated as "Mind only") school of Buddhist philosophy contends that all human experience is constructed by mind. Some later representatives of one Yogacara subschool (Prajñakaragupta, Ratnakīrti) propounded a form of idealism that has been interpreted as solipsism. A view of this sort is contained in the 11th-century treatise of Ratnakirti, "Refutation of the existence of other minds" (Santanantara dusana), which provides a philosophical refutation of external mind-streams from the Buddhist standpoint of ultimate truth (as distinct from the perspective of everyday reality).

In addition to this, the Bardo Thodol, Tibet's famous book of the dead, repeatedly states that all of reality is a figment of one's perception, although this occurs within the "Bardo" realm (post-mortem). For instance, within the sixth part of the section titled "The Root Verses of the Six Bardos", there appears the following line: "May I recognize whatever appeareth as being mine own thought-forms"; there are many lines in similar ideal.

== Criticism ==
Solipsism as radical subjective idealism has been criticized. Arthur Schopenhauer said "solipsism can only succeed in a madhouse", and Martin Gardner said that "solipsism is madness".

Bertrand Russell wrote that it was "psychologically impossible" to believe in solipsism. "I once received a letter from an eminent logician, Mrs. Christine Ladd-Franklin, saying that she was a solipsist, and was surprised that there were no others. Coming from a logician and a solipsist, her surprise surprised me". He also argues that the logic of solipsism compels one to believe in 'solipsism of the moment' where only the presently existing moment can be said to exist.

John Stuart Mill wrote that one can know of others' minds because "First, they have bodies like me, which I know in my own case, to be the antecedent condition of feelings; and because, secondly, they exhibit the acts, and outward signs, which in my own case I know by experience to be caused by feelings".

== See also ==
- Heinlein's World as Myth
- Alfred Binet
- Anathema
- Antiscience
- Aseity
- Boltzmann brain
- Cartesian doubt
- Centered world
- Cognitive closure (philosophy)
- Consensus reality
- Derealisation
- Dream argument
- Ethical solipsism
- Existential nihilism
- Externism
- False awakening
- Immaterialism
- LaVeyan Satanism
- Metaphysical nihilism
- Mind over matter
- Model-dependent realism
- Object permanence
- Objective idealism
- Open individualism
- Panpsychism
- Personal horizon
- Phaneron
- Phenomenalism
- Philosophical realism
- Primary/secondary quality distinction – John Locke's response to solipsism
- Problem of other minds
- Protagoras of Abdera
- Qualia
- Solipsism syndrome
- Standpoint theory
- Stream of consciousness
- Subjectivity
- The Egg
- The Truman Show delusion
- Vertiginous question
