= Cambridge change =

Cambridge change is a concept within metaphysics which differs from the ordinary conception of change. A Cambridge change occurs when a predicate P is true of object O at this moment (e.g. "Chicago is north of me") but is not true of O the next moment (e.g. "Chicago is south of me"), not because O's bodily constitution is no longer the same, but because some difference in the constitution of an object G (I have moved from Atlanta to Toronto) makes logically necessary the passage of the original predicate from true to not true.

== History ==
The term Cambridge change was coined by Peter Geach in the late 1960s because the influential Cambridge University philosophers Bertrand Russell and J. M. E. McTaggart used examples of such changes in their work.

== Example ==
Last year Mary, who stands five-foot-four, was taller than her five-foot tall, 13-year-old son John; today Mary is shorter than her now five-foot-six, 14-year-old son. Mary has undergone a Cambridge change.

The Cambridge change that Mary has undergone consists in the fact that a predicate true of her last year (taller than John) is not true now, and a predicate not true of her last year (shorter than John) is now true; but the change in the predicates’ truth values is not grounded in any change in her height. By contrast, the change in the truth value of last year's and this year's statement about John's height reflects his growth.

Some philosophers have proposed that a Cambridge change is a change in an individual's extrinsic or relational properties; genuine changes involve intrinsic ones.

== See also ==
- Russellian (or B-theory) change, a special case
