= Centered world =

Metaphysical concept

A centered world, according to David Kellogg Lewis, consists of (1) a possible world, (2) an agent in that world, and (3) a time in that world. The concept of centered worlds has epistemic as well as metaphysical uses; for the latter, the three components of a centered world have connections to theories such as actualism, solipsism (especially egocentric presentism and perspectival realism), and presentism, respectively.

One thought experiment posed by Lewis involves the existence of two gods who are omniscient about all the propositional facts about their worlds. One god lives on top of the tallest mountain and throws manna, while the other lives on top of the coldest mountain and throws thunderbolts. However, Lewis argues that none of the propositional facts about the world inform the gods about which particular god they are, and that this therefore implies the existence of indexical facts about who the world is centered around.
