= Present =

Period of time occurring now

The present also called the present moment, is the period of time that is occurring right now. The present is in contrast to the past, the period of time that has already occurred; and the future, the period of time that has yet to occur.

It is sometimes represented as a hyperplane in space-time, typically called "now", although modern physics demonstrates that such a hyperplane cannot be defined uniquely for observers in relative motion. The present may also be viewed as a duration.

== Historiography ==
Contemporary history describes the historical timeframe immediately relevant to the present time and is a certain perspective of modern history.

== Philosophy and religion ==
Quotations

You shouldn't chase after the past or place expectations on the future. What is past is left behind. The future is as yet unreached. Whatever quality is present you clearly see right there, right there.

— Buddha, Bhaddekaratta Sutta

What we perceive as present is the vivid fringe of memory tinged with anticipation.

— Alfred North Whitehead, The Concept of Nature

=== Philosophy of time ===
"The present" raises the question: "How is it that all sentient beings experience now at the same time?" There is no logical reason why this should be the case and no easy answer to the question. The present moment has also been investigated through the perspective of subjective experience, consisting of continuously changing sensory experiences and mental events, and by contrasting this first-person perspective with third-person objective conceptions of time, such as clock time.

=== In Buddhism ===
Buddhism and many of its associated paradigms emphasize the importance of living in the present moment—being fully aware of what is happening, and not dwelling on the past or worrying about the future. This does not mean that they encourage hedonism, but merely that constant focus on one's mindstream (rather than ruminating on future considerations or past reminiscence) will aid one in relieving suffering. They teach that those who live in the present moment are the happiest. A number of meditative techniques including mindfulness practices aim to help the practiser live in the present moment.

=== Christianity and eternity ===
Christianity views God as being outside of time and, from the divine perspective past, present and future are actualized in the now of eternity. This trans-temporal conception of God has been proposed as a solution to the problem of divine foreknowledge (i.e. how can God know what we will do in the future without us being determined to do it) since at least Boethius. Thomas Aquinas offers the metaphor of a watchman, representing God, standing on a height looking down on a valley to a road where past, present and future, represented by the individuals and their actions strung out along its length, are all visible simultaneously to God. Therefore, God's knowledge is not tied to any particular date.

== Physical science ==
=== Special relativity ===
A visualisation of the present (dark blue plane) and past and future light cones in 2D space.

The original intent of the accompanying light cones diagram was to portray a 3-dimensional object having access to the past, present, and future in the present moment (4th dimension).

It follows from Albert Einstein's Special Theory of Relativity that there is no such thing as absolute simultaneity. When care is taken to operationalise "the present", it follows that the events that can be labeled as "simultaneous" with a given event, can not be in direct cause-effect relationship. Such collections of events are perceived differently by different observers. Instead, when focusing on "now" as the events perceived directly, not as a recollection or a speculation, for a given observer "now" takes the form of the observer's past light cone. The light cone of a given event is objectively defined as the collection of events in causal relationship to that event, but each event has a different associated light cone. One has to conclude that in relativistic models of physics there is no place for "the present" as an absolute element of reality, and only refers to things that are close to us. Einstein phrased this as: "People like us, who believe in physics, know that the distinction between past, present, and future is only a stubbornly persistent illusion".

=== Cosmology ===
In physical cosmology, the present time in the chronology of the universe is estimated at 13.8 billion years after the singularity determining the arrow of time. In terms of the cosmic expansion history, it is in the dark-energy-dominated era, after the universe's matter content has become diluted enough for dark energy to dominate the total energy density. It is also in the universe's Stelliferous Era, after enough time for superclusters to have formed (at about 5 billion years), but before the accelerating expansion of the universe has removed the local supercluster beyond the cosmological horizon (at about 150 billion years).

=== Archaeology, geology, etc. ===
In radiocarbon dating, the "present" is defined as AD 1950.

== Grammar ==
In English grammar, actions are classified according to one of the following twelve verb tenses: past (past, past continuous, past perfect, or past perfect continuous), present (present, present continuous, present perfect, or present perfect continuous), or future (future, future continuous, future perfect, or future perfect continuous). The present tense refers to things that are currently happening or are always the case. For example, in the sentence, "she walks home every day," the verb "walks" is in the present tense because it refers to an action that is regularly occurring in the present circumstances.

Verbs in the present continuous tense indicate actions that are currently happening and will continue for a period of time. In the sentence, "she is walking home," the verb phrase "is walking" is in the present continuous tense because it refers to a current action that will continue until a certain endpoint (when "she" reaches home). Verbs in the present perfect tense indicate actions that started in the past and is completed at the time of speaking. For example, in the sentence, "She has walked home," the verb phrase "has walked" is in the present perfect tense because it describes an action that began in the past and is finished as of the current reference to the action. Finally, verbs in the present perfect continuous tense refer to actions that have been continuing up until the current time, thus combining the characteristics of both the continuous and perfect tenses. An example of a present perfect continuous verb phrase can be found in the sentence, "she has been walking this route for a week now," where "has been walking" indicates an action that was happening continuously in the past and continues to happen continuously in the present.

== See also ==
- Arrow of time
- Contemporary history
- Deixis
- Near real-time computing
- Observation
- Philosophical presentism
- Self
- Specious present
- Time perception
