= Past =

Events that occurred before a given time point

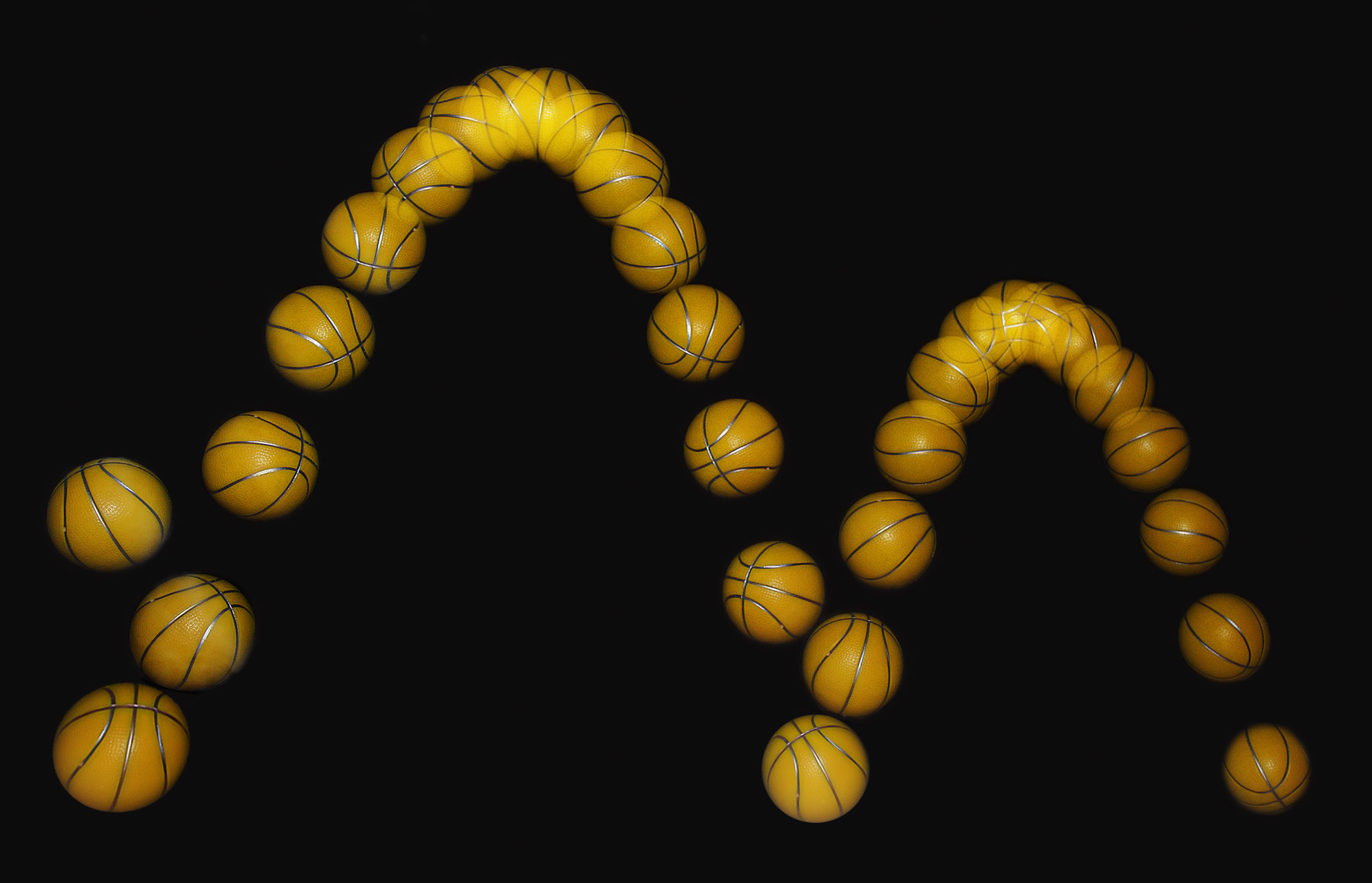
A picture of a basketball bouncing, composed of frames taken at different points in the past

The past is the set of all events that occurred before a given point in time. The past is contrasted with and defined by the present and the future. The concept of the past is derived from the linear fashion in which human observers experience time, and is accessed through memory and recollection. In addition, humans have recorded the past since the advent of written language.

In English, the word past was one of the many variant forms and spellings of passed, the past participle of the Middle English verb passen (whence Modern English pass), among ypassed, ypassyd, i-passed, passyd, passid, pass'd, paste, etc. It developed into an adjective and preposition in the 14th century, and a noun (as in the past or a past, through ellipsis with the adjective past) in the 15th century.

== Grammar ==
Sometimes, the past is visualized by scaling a fraction of all of the past to a timespan people are more familiar with. In the case of Cosmic Calendars, the chronology of the universe, including the history of Earth, is compressed onto a single year.

In English grammar, actions are classified according to one of the following twelve verb tenses: past (past, uses of English verb forms, past perfect, or past perfect continuous), present (present, present continuous, present perfect, or present perfect continuous), or future (future, future continuous, future perfect, or future perfect continuous). The past tense refers to actions that have already happened. For example, "she is walking" refers to a girl who is currently walking (present tense), while "she walked" refers to a girl who was walking before now (past tense).

The past continuous tense refers to actions that continued for a period of time, as in the sentence "she was walking," which describes an action that was still happening in a prior window of time to which a speaker is presently referring. The past perfect tense is used to describe actions that were already completed by a specific point in the past. For example, "she had walked" describes an action that took place in the past and was also completed in the past.

The past perfects continuous tense refers to an action that was happening up until a particular point in the past but was completed. It is different from the past perfect tense because the emphasis of past perfect continuous verbs is not on the action having been completed by the present moment, but rather on its having taken place actively over a time period before another moment in the past. The verb tense used in the sentence "She had been walking in the park regularly before I met her" is past perfect continuous because it describes an action ("walking") that was actively happening before a time when something else in the past was happening (when "I met her").

Depending on its usage in a sentence, "past" can be described using a variety of terms. Synonyms for "past" as an adjective include, "former," "bygone," "earlier," "preceding," and "previous." Synonyms for "past" as a noun include, "history, "background," "life story," and "biography." Synonyms of "past" as a preposition include, "in front of," "beyond," "by," and "in excess of."

== Other uses ==
The word "past" can also be used to describe the offices of those who have previously served in an organization, group, or event such as, "past president," or, "past champions." "Past" can also refer to something or someone being at or in a position that is further than a particular point. For instance, in the sentence, "I live on Fielding Road, just past the train station," the word "past" is used to describe a location (the speaker's residence) beyond a certain point (the train station). Alternatively, the sentence, "He ran past us at full speed," utilizes the concept of the past to describe the position of someone ("He") that is further than the speaker.

The "past" is also used to define a time that is a certain number of minute before or after a particular hour, as in "We left the party at half-past twelve." People also use "past" to refer to being beyond a particular biological age or phase of being, as in, "The boy was past the age of needing a babysitter," or, "I'm past caring about that problem." The "past" is commonly used to refer to history, either generally or with regard to specific time periods or events, as in, "Past monarchs had absolute power to determine the law in contrast to many European Kings and Queens of today."

Nineteenth-century British author Charles Dickens created one of the best-known fictional personifications of the "past" in his short book, "A Christmas Carol." In the story, the Ghost of Christmas Past is an apparition that shows the main character, a cold-hearted and tight-fisted man named Ebenezer Scrooge, vignettes from his childhood and early adult life to teach him that joy does not necessarily come from wealth.

== Fields of study ==
The past is the object of study within such fields as time, life, history, nostalgia, archaeology, archaeoastronomy, chronology, astronomy, physics, geology, historical geology, historical linguistics, ontology, paleontology, paleobotany, paleoethnobotany, palaeogeography, paleoclimatology, etymology and physical cosmology.

== See also ==
- Antiquarian
- Archaism
- Artifact
- Cultural heritage
- Deep time
- Flashback
- Historic preservation
- Memory
- Museum
- Nostalgia
- Past tense
- Philosophy of space and time
- Recollection
- Retro style
- Thoughts of the Past
