= Growing block universe =

Past and present exist while the future does not

The growing block universe (GBU; also the growing block view) is a theory of time arguing that the past and present both exist, while the future does not yet exist. The present is the perpetuating factor of time, where new moments are added to the past. By the passage of time more of the world comes into being; therefore, the block universe is said to be growing. The growth of the block is supposed to happen in the present, a very thin slice of spacetime, where more of spacetime is continually coming into being. Growing block theory should not be confused with block universe theory, also known as eternalism.

The growing block view is an alternative to both eternalism (according to which past, present, and future all exist) and presentism (according to which only the present exists). It is held to be closer to common-sense intuitions than the alternatives. C. D. Broad was a proponent of the theory (1923). Some modern defenders are Michael Tooley (in 1997) and Peter Forrest (in 2004), George Ellis (2009), Bernard Carr (2017), Carl Gunther (2006) and Graeme A Forbes (2025). Fabrice Correia and Sven Rosenkranz (2015) have developed their own distinctive view of this theory. In related theories Henri Bergson (1886) proposed that memory does not reside in the brain but an extended dimension of time. Rupert Sheldrake's theory of morphic resonance involves the permanence of past events which reappear as morphic fields that structure both the material and mental dimensions.

== Overview ==
Broad first proposed the theory in 1923. He described the theory as follows:

It will be observed that such a theory as this accepts the reality of the present and the past, but holds that the future is simply nothing at all. Nothing has happened to the present by becoming past except that fresh slices of existence have been added to the total history of the world. The past is thus as real as the present. On the other hand, the essence of a present event is, not that it precedes future events, but that there is quite literally nothing to which it has the relation of precedence. The sum total of existence is always increasing, and it is this which gives the time-series a sense as well as an order. A moment t is later than a moment t' if the sum total of existence at t includes the sum total of existence at t' together with something more.

This dynamic theory of time conforms with the common-sense intuition that the past is fixed, the future is unreal, and the present is constantly changing. The theory resolves the paradox that time has a beginning but does not seem to have an end. There are also other reasons for supporting the growing block view of time that go beyond the common-sense. For example, Tooley bases his argument on the causal relation. His main argument as outlined by Dainton is as follows:

- Events in our world are causally related.
- The causal relation is inherently asymmetrical. Effects depend on their causes in a way that causes do not depend on their effects.
- This asymmetry is only possible if a cause's effects are not real as of the time of their cause.
- Causes occur before their effects. "X is earlier than Y" means roughly that some event simultaneous with X causes some event simultaneous with Y.
- Our universe must therefore be a growing block.

Belief in a greater dimension of time holding the permanence of the past is not new. In ancient Indian philosophies, time is rarely seen as a linear arrow. Instead, doctrines across Hinduism, Buddhism, and Jainism view time as cyclical and eternal. In these belief systems, the past never truly vanishes: rather events transform and persist infinitely in a greater cosmic or multidimensional reality.

Among modern cosmologists, George F. R. Ellis proposes the past and present exist as the EBU's fixed block of time, but the future is open, unreal. In this crystallizing block universe, as the "present" moves forward, the quantum wave function probabilities become certainties and collapse into the defined past events of classical certainty. The EBU continually provides the changing context for the quantum uncertainty of the material world which continually leads to classical outcomes as Contextual Wavefunction Collapse takes place. Physical entities such as atoms, rocks, tables, animals, etc., have properties such as position, velocity, mass, momentum, and charge which can be measured experimentally. We observe their existence today because we can see and feel them. Their presence in the past is the reason they exist today, and that is true for each moment as time passes.

Ellis argues that the events which occurred deep in the past continually structure the present moment. In the evolution of the Universe, nuclear reactions in the interior of stars billions of years ago produced elements such as carbon, nitrogen, and oxygen found on the Earth today. The properties of these structures extend not only through the familiar dimensions of space, but also through the dimension of time. If they did not exist in this way, we would have no cause for their existence today. The conservation laws that are integrability conditions for equations of motion guarantee they existed in the past, which is why they exist today. Further, Ellis believes the physics models that omit an objective present and treat the universe as a purely static, four-dimensional block--where the "flow" of time is merely an illusion--fail to account for the reality of human experience and cause-and-effect.

Bernard Carr, English physicist, cosmologist, and protegee of Stephen Hawking, proposes an evolving block universe (EBU) which is a hybrid model of time that combines elements of the traditional, static 4D "block universe" (where all points in time are equally real) with the dynamic concept that the future does not yet exist. Carr proposes this model to reconcile the rigidity of general relativity with the human experience of the passage of time and the quantum mechanical need for a "present" where events become fixed.

Carr has explored the EBU in the context of linking cosmology with philosophy and the nature of consciousness. Carr proposes that consciousness is a fundamental feature of the universe rather than a byproduct of the brain. In his view, the brain acts as a "filter" or receiver that limits pre-existing consciousness and mental phenomena that occur in higher spatial dimensions described by string and M-theory. Carr's proposed "mental" dimension complements the theory of Nobel Prize neurophysiologist John Eccles and philosopher Karl Popper's theory of "Three Worlds" which contains the physical dimension, the mental, and their intersection.

Carr proposes that the EBU is a five-dimensional structure with the fifth dimension corresponding to mental time. The present is not just a subjective experience but an objective "boundary" or "edge" of the block where new space-time continuously comes into being. Carr's theory has similarity to Henri Bergson's view that our consciousness understands the present moment from the perspective of memory that does not reside in the brain but extends broadly through the dimension of time which holds the entirety of our previous conscious experiences.

Biologist and philosopher Rupert Sheldrake presents the theory morphic resonance in his book Morphic Resonance: The Nature of Formative Causation (originally titled A New Science of Life). His theory is aligned with the view that patterns of organization in self-organizing systems which occurred in the past can influence similar self-organizing systems in the present but the future remains open and unwritten. Sheldrake maintains that these "morphic fields" continually emerge from the past to structure the living and nonliving worlds. He characterizes morphic fields as dynamically forming "habits" that produce the Universe's continual evolution, creativity, and interconnectedness.

Carl Gunther in his book Chasing Memory, Exploring the Dimension of Conscious Mind, proposes the GBU answer the bewilderment Erwin Schrodinger expressed in the classic What is Life? at the extraordinary mechanical regularity of life's expanding, molecular dynamic which has produced the uniformity of each species of plant and animal for many millions of years. Gunther proposes that Schrodinger's "aperiodic crystals" which structure the metabolic processes that operate cells and build an organism are actually hyperdimensional "worldlines" or "animate fields" of molecular force and form that are crystalized within the GBU. These multidimensional forms resonate with the quantum realm of a cell's molecules to provide the invisible structure that isolates and insulates molecules, governs their interactions, and transports them into the global architecture of a species' anatomy composed of cells, tissues, organs, and systems.

Further, Gunther argues that the structure of human memory correspond to the GBU's chronological and spatial structure and transcends the brain's synaptic network. In recall of an event, he proposes that consciousness stretches broadly through the GBU's hyperdimensional volume to the actual previous conscious experience with its visual, mental, and emotional content. To support this possibility, Gunther examines the complex, inborn instinctive behaviors of honey bees, spiders, and birds. He maintains that the hyperdimensional complexities of the memory processes which build a bee or spider, seamlessly operate its legs and body, construct its honey combs or webs, and provides it coherent understanding of its world vastly exceeds the explanatory capacity of DNA and the electromagnetic force--science's only acknowledge force of molecular interaction. In contrast, he maintains GBU's multidimensional volume which hold each species' worldlines of common memory corresponds to what is observed.

Graeme A Forbes, in his book The Growing-Block View, presents the GBU as the best way to make sense of the following two commitments:

1. That time passes in a way space does not (i.e. time is dynamic)
2. That the future is open in a way the past is fixed

He argues that the passage of time is a change from potentiality to actuality in accordance with the laws of nature. The past exists, and is actual, the future does not exist; it is merely potential of what actually exists. The present is both actual and potential; present things have some existence but the potential for continuation. The counterfactual is neither potential nor actual; it perhaps once had potential, but no longer.

== Criticism ==
In the 21st century, several philosophers, such as David Braddon-Mitchell (2004), Craig Bourne, and Trenton Merricks, observed that if the growing block view is correct then it must be concluded that it is unknown whether now is now. The first occurrence of "now" is an indexical and the second occurrence of "now" is the objective tensed property. Their observation implies the following sentence: "This part of spacetime has the property of being present." For example, Socrates discussing in the past with Gorgias, and at the same time thinking that the discussion is occurring now. According to the growing block view, tense is a real property of the world so his thought is about now, the objective present. He thinks tenselessly that his thought is occurring on the edge of being but is wrong because he is in the past; he does not know that now is now, yet how can one be sure they are not in the same position. As there is nothing special with Socrates, it cannot be known whether now is now. Some argued that there is an ontological distinction between the past and the present. For instance, Forrest (2004) and Forbes (2015) argue that although there exists a past, it is lifeless and inactive. Consciousness, as well as the flow of time, is not active within the past and can only occur at the boundary of the block universe in which the present exists in all existence.

This theory is often held to be in conflict with special relativity, where the notion of the present depends on the resting reference frame. The objection is that there is no physically meaningful (and plausible) way of specifying a objective, uniquely present 'hyperplane' across the universe. Note that the objection from special relativity relies on the difficulty of establishing simultaneity, not on whether there is change over time, or a difference between what's in your past light-cone and your future light-cone.

== See also ==
- An Experiment with Time, which proposes a similar concept
- Eternity
- Philosophy of space and time

== Bibliography ==
- Broad, C. D. (1923). Scientific Thought (pdf). New York: Harcourt, Brace and Co.
- Tooley, Michael (1997). Time, Tense, and Causation (PDF). Oxford University Press. ISBN 9780198235798. Archived from the original (PDF) on 6 October 2016.
- Bourne, Craig (2002). "When am I?". Australasian Journal of Philosophy. 80 (3): 359–71. doi:10.1080/713659472. hdl:2299/8627. S2CID 169173490.
- Braddon-Mitchell, David (2004). "How do we know it is now now?". Analysis. 64 (283): 199–203. doi:10.1111/j.0003-2638.2004.00485.x.
- Forbes, Graeme A (2025). The Growing-Block View: Philosophy of Time, Change and the pen Future. Bloomsbury Academic: London. ISBN 9781350504325
- Forrest, Peter (2004). "The real but dead past: a reply to Braddon-Mitchell". Analysis. 64 (284): 358–62. doi:10.1111/j.0003-2638.2004.00510.x.
- Merricks, Trenton (2006). Zimmerman, Dean (ed.). Good-Bye Growing Block (PDF). Oxford Studies in Metaphysics. Vol. 2. Oxford University Press. p. 103. ISBN 9780199290598.
- Carr, Bernard (2017). Black Holes, Cosmology, and the Passage of Time: Three Problems at the Limits of Science. Published in the book Philosophy of Cosmology. Cambridge University Press.
- Carr, Bernard (2025). Black Holes and Cosmology: Linking Physics Philosophy, and Theology. Research Gate publication 398155696.
- Ellis, George F. R. (2009). Time and Spacetime: the Crystallizing Block Universe. arxiv.org/abs/0912.0808
- Ellis, George F. R. (2014). The Evolving Block Universe and the Meshing Together of Times arxiv.org/pdf/1407.7243.
- Ellis, George F. R. (2016). How Can Physics Underlie the Mind? Top-Down Causation in the Human Context, Frontiers Collection
- Gunther, Carl (2006). The Vital Dimension, iUniverse.
- Gunther, Carl (2012). Mind Memory Time: A Quest into the Nature of Reality, Odin Press.
- Gunther, Carl (2024). Chasing Memory: Exploring the Dimension of Conscious Mind, Odin Press.
- Putnam, Hilary (1967). "Time and physical geometry" Journal of Philosophy, 64(8):240-247
- Sheldrake, Rupert(1988). The Presence of the Past: Morphic Resonance and the Habits of Nature, Times Book in the United States and Collins in the United Kingdom.
- Schrodinger, Erwin (1944). What is Life? The Physical Aspect of the Living Cell. Cambridge University Press.
