= Perspectival realism =

Theory by Caspar Hare

An abstract diagram depicting reality as being "centered" around a specific individual

In Caspar Hare's theory of perspectival realism, there is a defining intrinsic property that the things that are in perceptual awareness have. Consider seeing object A but not object B. Of course, we can say that the visual experience of A is present to you, and no visual experience of B is present to you. But, it can be argued, this misses the fact that the visual experience of A is simply present, not relative to anything. This is what Hare's perspectival realism attempts to capture, resulting in a weak version of metaphysical solipsism.

As Hare points out, the same type of argument is often used in the philosophy of time to support theories such as presentism. Of course, we can say that A is happening on [insert today's date]. But, it can be argued, this misses the fact that A is simply happening (right now), not relative to anything.

Hare's theory of perspectival realism is closely related to his theory of egocentric presentism. Several other philosophers have written reviews of Hare's work on this topic.

== See also ==
- Metaphysical subjectivism
- Centered worlds
- Benj Hellie's vertiginous question
- J.J. Valberg's personal horizon
