= Egocentric presentism =

Form of solipsism

An abstract diagram depicting reality as being "centered" on a specific individual.

Egocentric presentism is a form of solipsism introduced by Caspar Hare in which other persons can be conscious, but their experiences are simply not present.

Similarly, in related work, Hare argues for a theory of perspectival realism in which other perspectives do exist, but the present perspective has a defining intrinsic property.

In one example that Hare uses to illustrate his theory (starting on page 354 of the official version of his paper), you learn that you are one of two people, named A and B, who have just been in a train crash; and that A is about to have incredibly painful surgery. You cannot remember your name. According to Hare, naturally, you hope to be B. The point of the example is that you know everything relevant that there is to know about the objective world; all that is missing is your position in it, that is, whose experiences are present, A's or B's. This example is easily handled by egocentric presentism because under this theory, the case where the present experiences are A's is fundamentally different from the case where the present experiences are B's. Hare points out that similar examples can be given to support theories like presentism in the philosophy of time.

Several other philosophers have written reviews of Hare's work on this topic. Giovanni Merlo has given a detailed comparison to his own closely related subjectivist theory.

Vincent Conitzer is another philosopher who has discussed similar ideas. In the paper "The Personalized A-Theory of Time and Perspective", Conitzer makes the case that the metaphysics of the self are connected to the metaphysics of time. He argues that arguments in favor of the A-theory of time are more effective as arguments for the combined position of both A-theory being true and the "I" being metaphysically privileged from other perspectives.

== See also ==
- Benj Hellie's vertiginous question
- J. J. Valberg's personal horizon
- Centered world
- Further facts
- Indexicality
- Presentism (historical analysis)
- The Egg (Weir short story)
