= Philosophical presentism =

View that neither the future nor the past exist, only the present

Presentism (sometimes 'philosophical presentism') is the view of time which states that only present entities exist (or, equivalently, that everything which is exists presently) and what is present (i.e., what exists) changes as time passes. According to presentism, there are no past or future entities at all, though some entities have existed and other entities will exist. In a sense, the past and the future do not exist for presentists—past events have happened (have existed, or have been present) and future events will happen (will exist, or will be present), but neither exist at all since they do not exist now. Presentism is a view about temporal ontology, i.e., a view about what exists in time, that contrasts with eternalism—the view that past, present and future entities exist (that is, the ontological thesis of the 'block universe')—and with no-futurism—the view that only past and present entities exist (that is, the ontological thesis of the 'growing block universe').

== Historical antecedents ==
Augustine of Hippo proposed that the present is analogous to a knife edge placed exactly between the perceived past and the imaginary future and does not include the concept of time. Proponents claim this should be self-evident because, if the present is extended, it must have separate parts. These parts must be simultaneous if they are truly a part of the present. According to early philosophers, time cannot be simultaneously past and present and hence not extended. Contrary to Saint Augustine, some philosophers propose that conscious experience is extended in time. For instance, William James said that time is "the short duration of which we are immediately and incessantly sensible". H. Scott Hestevlod has argued for (but not endorsed) the idea that presentists may grant the present some duration, whereas the eternalists may not. Other early presentist philosophers include the Indian Buddhist tradition. Fyodor Shcherbatskoy, a leading scholar of the modern era on Buddhist philosophy, has written extensively on Buddhist presentism: "Everything past is unreal, everything future is unreal, everything imagined, absent, mental... is unreal. Ultimately, real is only the present moment of physical efficiency [i.e., causation]."

According to J. M. E. McTaggart's "The Unreality of Time", there are two ways of referring to events: the 'A Series' (or 'tensed time': yesterday, today, tomorrow) and the 'B Series' (or 'untensed time': Monday, Tuesday, Wednesday). Presentism posits that the A Series is fundamental and that the B Series alone is not sufficient. Presentists maintain that temporal discourse requires the use of tenses, whereas the "Old B-Theorists" argued that tensed language could be reduced to tenseless facts (Dyke, 2004). Note that presentism is a thesis about what exists in time, rather than what time is like. The A-series does not necessarily entail presentism nor vice versa. Tim Maudlin is described (although not by himself) as an A-theorist and an eternalist, although this is an uncommon combination.

Arthur N. Prior has argued against un-tensed theories with the following ideas: the meaning of statements such as "Thank goodness that's over" is much easier to see in a tensed theory with a distinguished, present now. Similar arguments can be made to support the theory of egocentric presentism (or perspectival realism), which holds that there is a distinguished, present self. Vincent Conitzer has made a similar argument connecting A-theory with the vertiginous question. According to Conitzer, arguments in favor of A-theory are more effective as arguments for the combined position of both A-theory being true and the "I" being metaphysically privileged from other perspectives.

== Philosophical objections ==
One main objection to presentism comes from the idea that what is true substantively depends upon what exists (or, that truth depends or 'supervenes' upon being). According to this critique, presentism is said to be in conflict with truth-maker theory. Truth-maker theory looks to capture the dependence of truth upon being with the idea that truths (e.g., true propositions) are true in virtue of the existence of some entity or entities ('truth-makers'). The conflict arises because most presentists accept that there are evidence-transcendent and objective truths about the past (and some accept that there are truths about the future, pace concerns about fatalism), but presentists deny the existence of the past and the future. For instance, most presentists accept that it is true that Marie Curie discovered polonium, but they deny that the event of her discovery exists (because it is a wholly past event). Since the mid-1990s, truth-maker theorists have been trying to accuse Presentists with violating their principle (that truths require truth-makers) and ontologically 'cheating'. To resolve the truth-maker theorists' counter, presentists can argue that there are truth-makers for the past, but they either exist presently or outside of time. For a second option, some presentists posit the existence of "atemporal" objects which function as truth-makers, though some justification would be needed for how something outside of time would not conflict with the proposition that only present entities exist.

Presentists can as well reject that propositions about the past are made true by truth-makers. However, this leaves unclear what exactly makes truths about the past true. As a result, few philosophers support this method of resolving the objection.

== Ersatz Presentism ==
Presentists who say there are truth-making, "atemporal" entities (atemporal in a similar sense as numbers) endorse a view called "ersatz presentism". These ersatz (German for "substitute"/"alternative") presentists believe that the truth of propositions about the past like "Churchill existed" are made true by a theoretical time which is a representation of how things were (i.e., ersatz rather than concrete).

Ersatz times are, in a sense, akin to ersatz possible worlds. Alyssa Ney describes ersatz modal realism as positing "that there are possible worlds (worlds that can play a similar role to the concrete worlds of the modal realist), but that these are not additional universes in the same sense as our universe". In a similar way, ersatz times would exist, but not in the same sense that actual time currently exists. Rather, they would be theoretical times which represent the moment when in which the proposition was true. Ersatz presentists must, though, postulate an ordering relationship between ersatz times which is equivalent to an earlier/later-than relation (such that t1 is later than t2).

For example, when ersatz presentists claim "Churchill existed", such a proposition is true only if a) there is an ersatz time (t2) which represents the present time and b) there is an ersatz time which represents (t1) a prior time when Churchill existed. For the ersatz presentist, the theoretical ersatz times ground or make true propositions about the past. As a result of postulating presently existing entities which ground past entities, ersatz presentists do not need to accept the existence of anything which does not presently exist in order to explain the distinction between consecutive moments.

== Relativity ==
Many philosophers have argued that relativity implies eternalism, the idea that the past and future exist in a real sense, not only as changes that occurred or will occur to the present. Philosopher of science Dean Rickles disagrees with some qualifications, but notes that "the consensus among philosophers seems to be that special and general relativity are incompatible with presentism". Some philosophers view time as a dimension equal to spatial dimensions, that future events are "already there" in the same sense different places exist, and that there is no objective flow of time; however, this view is disputed. Since relativity has been confirmed by experiment, and it posits that time is a coordinate or "dimension" between two points in spacetime, it gave rise to a philosophical viewpoint known as four dimensionalism. This view treats time as another dimension, just like space, but does not eliminate it.

The bar and ring paradox is an example of the relativity of simultaneity. Both ends of the bar pass through the ring simultaneously in the rest frame of the ring (left), but the ends of the bar pass one after the other in the rest frame of the bar (right).

Observers in motion with respect to each other are said to be in different frames of reference. These observers may disagree on whether two events at different locations occurred simultaneously, which is referred to as the relativity of simultaneity.

Presentism in classical spacetime deems that only the present exists; this is not reconcilable with the relativity of simultaneity in special relativity, shown in the following example: Alice and Bob are simultaneous observers of event O. For Alice, some event E is simultaneous with O, but for Bob, event E is in the past or future. Therefore, Alice and Bob disagree about what exists in the present, which contradicts classical presentism. "Here-now presentism" attempts to reconcile this by only acknowledging the time and space of a single point; this is unsatisfactory because objects coming and going from the "here-now" alternate between real and unreal, in addition to the lack of a privileged "here-now" that would be the "real" present. "Relativized presentism" acknowledges that there are infinite frames of reference, each of them having a different set of simultaneous events, which makes it impossible to distinguish a single "real" present, and hence either all events in time are real—blurring the difference between presentism and eternalism—or each frame of reference exists in its own reality. Options for presentism in special relativity appear to be exhausted, but Gödel and others suspect presentism may be valid for some forms of general relativity. Generally, the idea of absolute time and space is considered incompatible with general relativity; there is no universal truth about the absolute position of events which occur at different times, and thus no way to determine which point in space at one time is at the universal "same position" at another time, and all coordinate systems are on equal footing as given by the principle of diffeomorphism invariance.

== See also ==
- A-series and B-series
- Appeal to novelty
- Arrow of time
- Centered worlds
- Endurantism
- Eternity
- Growing block universe
- Perdurantism
- Problem of future contingents
- Specious present
