= Time =

Continuous progression from past to future

Time is the continuous progression of existence that occurs in an apparently irreversible succession from the past, through the present, and into the future. Time dictates all forms of action, age, and causality, being a component quantity of various measurements used to sequence events, to compare the duration of events or the intervals between them, and to quantify rates of change of quantities in material reality or in conscious experience. Time is often referred to as the fourth dimension and the temporal dimension, in addition to the three spatial dimensions.

Time is primarily measured in linear spans or periods, ordered from shortest to longest. Practical, human-scale measurements of time are performed using clocks and calendars, reflecting a 24-hour day collected into a 365-day year linked to the astronomical motion of the Earth. Scientific measurements of time instead vary from Planck time at the shortest to billions of years at the longest. Measurable time is believed to have effectively begun with the Big Bang 13.8 billion years ago, encompassed by the chronology of the universe. Modern physics understands time to be inextricable from space within the concept of spacetime described by general relativity. Time can therefore be dilated by velocity and matter to pass faster or slower for an external observer, though this is considered negligible outside of extreme conditions, namely relativistic speeds or the gravitational pulls of black holes.

Throughout history, time has been an important subject of study in religion, philosophy, and science. Temporal measurement has occupied scientists and technologists, and has been a prime motivation in navigation and astronomy. Time is also of significant social importance, having economic value ("time is money") as well as personal value, due to an awareness of the limited time in each day ("carpe diem") and in human life spans.

== Definition ==
The concept of time can be complex. Multiple notions exist, and defining time in a manner applicable to all fields without circularity has consistently eluded scholars. Nevertheless, diverse fields such as business, industry, sports, the sciences, and the performing arts all incorporate some notion of time into their respective measuring systems. Traditional definitions of time involved the observation of periodic motion such as the apparent motion of the sun across the sky, the phases of the moon, and the passage of a free-swinging pendulum. More modern systems include the Global Positioning System, other satellite systems, Coordinated Universal Time and mean solar time. Although these systems differ from one another, with careful measurements they can be synchronized.

In physics, time is a fundamental concept to define other quantities, such as velocity. To avoid a circular definition, time in physics is operationally defined as "what a clock reads", specifically a count of repeating events such as the SI second. Although this aids in practical measurements, it does not address the essence of time. Physicists developed the concept of the spacetime continuum, where events are assigned four coordinates: three for space and one for time. Events like particle collisions, supernovas, or rocket launches have coordinates that may vary for different observers, making concepts like "now" and "here" relative. In general relativity, these coordinates do not directly correspond to the causal structure of events. Instead, the spacetime interval is calculated and classified as either space-like or time-like, depending on whether an observer exists that would say the events are separated by space or by time. Since the time required for light to travel a specific distance is the same for all observers—a fact first publicly demonstrated by the Michelson–Morley experiment—all observers will consistently agree on this definition of time as a causal relation.

General relativity does not address the nature of time for extremely small intervals where quantum mechanics holds. In quantum mechanics, time is treated as a universal and absolute parameter, differing from general relativity's notion of independent clocks. The problem of time consists of reconciling these two theories. As of 2026, there is no generally accepted theory of quantum general relativity.

== Measurement ==
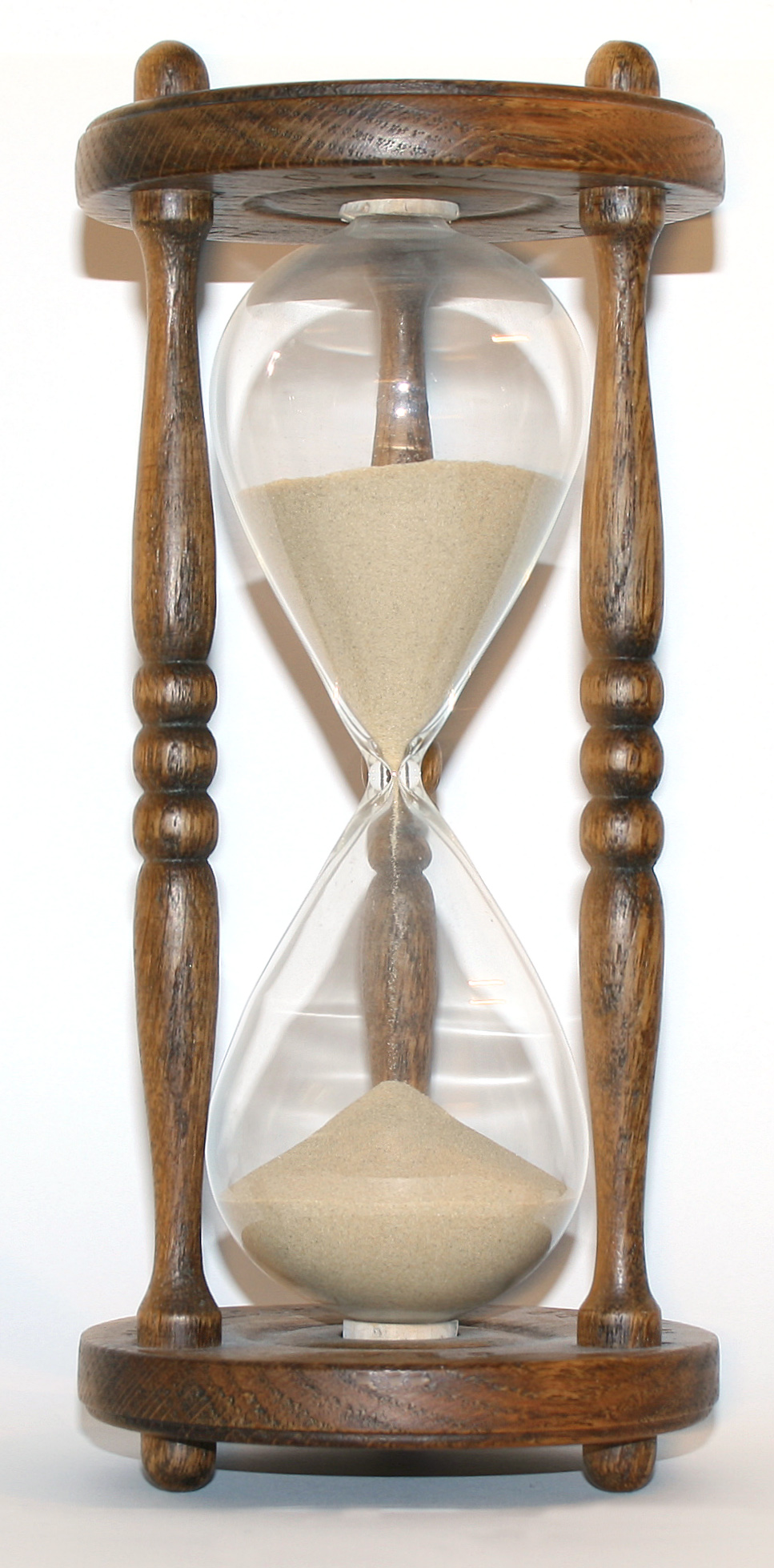
The flow of sand in an hourglass can be used to measure the passage of one hour of time. It also concretely represents the present as being between the past and the future.

Methods of temporal measurement, or chronometry, generally take two forms. The first is a calendar, a mathematical tool for organising intervals of time on Earth, consulted for periods longer than a day. The second is a clock, a physical mechanism that indicates the passage of time, consulted for periods less than a day. The combined measurement marks a specific moment in time from a reference point, or epoch.

Time is one of the seven fundamental physical quantities in both the International System of Units (SI) and International System of Quantities. The SI base unit of time is the second, which is defined by measuring the electronic transition frequency of caesium atoms.

In international standards such as IEC 60050, a distinction is often made among:

- instant: a point in time;
- time interval: an interval delimited by two instants;
- duration: the size of a time interval.

=== History of the calendar ===
Artifacts from the Paleolithic suggest that the moon was being used to reckon time by at least 6,000 years ago. Lunar calendars were among the first to appear, with years of either 12 or 13 lunar months (either 354 or 384 days). Without intercalation to add days or months to some years, seasons quickly drift in a calendar based solely on twelve lunar months. Lunisolar calendars have a thirteenth month added to some years to make up for the difference between a full year (now known to be about 365.24 days) and a year of just twelve lunar months. The numbers twelve and thirteen came to feature prominently in many cultures, at least partly due to this relationship of months to years.

Other early forms of calendars originated in Mesoamerica, particularly in ancient Mayan civilization, in which they developed the Maya calendar, consisting of multiple interrelated calendars. These calendars were religiously and astronomically based; the Haab' calendar has 18 months in a year and 20 days in a month, plus five epagomenal days at the end of the year. In conjunction, the Maya also used a 260-day sacred calendar called the Tzolk'in.

The reforms of Julius Caesar in 45 BC put the Roman world on a solar calendar. This Julian calendar was faulty in that its intercalation still allowed the astronomical solstices and equinoxes to advance against it by about 11 minutes per year. Pope Gregory XIII introduced a correction in 1582; the Gregorian calendar was only slowly adopted by different nations over a period of centuries, but it is now by far the most commonly used calendar around the world.

During the French Revolution, a new clock and calendar were invented as part of the dechristianization of France and to create a more rational system in order to replace the Gregorian calendar. The French Republican Calendar's days consisted of ten hours of a hundred minutes of a hundred seconds, which marked a deviation from the base 12 (duodecimal) system used in many other devices by many cultures. The system was abolished in 1806.

=== History of other devices ===
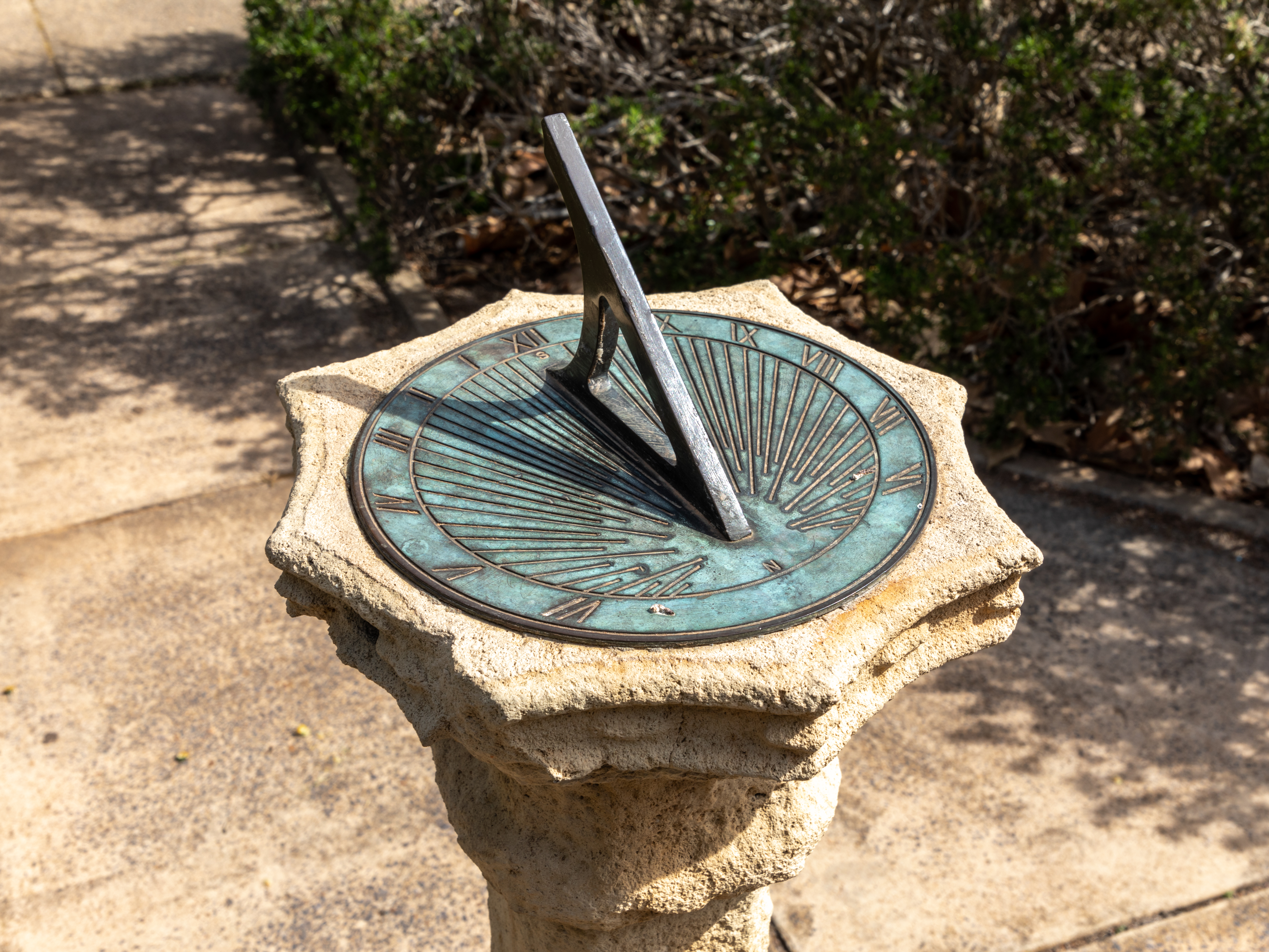
Horizontal sundial in Canberra

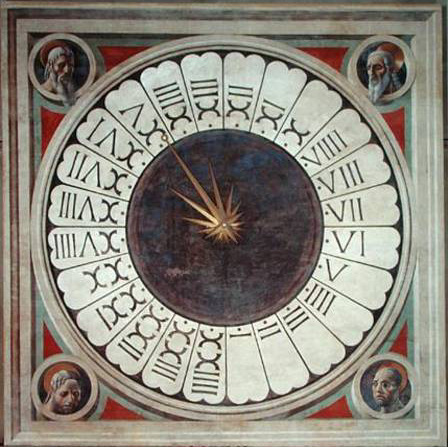
24-hour clock face in Florence

A large variety of devices have been invented to measure time. The study of these devices is called horology. They can be driven by a variety of means, including gravity, springs, and various forms of electrical power, and regulated by a variety of means.

A sundial is any device that uses the direction of sunlight to cast shadows from a gnomon onto a set of markings calibrated to indicate the local time, usually to the hour. The idea to separate the day into smaller parts is credited to Egyptians because of their sundials, which operated on a duodecimal system. The importance of the number 12 is due to the number of lunar cycles in a year and the number of stars used to count the passage of night. Obelisks made as a gnomon were built as early as c. 3500 BC. An Egyptian device that dates to c. 1500 BC, similar in shape to a bent T-square, also measured the passage of time from the shadow cast by its crossbar on a nonlinear rule. The T was oriented eastward in the mornings. At noon, the device was turned around so that it could cast its shadow in the evening direction.

Alarm clocks reportedly first appeared in ancient Greece c. 250 BC with a water clock made by Plato that would set off a whistle. The hydraulic alarm worked by gradually filling a series of vessels with water. After some time, the water emptied out of a siphon. Inventor Ctesibius revised Plato's design; the water clock uses a float as the power drive system and uses a sundial to correct the water flow rate.

In medieval philosophical writings, the atom was a unit of time referred to as the smallest possible division of time. The earliest known occurrence in English is in Byrhtferth's Enchiridion (a science text) of 1010–1012, where it was defined as 1/564 of a momentum (1 1/2 minutes), and thus equal to 15/94 of a second. It was used in the computus, the process of calculating the date of Easter. The most precise timekeeping device of the ancient world was the water clock, or clepsydra, one of which was found in the tomb of Egyptian pharaoh Amenhotep I. They could be used to measure the hours even at night but required manual upkeep to replenish the flow of water. The ancient Greeks and the people from Chaldea (southeastern Mesopotamia) regularly maintained timekeeping records as an essential part of their astronomical observations. Arab inventors and engineers, in particular, made improvements on the use of water clocks up to the Middle Ages. In the 11th century, Chinese inventors and engineers invented the first mechanical clocks driven by an escapement mechanism.

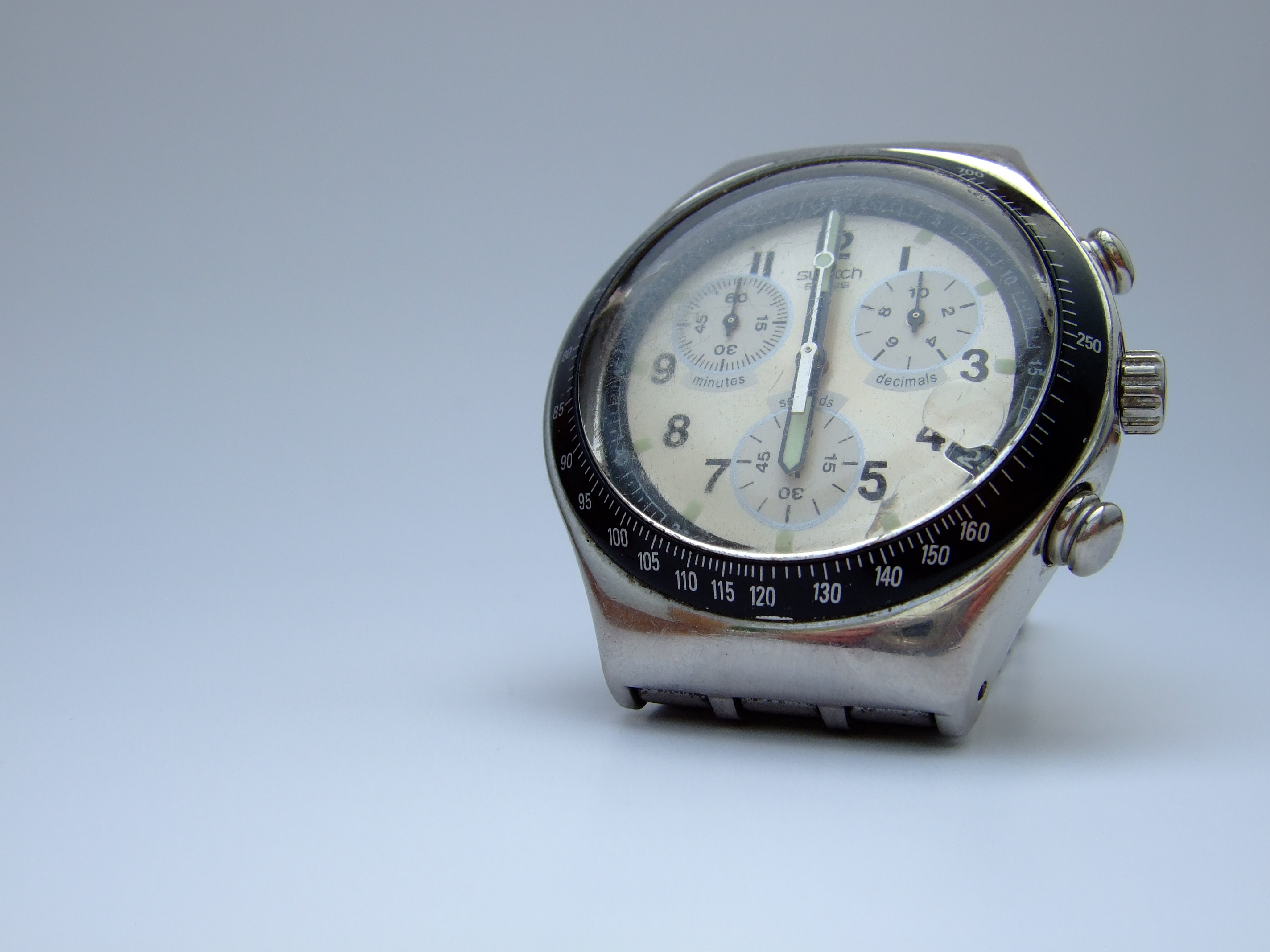
A contemporary quartz watch, 2007

Incense sticks and candles were, and are, commonly used to measure time in temples and churches across the globe. Water clocks, and, later, mechanical clocks, were used to mark the events of the abbeys and monasteries of the Middle Ages. The passage of the hours at sea can also be marked by bell. The hours were marked by bells in abbeys as well as at sea. Richard of Wallingford (1292–1336), abbot of St. Alban's abbey, famously built a mechanical clock as an astronomical orrery about 1330. The hourglass uses the flow of sand to measure the flow of time. They were also used in navigation. Ferdinand Magellan used 18 glasses on each ship for his circumnavigation of the globe (1522). The English word clock probably comes from the Middle Dutch word klocke which, in turn, derives from the medieval Latin word clocca, which ultimately derives from Celtic and is cognate with French, Latin, and German words that mean bell.

Great advances in accurate time-keeping were made by Galileo Galilei and especially Christiaan Huygens with the invention of pendulum-driven clocks along with the invention of the minute hand by Jost Burgi. There is also a clock that was designed to keep time for 10,000 years called the Clock of the Long Now. Alarm clock devices were later mechanized. Levi Hutchins's alarm clock has been credited as the first American alarm clock, though it can only ring at 4 a.m. Antoine Redier was also credited as the first person to patent an adjustable mechanical alarm clock in 1847. Digital forms of alarm clocks became more accessible through digitization and integration with other technologies, such as smartphones.

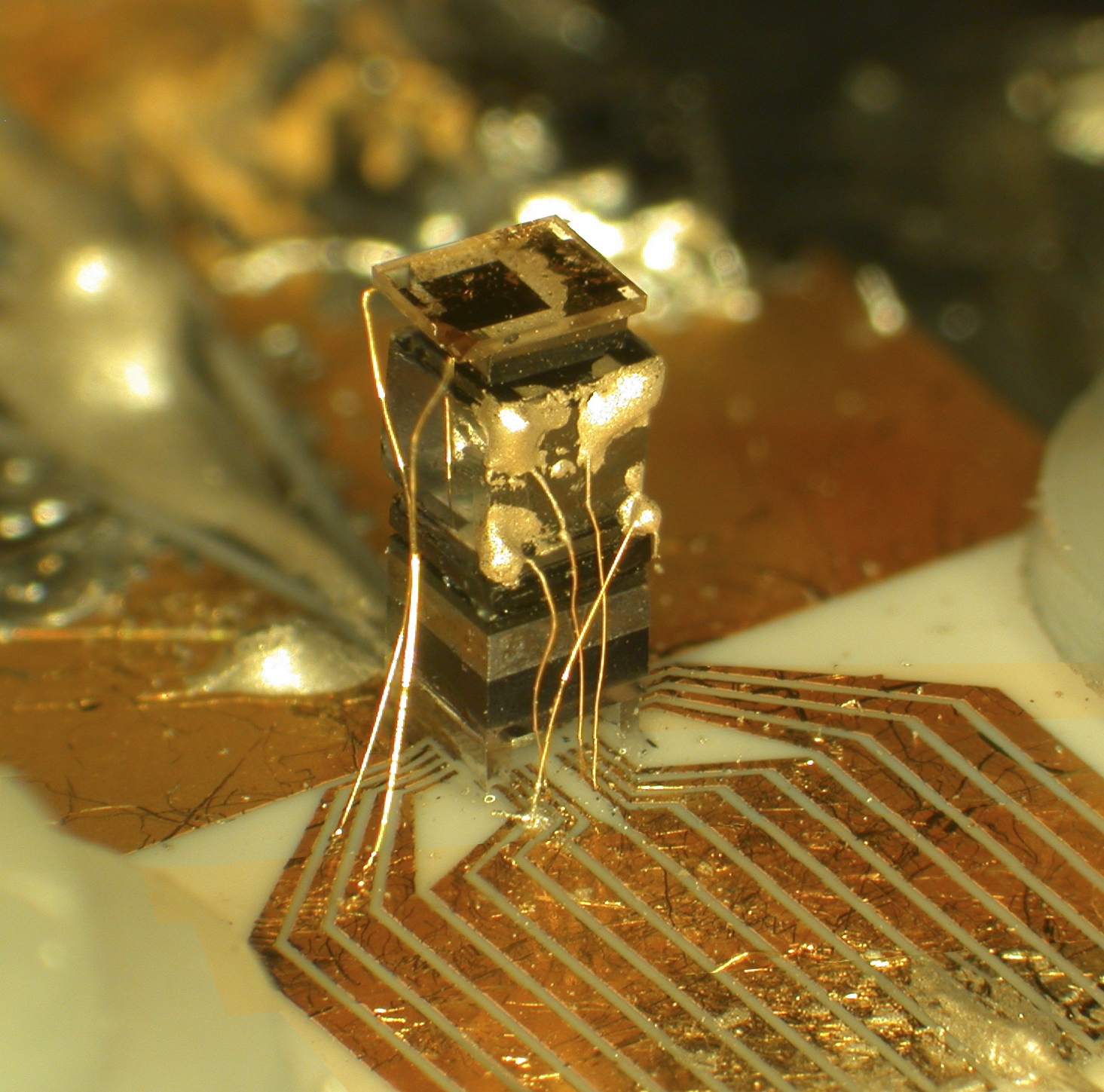
Chip-scale atomic clocks, such as this one unveiled in 2004, are expected to greatly improve GPS location.

The most accurate timekeeping devices are atomic clocks, which are accurate to seconds in many millions of years, and are used to calibrate other clocks and timekeeping instruments. Atomic clocks use the frequency of electronic transitions in certain atoms to measure the second. One of the atoms used is caesium; most modern atomic clocks probe caesium with microwaves to determine the frequency of these electron vibrations. Since 1967, the International System of Measurements bases its unit of time, the second, on the properties of caesium atoms. SI defines the second as 9,192,631,770 cycles of the radiation that corresponds to the transition between two electron spin energy levels of the ground state of the ^{133}Cs atom. A portable timekeeper that meets certain precision standards is called a chronometer. Initially, the term was used to refer to the marine chronometer, a timepiece used to determine longitude by means of celestial navigation, a precision first achieved by John Harrison. More recently, the term has also been applied to the chronometer watch, a watch that meets precision standards set by the Swiss agency COSC.

In modern times, the Global Positioning System in coordination with the Network Time Protocol can be used to synchronize timekeeping systems across the globe. As of May 2010, the smallest time interval uncertainty in direct measurements is on the order of 12 attoseconds (1.2 × 10^{−17} seconds), about 3.7 × 10^{26} Planck times. The time measured was the delay caused by out-of-sync electron waves' interference patterns.

=== Units ===
The second (s) is the SI base unit. A minute (min) is 60 seconds in length (or, rarely, 59 or 61 seconds when leap seconds are employed), and an hour is 60 minutes or 3600 seconds in length. A day is usually 24 hours or 86,400 seconds in length; however, the duration of a calendar day can vary due to daylight saving time and leap seconds.

=== Standards ===
A time standard is a specification for measuring time: assigning a number or calendar date to an instant (point in time), quantifying the duration of a time interval, and establishing a chronology (ordering of events). In modern times, several time specifications have been officially recognized as standards, where formerly they were matters of custom and practice. The invention in 1955 of the caesium atomic clock has led to the replacement of older and purely astronomical time standards such as sidereal time and ephemeris time, for most practical purposes, by newer time standards based wholly or partly on atomic time using the SI second.

International Atomic Time (TAI) is the primary international time standard from which other time standards are calculated. Universal Time (UT1) is mean solar time at 0° longitude, computed from astronomical observations. It varies from TAI because of the irregularities in Earth's rotation. Coordinated Universal Time (UTC) is an atomic time scale designed to approximate Universal Time. UTC differs from TAI by an integral number of seconds. Until 2026 UTC was kept within 0.9 second of UT1 by the introduction of one-second steps to UTC, the leap second. The Global Positioning System broadcasts a very precise time signal based on UTC time.

The surface of the Earth is split into a number of time zones. Standard time or civil time in a time zone deviates a fixed, round amount, usually a whole number of hours, from some form of Universal Time, usually UTC. Most time zones are exactly one hour apart, and by convention compute their local time as an offset from UTC. For example, time zones at sea are based on UTC. In many locations (but not at sea) these offsets vary twice yearly due to daylight saving time transitions.

Some other time standards are used mainly for scientific work. Terrestrial Time is a theoretical ideal scale realized by TAI. Geocentric Coordinate Time and Barycentric Coordinate Time are scales defined as coordinate times in the context of the general theory of relativity, with TCG applying to Earth's center and TCB to the solar system's barycenter. Barycentric Dynamical Time is an older relativistic scale related to TCB that is still in use.

== Philosophy ==
=== Religion ===
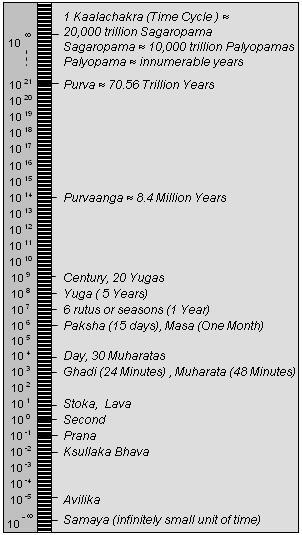
Scale of time in Jain texts shown logarithmically

==== Cyclical views of time ====
Many ancient cultures, particularly in the East, had a cyclical view of time. In these traditions, time was often seen as a recurring pattern of ages or cycles, where events and phenomena repeated themselves in a predictable manner. One of the most famous examples of this concept is found in Hindu philosophy, where time is depicted as a wheel called the "Kalachakra" or "Wheel of Time." According to this belief, the universe undergoes endless cycles of creation, preservation, and destruction.

Similarly, in other ancient cultures such as those of the Mayans, Aztecs, and Chinese, there were also beliefs in cyclical time, often associated with astronomical observations and calendars. These cultures developed complex systems to track time, seasons, and celestial movements, reflecting their understanding of cyclical patterns in nature and the universe.

The cyclical view of time contrasts with the linear concept of time more common in Western thought, where time is seen as progressing in a straight line from past to future without repetition.

==== Time in Abrahamic religions ====
Jewish, Christian, and Islamic world-views generally regard time as linear and directional, beginning with the act of creation by God.

In the Hebrew Bible book, Ecclesiastes (Kohelet), traditionally attributed to King Solomon (“Shlomo Hamelech” or שְׁלֹמֹה הַמֶּלֶךְ in Hebrew) (970–928 BC), time is depicted as cyclical and beyond human control. Ecclesiastes 3:1 states, “To everything there is a season, and a time to every purpose under the heaven.”

The traditional Christian view sees time ending, teleologically, with the eschatological end of the present order of things, the "end time". However, some Christian theologians (such as Augustine of Hippo and Aquinas) believe that God is outside of time, seeing all events simultaneously, that time did not exist before God, and that God created time.

==== Time in Greek mythology ====
The Greek language denotes two distinct principles, Chronos and Kairos. The former refers to numeric, or chronological, time. The latter, literally "the right or opportune moment", relates specifically to metaphysical or Divine time. In theology, Kairos is qualitative, as opposed to quantitative.

In Greek mythology, Chronos (ancient Greek: Χρόνος) is identified as the personification of time. His name in Greek means "time" and is alternatively spelled Chronus (Latin spelling) or Khronos. Chronos is usually portrayed as an old, wise man with a long, gray beard, such as "Father Time". Some English words whose etymological root is khronos/chronos include chronology, chronometer, chronic, anachronism, synchronise, and chronicle.

==== Time in Kabbalah & Rabbinical thought ====
Rabbis sometimes saw time like "an accordion that was expanded and collapsed at will." According to Kabbalists, "time" is a paradox and an illusion.

==== Time in Advaita Vedanta ====
According to Advaita Vedanta, time is integral to the phenomenal world, which lacks independent reality. Time and the phenomenal world are products of maya, influenced by our senses, concepts, and imaginations. The phenomenal world, including time, is seen as impermanent and characterized by plurality, suffering, conflict, and division. Since phenomenal existence is dominated by temporality (kala), everything within time is subject to change and decay. Overcoming pain and death requires knowledge that transcends temporal existence and reveals its eternal foundation.

=== In Western philosophy ===
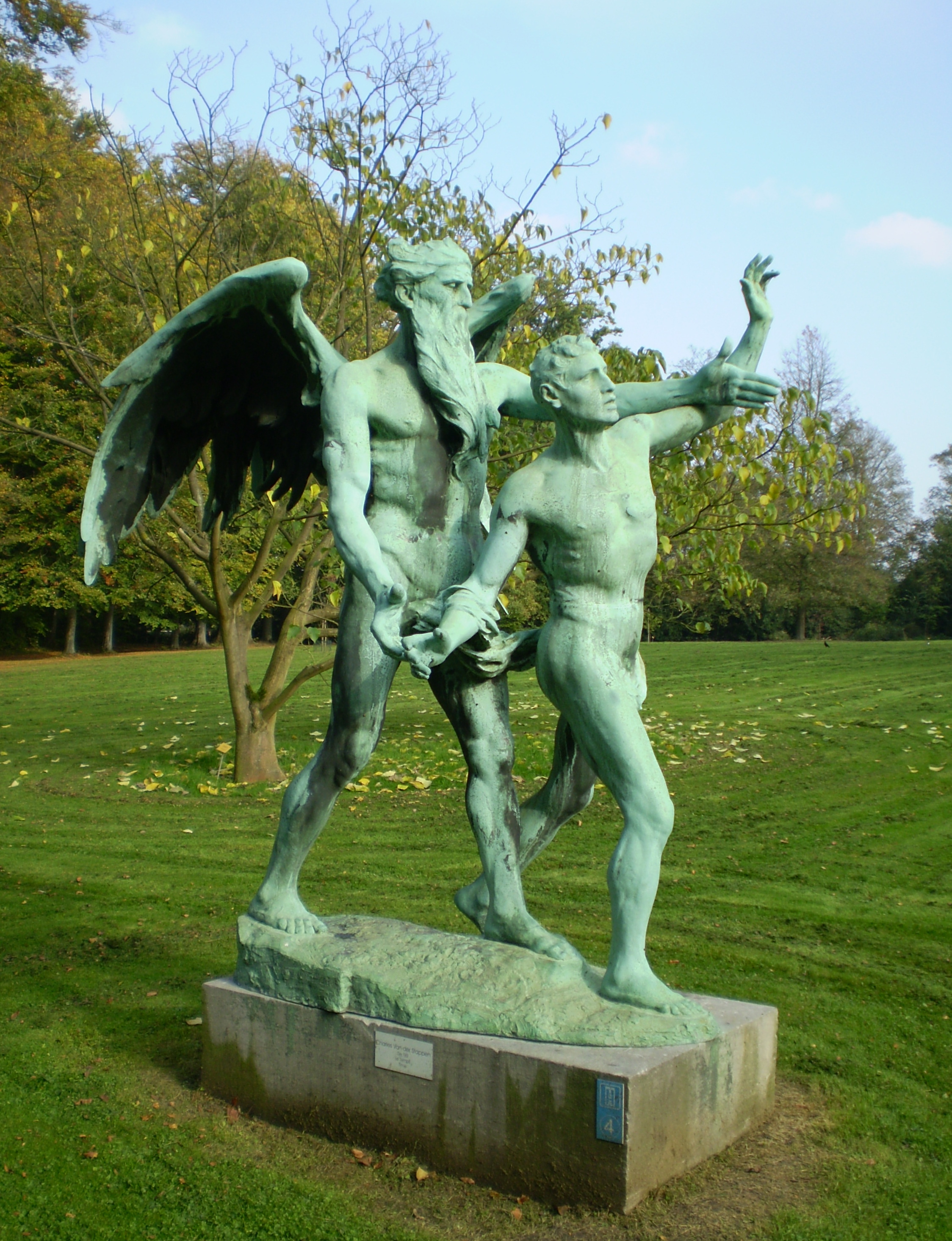
Time's mortal aspect is personified in this bronze statue by Charles van der Stappen.

Two contrasting viewpoints on time divide prominent philosophers. One view is that time is part of the fundamental structure of the universe—a dimension independent of events, in which events occur in sequence. Isaac Newton subscribed to this realist view, and hence it is sometimes referred to as Newtonian time.

The opposing view is that time does not refer to any kind of "container" that events and objects "move through", nor to any entity that "flows", but that it is instead part of a fundamental intellectual structure (together with space and number) within which humans sequence and compare events. This second view, in the tradition of Gottfried Leibniz and Immanuel Kant, holds that time is neither an event nor a thing, and thus is not itself measurable nor can it be travelled. Furthermore, it may be that there is a subjective component to time, but whether or not time itself is "felt", as a sensation, or is a judgment, is a matter of debate.

In philosophy, time was questioned throughout the centuries; what time is and if it is real or not. Ancient Greek philosophers asked if time was linear or cyclical and if time was endless or finite. These philosophers had different ways of explaining time; for instance, ancient Indian philosophers had something called the Wheel of Time. It is believed that there was repeating ages over the lifespan of the universe. This led to beliefs like cycles of rebirth and reincarnation. The Greek philosophers believe that the universe was infinite, and was an illusion to humans. Plato believed that time was made by the Creator at the same instant as the heavens. He also says that time is a period of motion of the heavenly bodies. Aristotle believed that time correlated to movement, that time did not exist on its own but was relative to motion of objects. He also believed that time was related to the motion of celestial bodies; the reason that humans can tell time was because of orbital periods and therefore there was a duration on time.

The Vedas, the earliest texts on Indian philosophy and Hindu philosophy dating to the late 2nd millennium BC, describe ancient Hindu cosmology, in which the universe goes through repeated cycles of creation, destruction and rebirth, with each cycle lasting 4,320 million years. Ancient Greek philosophers, including Parmenides and Heraclitus, wrote essays on the nature of time. Plato, in the Timaeus, identified time with the period of motion of the heavenly bodies. Aristotle, in Book IV of his Physica defined time as 'number of movement in respect of the before and after'. In Book 11 of his Confessions, St. Augustine of Hippo ruminates on the nature of time, asking, "What then is time? If no one asks me, I know: if I wish to explain it to one that asketh, I know not." He begins to define time by what it is not rather than what it is, an approach similar to that taken in other negative definitions. However, Augustine ends up calling time a "distention" of the mind (Confessions 11.26) by which we simultaneously grasp the past in memory, the present by attention, and the future by expectation.

Philosophers in the 17th and 18th century questioned if time was real and absolute, or if it was an intellectual concept that humans use to understand and sequence events. These questions lead to realism vs anti-realism; the realists believed that time is a fundamental part of the universe, and be perceived by events happening in a sequence, in a dimension. Isaac Newton said that we are merely occupying time, he also says that humans can only understand relative time. Isaac Newton believed in absolute space and absolute time; Leibniz believed that time and space are relational. The differences between Leibniz's and Newton's interpretations came to a head in the famous Leibniz–Clarke correspondence. Relative time is a measurement of objects in motion. The anti-realists believed that time is merely a convenient intellectual concept for humans to understand events. This means that time was useless unless there were objects that it could interact with, this was called relational time. René Descartes, John Locke, and David Hume said that one's mind needs to acknowledge time, in order to understand what time is. Immanuel Kant believed that we can not know what something is unless we experience it first hand.

Time is not an empirical concept. For neither co-existence nor succession would be perceived by us, if the representation of time did not exist as a foundation a priori. Without this presupposition, we could not represent to ourselves that things exist together at one and the same time, or at different times, that is, contemporaneously, or in succession.

— Immanuel Kant, Critique of Pure Reason (1781), trans. Vasilis Politis (London: Dent., 1991), p. 54.

Immanuel Kant, in the Critique of Pure Reason, described time as an a priori intuition that allows us (together with the other a priori intuition, space) to comprehend sense experience. With Kant, neither space nor time are conceived as substances, but rather both are elements of a systematic mental framework that necessarily structures the experiences of any rational agent, or observing subject. Kant thought of time as a fundamental part of an abstract conceptual framework, together with space and number, within which we sequence events, quantify their duration, and compare the motions of objects. In this view, time does not refer to any kind of entity that "flows," that objects "move through," or that is a "container" for events. Spatial measurements are used to quantify the extent of and distances between objects, and temporal measurements are used to quantify the durations of and between events. Time was designated by Kant as the purest possible schema of a pure concept or category.

Henri Bergson believed that time was neither a real homogeneous medium nor a mental construct, but possesses what he referred to as Duration. Duration, in Bergson's view, was creativity and memory as an essential component of reality.

According to Martin Heidegger we do not exist inside time, we are time. Hence, the relationship to the past is a present awareness of having been, which allows the past to exist in the present. The relationship to the future is the state of anticipating a potential possibility, task, or engagement. It is related to the human propensity for caring and being concerned, which causes "being ahead of oneself" when thinking of a pending occurrence. Therefore, this concern for a potential occurrence also allows the future to exist in the present. The present becomes an experience, which is qualitative instead of quantitative. Heidegger seems to think this is the way that a linear relationship with time, or temporal existence, is broken or transcended. We are not stuck in sequential time. We are able to remember the past and project into the future; we have a kind of random access to our representation of temporal existence; we can, in our thoughts, step out of (ecstasis) sequential time.

Modern era philosophers asked: is time real or unreal, is time happening all at once or a duration, is time tensed or tenseless, and is there a future to be? There is a theory called the tenseless or B-theory; this theory says that any tensed terminology can be replaced with tenseless terminology. For example, "we will win the game" can be replaced with "we do win the game", taking out the future tense. On the other hand, there is a theory called the tense or A-theory; this theory says that our language has tense verbs for a reason and that the future can not be determined. There is also something called imaginary time, this was from Stephen Hawking, who said that space and imaginary time are finite but have no boundaries. Imaginary time is not real or unreal, it is something that is hard to visualize. Philosophers can agree that physical time exists outside of the human mind and is objective, and psychological time is mind-dependent and subjective.

=== Unreality ===
In 5th century BC Greece, Antiphon the Sophist, in a fragment preserved from his chief work On Truth, held that: "Time is not a reality (hypostasis), but a concept (noêma) or a measure (metron)." Parmenides went further, maintaining that time, motion, and change were illusions, leading to the paradoxes of his follower Zeno. Time as an illusion is also a common theme in Buddhist thought.

These arguments often center on what it means for something to be unreal. Modern physicists generally believe that time is as real as space—though others, such as Julian Barbour, argue quantum equations of the universe take their true form when expressed in the timeless realm containing every possible now or momentary configuration of the universe. J. M. E. McTaggart's 1908 article The Unreality of Time argues that, since every event has the characteristic of being both present and not present (i.e., future or past), that time is a self-contradictory idea.

Another modern philosophical theory called presentism views the past and the future as human-mind interpretations of movement instead of real parts of time (or "dimensions") which coexist with the present. This theory rejects the existence of all direct interaction with the past or the future, holding only the present as tangible. This is one of the philosophical arguments against time travel. This contrasts with eternalism (all time: present, past and future, is real) and the growing block theory (the present and the past are real, but the future is not).

== Physical definition ==
Until Einstein's reinterpretation of the physical concepts associated with time and space in 1907, time was considered to be the same everywhere in the universe, with all observers measuring the same time interval for any event. Non-relativistic classical mechanics is based on this Newtonian idea of time. Einstein, in his special theory of relativity, postulated the constancy and finiteness of the speed of light for all observers. He showed that this postulate, together with a reasonable definition for what it means for two events to be simultaneous, requires that distances appear compressed and time intervals appear lengthened for events associated with objects in motion relative to an inertial observer.

The theory of special relativity finds a convenient formulation in Minkowski spacetime, a mathematical structure that combines three dimensions of space with a single dimension of time. In this formalism, distances in space can be measured by how long light takes to travel that distance, e.g., a light-year is a measure of distance, and a meter is now defined in terms of how far light travels in a certain amount of time. Two events in Minkowski spacetime are separated by an invariant interval, which can be either space-like, light-like, or time-like. Events that have a time-like separation cannot be simultaneous in any frame of reference, there must be a temporal component (and possibly a spatial one) to their separation. Events that have a space-like separation will be simultaneous in some frame of reference, and there is no frame of reference in which they do not have a spatial separation. Different observers may calculate different distances and different time intervals between two events, but the invariant interval between the events is independent of the observer and their velocity.

=== Arrow of time ===
Unlike space, where an object can travel in the opposite directions (and in 3 dimensions), time appears to have only one dimension and only one direction—the past lies behind, fixed and immutable, while the future lies ahead and is not necessarily fixed. Yet most laws of physics allow any process to proceed both forward and in reverse. There are only a few physical phenomena that violate the reversibility of time. This time directionality is known as the arrow of time. Acknowledged examples of the arrow of time are:

1. Radiative arrow of time, manifested in waves (e.g., light and sound) travelling only expanding (rather than focusing) in time (see light cone)
2. Entropic arrow of time: according to the second law of thermodynamics an isolated system evolves toward a larger disorder rather than orders spontaneously
3. Quantum arrow time, which is related to irreversibility of measurement in quantum mechanics according to the Copenhagen interpretation of quantum mechanics
4. Weak arrow of time: preference for a certain time direction of weak force in particle physics (see violation of CP symmetry)
5. Cosmological arrow of time, which follows the accelerated expansion of the Universe after the Big Bang

The relationships between these different arrows of time is a hotly debated topic in theoretical physics.

The second law of thermodynamics states that entropy must increase over time. Brian Greene theorizes that, according to the equations, the change in entropy occurs symmetrically whether going forward or backward in time. So entropy tends to increase in either direction, and our current low-entropy universe is a statistical aberration, in a similar manner as tossing a coin often enough that eventually heads will result ten times in a row. However, this theory is not supported empirically in local experiment.

=== Classical mechanics ===
Two-dimensional space depicted in three-dimensional spacetime. The past and future light cones are absolute, the "present" is a relative concept different for observers in relative motion.

In non-relativistic classical mechanics, Newton's concept of "relative, apparent, and common time" can be used in the formulation of a prescription for the synchronization of clocks. Events seen by two different observers in motion relative to each other produce a mathematical concept of time that works sufficiently well for describing the everyday phenomena of most people's experience. In the late nineteenth century, physicists encountered problems with the classical understanding of time, in connection with the behavior of electricity and magnetism. The 1860s Maxwell's equations described that light always travels at a constant speed (in a vacuum). However, classical mechanics assumed that motion was measured relative to a fixed reference frame. The Michelson–Morley experiment contradicted the assumption. Einstein later proposed a method of synchronizing clocks using the constant, finite speed of light as the maximum signal velocity. This led directly to the conclusion that observers in motion relative to one another measure different elapsed times for the same event.

=== Spacetime ===
Time has historically been closely related with space, the two together merging into spacetime in Einstein's special relativity and general relativity. According to these theories, the concept of time depends on the spatial reference frame of the observer, and the human perception, as well as the measurement by instruments such as clocks, are different for observers in relative motion. For example, if a spaceship carrying a clock flies through space at (very nearly) the speed of light, its crew does not notice a change in the speed of time on board their vessel because everything traveling at the same speed slows down at the same rate (including the clock, the crew's thought processes, and the functions of their bodies). However, to a stationary observer watching the spaceship fly by, the spaceship appears flattened in the direction it is traveling and the clock on board the spaceship appears to move very slowly.

On the other hand, the crew on board the spaceship also perceives the observer as slowed down and flattened along the spaceship's direction of travel, because both are moving at very nearly the speed of light relative to each other. Because the outside universe appears flattened to the spaceship, the crew perceives themselves as quickly traveling between regions of space that (to the stationary observer) are many light years apart. This is reconciled by the fact that the crew's perception of time is different from the stationary observer's; what seems like seconds to the crew might be hundreds of years to the stationary observer. In either case, however, causality remains unchanged: the past is the set of events that can send light signals to an entity and the future is the set of events to which an entity can send light signals.

=== Dilation ===
Relativity of simultaneity: Event B is simultaneous with A in the green reference frame, but it occurred before in the blue frame, and occurs later in the red frame.

Einstein showed in his thought experiments that people travelling at different speeds, while agreeing on cause and effect, measure different time separations between events, and can even observe different chronological orderings between non-causally related events. Though these effects are typically minute in the human experience, the effect becomes much more pronounced for objects moving at speeds approaching the speed of light. Subatomic particles exist for a well-known average fraction of a second in a lab relatively at rest, but when travelling close to the speed of light they are measured to travel farther and exist for much longer than when at rest.

According to the special theory of relativity, in the high-speed particle's frame of reference, it exists, on the average, for a standard amount of time known as its mean lifetime, and the distance it travels in that time is zero, because its velocity is zero. Relative to a frame of reference at rest, time seems to "slow down" for the particle. Relative to the high-speed particle, distances seem to shorten. Einstein showed how both temporal and spatial dimensions can be altered (or "warped") by high-speed motion.

Einstein (The Meaning of Relativity): "Two events taking place at the points A and B of a system K are simultaneous if they appear at the same instant when observed from the middle point, M, of the interval AB. Time is then defined as the ensemble of the indications of similar clocks, at rest relative to K, which register the same simultaneously." Einstein wrote in his book, Relativity, that simultaneity is also relative, i.e., two events that appear simultaneous to an observer in a particular inertial reference frame need not be judged as simultaneous by a second observer in a different inertial frame of reference.

According to general relativity, time also runs slower in stronger gravitational fields; this is gravitational time dilation. The effect of the dilation becomes more noticeable in a mass-dense object. A famous example of time dilation is a thought experiment of a subject approaching the event horizon of a black hole. As a consequence of how gravitational fields warp spacetime, the subject will experience gravitational time dilation. From the perspective of the subject itself, they will experience time normally. Meanwhile, an observer from the outside will see the subject move closer to the black hole until the extreme, in which the subject appears 'frozen' in time and eventually fades to nothingness due to the diminishing amount of light returning.

=== Relativistic versus Newtonian ===
Views of spacetime along the world line of a rapidly accelerating observer in a relativistic universe. The events ("dots") that pass the two diagonal lines in the bottom half of the image (the past light cone of the observer in the origin) are the events visible to the observer.

The animations visualise the different treatments of time in the Newtonian and the relativistic descriptions. At the heart of these differences are the Galilean and Lorentz transformations applicable in the Newtonian and relativistic theories, respectively. In the figures, the vertical direction indicates time. The horizontal direction indicates distance (only one spatial dimension is taken into account), and the thick dashed curve is the spacetime trajectory ("world line") of the observer. The small dots indicate specific (past and future) events in spacetime. The slope of the world line (deviation from being vertical) gives the relative velocity to the observer.

In the Newtonian description these changes are such that time is absolute: the movements of the observer do not influence whether an event occurs in the 'now' (i.e., whether an event passes the horizontal line through the observer). However, in the relativistic description the observability of events is absolute: the movements of the observer do not influence whether an event passes the "light cone" of the observer. Notice that with the change from a Newtonian to a relativistic description, the concept of absolute time is no longer applicable: events move up and down in the figure depending on the acceleration of the observer.

=== Quantization ===
Time quantization is a hypothetical concept that time has a smallest possible unit. In the modern established physical theories like the Standard Model of particle physics and general relativity, time is not quantized. Planck time (c. 5.4 × 10^{−44} seconds) is the unit of time in the system of natural units known as Planck units. Current established physical theories are believed to fail at this time scale, and many physicists expect that the Planck time might be the smallest unit of time that could ever be measured, even in principle. Though tentative physical theories that attempt to describe phenomena at this scale exist; an example is loop quantum gravity. Loop quantum gravity suggests that time is quantized; if gravity is quantized, spacetime is also quantized.

== Travel ==
Time travel is the concept of moving backwards or forwards to different points in time, in a manner analogous to moving through space, and different from the normal "flow" of time to an earthbound observer. In this view, all points in time (including future times) "persist" in some way. Time travel has been a plot device in fiction since the 19th century. Travelling backwards or forwards in time has never been verified as a process, and doing so presents many theoretical problems and contradictory logic which to date have not been overcome. Any technological device, whether fictional or hypothetical, that is used to achieve time travel is known as a time machine.

A central problem with time travel to the past is the violation of causality; should an effect precede its cause, it would give rise to the possibility of a temporal paradox. Some interpretations of time travel resolve this by accepting the possibility of travel between branch points, parallel realities, or universes. The many-worlds interpretation has been used as a way to solve causality paradoxes arising from time travel. Any quantum event creates another branching timeline, and all possible outcomes coexist without any wave function collapse. This interpretation was an alternative but is opposite from the Copenhagen interpretation, which suggests that wave functions do collapse. In science, hypothetical faster-than-light particles are known as tachyons; the mathematics of Einstein's relativity suggests that they would have an imaginary rest mass. Some interpretations suggest that it might move backward in time. General relativity permits the existence of closed timelike curves, which could allow an observer to travel back in time to the same space. Though for the Gödel metric, such an occurrence requires a globally rotating universe, which has been contradicted by observations of the redshifts of distant galaxies and the cosmic background radiation. However, it has been suggested that a slowly rotating universe model may solve the Hubble tension, so it can not yet be ruled out.

Another solution to the problem of causality-based temporal paradoxes is that such paradoxes cannot arise simply because they have not arisen. As illustrated in numerous works of fiction, free will either ceases to exist in the past or the outcomes of such decisions are predetermined. A famous example is the grandfather paradox, in which a person is supposed to travel back in time to kill their own grandfather. This would not be possible to enact because it is a historical fact that one's grandfather was not killed before his child (one's parent) was conceived. This view does not simply hold that history is an unchangeable constant, but that any change made by a hypothetical future time traveller would already have happened in their past, resulting in the reality that the traveller moves from. The Novikov self-consistency principle asserts that due to causality constraints, time travel to the past is impossible.

== Perception ==
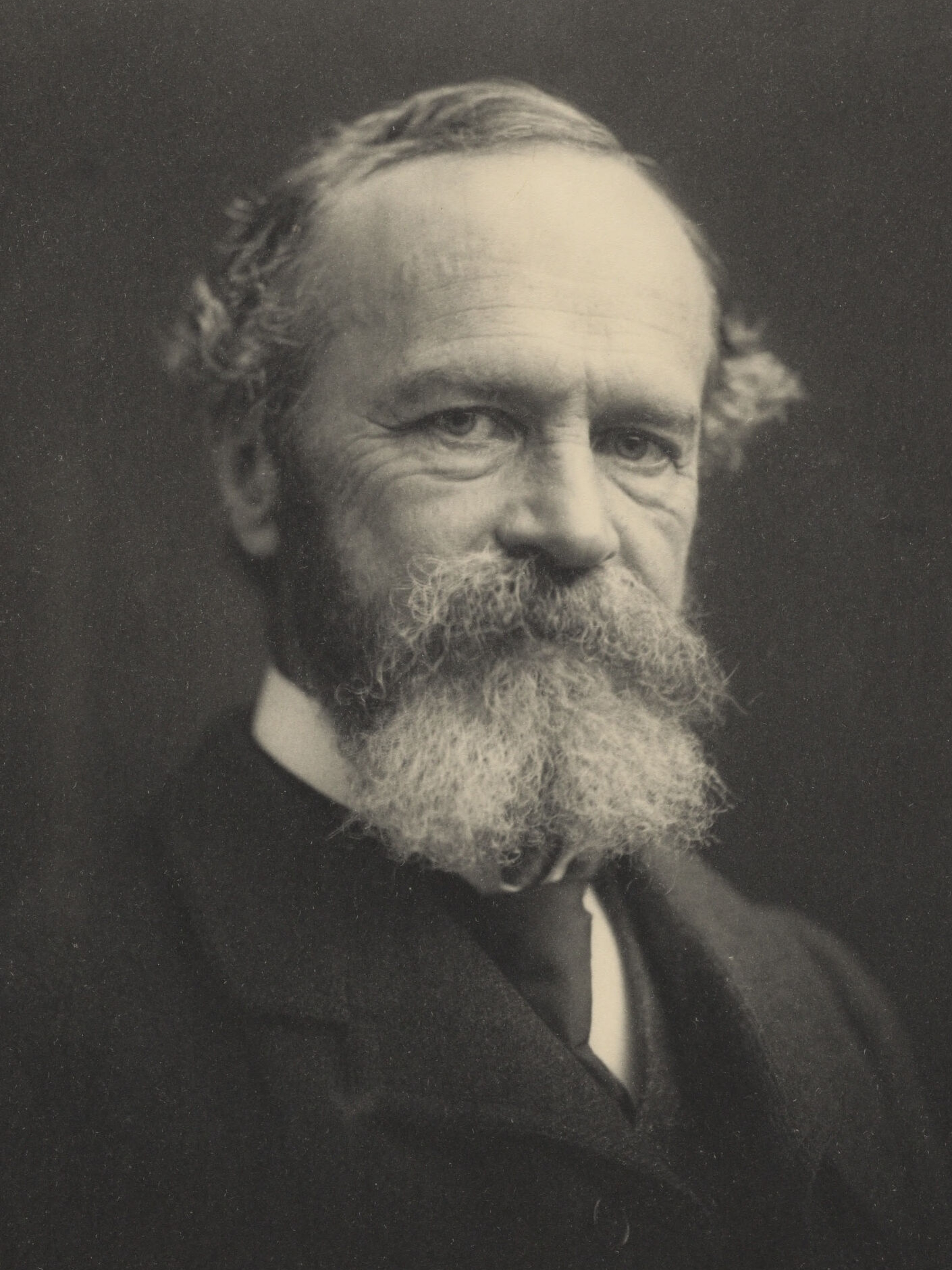
Philosopher and psychologist William James

The specious present refers to the time duration wherein one's perceptions are considered to be in the present. The experienced present is said to be 'specious' in that, unlike the objective present, it is an interval and not a durationless instant. The term specious present was first introduced by the psychologist E. R. Clay, and later developed by William James.

=== Biopsychology ===
The brain's judgment of time is known to be a highly distributed system, including at least the cerebral cortex, cerebellum, and basal ganglia as its components. One particular component, the suprachiasmatic nuclei, is responsible for the circadian (or daily) rhythm, while other cell clusters appear capable of shorter-range (ultradian) timekeeping. Mental chronometry is the use of response time in perceptual-motor tasks to infer the content, duration, and temporal sequencing of cognitive operations. Judgments of time can be altered by temporal illusions (like the kappa effect), age, psychoactive drugs, and hypnosis. The sense of time is impaired in some people with neurological diseases such as Parkinson's disease and attention deficit disorder.

Psychoactive drugs can impair the judgment of time. Stimulants can lead both humans and rats to overestimate time intervals, while depressants can have the opposite effect. The level of activity in the brain of neurotransmitters such as dopamine and norepinephrine may be the reason for this. Such chemicals will either excite or inhibit the firing of neurons in the brain, with a greater firing rate allowing the brain to register the occurrence of more events within a given interval (speed up time) and a decreased firing rate reducing the brain's capacity to distinguish events occurring within a given interval (slow down time).

Psychologists assert that time seems to go faster with age, but the literature on this age-related perception of time remains controversial. Those who support this notion argue that young people, having more excitatory neurotransmitters, are able to cope with faster external events. Some also argued that the perception of time is also influenced by memory and how much one have experienced; for example, as one get older, they will have spent less part of their total life waiting a month. Meanwhile, children's expanding cognitive abilities allow them to understand time in a different way. Two- and three-year-olds' understanding of time is mainly limited to "now and not now". Five- and six-year-olds can grasp the ideas of past, present, and future. Seven- to ten-year-olds can use clocks and calendars. Socioemotional selectivity theory proposed that when people perceive their time as open-ended and nebulous, they focus more on future-oriented goals.

=== Spatial conceptualisation ===
Although time is regarded as an abstract concept, there is increasing evidence that time is conceptualised in the mind in terms of space. That is, instead of thinking about time in a general, abstract way, humans think about time in a spatial way and mentally organize it as such. Using space to think about time allows humans to mentally organize temporal events in a specific way. This spatial representation of time is often represented in the mind as a mental timeline (MTL). These origins are shaped by many environmental factors. Literacy appears to play a large role in the different types of MTLs, as reading/writing direction provides an everyday temporal orientation that differs from culture to culture. In Western cultures, the MTL may unfold rightward (with the past on the left and the future on the right) since people mostly read and write from left to right. Western calendars also continue this trend by placing the past on the left with the future progressing toward the right. Conversely, speakers of Arabic, Farsi, Urdu, and Hebrew read from right to left, and their MTLs unfold leftward (past on the right with future on the left); evidence suggests these speakers organize time events in their minds like this as well.

There is also evidence that some cultures use an allocentric spatialization, often based on environmental features. A study of the indigenous Yupno people of Papua New Guinea found that they may use an allocentric MTL, in which time flows uphill; when speaking of the past, individuals gestured downhill, where the river of the valley flowed into the ocean. When speaking of the future, they gestured uphill, toward the source of the river. This was common regardless of which direction the person faced. A similar study of the Pormpuraawans, an aboriginal group in Australia, reported that when they were asked to organize photos of a man aging "in order," individuals consistently placed the youngest photos to the east and the oldest photos to the west, regardless of which direction they faced. This directly clashed with an American group that consistently organized the photos from left to right. Therefore, this group also appears to have an allocentric MTL, but based on the cardinal directions instead of geographical features. The wide array of distinctions in the way different groups think about time leads to the broader question that different groups may also think about other abstract concepts in different ways as well, such as causality and number.

== Use ==
In sociology and anthropology, time discipline is the general name given to social and economic rules, conventions, customs, and expectations governing the measurement of time, the social currency and awareness of time measurements, and people's expectations concerning the observance of these customs by others. Arlie Russell Hochschild and Norbert Elias have written on the use of time from a sociological perspective.

The use of time is an important issue in understanding human behavior, education, and travel behavior. Time-use research is a developing field of study. The question concerns how time is allocated across a number of activities (such as time spent at home, at work, shopping, etc.). Time use changes with technology, as the television or the Internet created new opportunities to use time in different ways. However, some aspects of time use are relatively stable over long periods of time, such as the amount of time spent traveling to work, which despite major changes in transport, has been observed to be about 20–30 minutes one-way for a large number of cities over a long period.

Time management is the organization of tasks or events by first estimating how much time a task requires and when it must be completed, and adjusting events that would interfere with its completion so it is done in the appropriate amount of time. Calendars and day planners are common examples of time management tools.

== Sequence of events ==
A sequence of events, or series of events, is a sequence of items, facts, events, actions, changes, or procedural steps, arranged in time order (chronological order), often with causality relationships among the items. Because of causality, cause precedes effect, or cause and effect may appear together in a single item, but effect never precedes cause. A sequence of events can be presented in text, tables, charts, or timelines. The description of the items or events may include a timestamp. A sequence of events that includes the time along with place or location information to describe a sequential path may be referred to as a world line.

Uses of a sequence of events include stories, historical events (chronology), directions and steps in procedures, and timetables for scheduling activities. A sequence of events may also be used to help describe processes in science, technology, and medicine. A sequence of events may be focused on past events (e.g., stories, history, chronology), on future events that must be in a predetermined order (e.g., plans, schedules, procedures, timetables), or focused on the observation of past events with the expectation that the events will occur in the future (e.g., processes, projections). The use of a sequence of events occurs in fields as diverse as machines (cam timer), documentaries (Seconds From Disaster), law (choice of law), finance (directional-change intrinsic time), computer simulation (discrete event simulation), and electric power transmission (sequence of events recorder). A specific example of a sequence of events is the timeline of the Fukushima Daiichi nuclear disaster.

== See also ==
- List of UTC timing centers – Primary time standard globally used to regulate clocks and time
- Loschmidt's paradox – Conflict between known physical principles (time symmetry and entropy)
- Time metrology – Application of metrology for timekeeping
- Time zone – Area that observes a uniform standard time

=== Organizations ===
- Antiquarian Horological Society – AHS (United Kingdom)
- Chronometrophilia (Switzerland)
- Deutsche Gesellschaft für Chronometrie – DGC (Germany)
- National Association of Watch and Clock Collectors – NAWCC (United States)

=== Miscellaneous arts and sciences ===
- Date and time representation by country
- List of cycles
- Nonlinear narrative – Narrative technique
- Philosophy of physics – Truths and principles of the study of matter, space, time and energy
- Rate (mathematics) – Ratio between two related quantities in different units

=== Miscellaneous units ===
- Fiscal year – One-year term for government and business financial reporting
- Half-life – Time for exponential decay to remove half of a quantity
- Hexadecimal time – Base 16 time format proposed in 1863
- Tithi – Lunar day in the Hindu calendar
- Unix epoch

Quantity			SI unit	
Name	Symbol	Dimension symbol	Unit name	Unit symbol
time, duration	t	T	second	s
length	l, x, r, etc.	L	metre	m
mass	m	M	kilogram	kg
electric current	I , i	I	ampere	A
thermodynamic temperature	T	Θ	kelvin	K
amount of substance	n	N	mole	mol
luminous intensity	I_{v}	J	candela	cd
