= Henry B. Fried =

American horologist, watchmaker, educator, and author (1907–1996)

- Henry B. Fried in 1991
- Born: January 8, 1907; New York City, U.S.
- Died: March 10, 1996 (aged 89); Larchmont, New York, U.S.
- Occupations: Horologist; watchmaker; educator; author
- Spouse: Tina Fried
- Children: 2

Henry B. Fried (January 8, 1907 – March 10, 1996) was an American horologist, watchmaker, educator, and technical author. Described by The New York Times as "the Dean of American watchmakers", he was the first licensed teacher of watchmaking and clockmaking in the New York City public-school system, wrote 14 books and hundreds of articles on horology, and held leadership positions in several American horological organizations.

== Early life and watchmaking career ==
Fried was born in Williamsburg, Brooklyn, into a family of Polish watchmakers. His father and grandfather practiced the trade. When his father died during a typhus epidemic, the 13-year-old Fried left school and began working with his older brothers in Manhattan's Maiden Lane watchmaking district. He continued to study the technical aspects of horology on his own and, at age 19, became head watchmaker at K.K. Importing Inc.

In 1938, Fried was selected from more than 200 applicants to become the New York City Board of Education's first licensed teacher of watchmaking and clockmaking. He led the horology department at George Westinghouse Vocational and Technical High School during a 34-year teaching career. After World War II, he taught high-school students, veterans, and private-school pupils, and established a rehabilitation program that trained veterans in watch and clock mechanics.

Fried continued to undertake specialist repair work and served as an expert witness in watch-industry litigation. He also lectured and led international tours devoted to horology.

== Writing and collecting ==
Fried began writing regularly for Jewelers' Circular-Keystone in 1942 and remained associated with the publication, later known as JCK, for nearly five decades as a writer, horology editor, and technical consultant. He wrote 14 books, hundreds of magazine articles, and numerous pamphlets, and produced most of his own technical illustrations. His subjects ranged from mechanical escapements to electric and quartz watches. Repairing Quartz Watches (1983) was described by The New York Times as the first book devoted to the repair of quartz watches. He also contributed as a consultant to the Random House Dictionary, Merriam-Webster Dictionary, and JCK Jewelers Dictionary.

Fried assembled a large collection of watches and clocks and an extensive private horological library. He donated his library to the American Watchmakers-Clockmakers Institute (AWCI), whose research library was named for him. The Henry B. Fried Library at AWCI's headquarters holds about 3,500 volumes representing 3,000 horological titles.

== Professional organizations ==
Fried helped establish the National Association of Watch and Clock Collectors (NAWCC). He served as president of the Horological Society of New York, the New York State Watchmakers Association, and the American Watchmakers Institute; as vice-president of the Horological Institute of America; and as technical director of the AWCI. The Horological Society of New York credits him with writing 14 books and with serving as its president.

== Honors and legacy ==
In 1986, Fried became the inaugural recipient of the NAWCC's Henry B. Fried Watch Award, which recognizes excellence in watchmaking. In 1990, he received the Silver Medal of the British Horological Institute for his authorship and his role in establishing horological teaching in New York. He was the first American to receive the medal.

The Henry B. Fried Clock Tower at the American Watchmakers-Clockmakers Institute's headquarters in Harrison, Ohio, was dedicated on June 23, 1995. Funded by Fred and Isabel Beeler, it incorporates a restored 1924 E. Howard Clock Company movement. In 2017, the Horological Society of New York established the Henry B. Fried Scholarship to support students attending full-time watchmaking schools.

== Personal life and death ==
Fried and his wife, Tina, were married for 65 years. They had a son and a daughter; their son predeceased him. Fried died in his sleep at his home in Larchmont, New York, on March 10, 1996.

== Selected bibliography ==
Fried's books include:

- The Watch Repairer's Manual (1949)
- Bench Practices for Watch Repairers (1954)
- The Watch Escapement: How to Analyze, How to Adjust, How to Repair (1959)
- The Electric Watch Repair Manual (1965)
- Cavalcade of Time: A Visual History of Watches (1968)
- Bench Practices for Watch & Clockmakers (1974)
- Repairing Quartz Watches (1983)
- The Museum of the American Watchmakers Institute (1993)
