= RingID =

Social networking platform

ringID
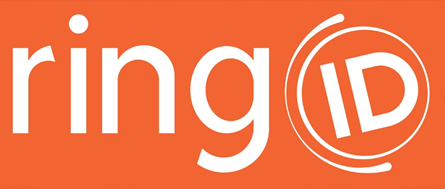
- Developer: Ring Inc.
- Initial release: July 2015
Stable release
- iOS: 5.2.8 / January 30, 2020; 5 years ago
- Android: 5.4.7 / October 26, 2019; 6 years ago
- Windows Phone: 4.4.0.0
- Windows NT: 4.8.3.0
- Operating system: Android, iOS, Windows Phone, Windows NT
- Available in: English, Bangla
- Type: Instant messaging, social networking, VoIP
- License: Freeware
- Website: ringid.com

ringID is a controversial social networking platform designed and developed by Ring Inc. located in Montreal, Quebec, Canada. ringID allows users to communicate for free using their individual ID globally over the internet. It was initially released in July 2015.

It has been called a Ponzi scheme and criticized for not allowing users to cash out. In September 2021, an embezzlement case was filed in Bangladesh against 25 people, including two founders of the company. One founder was arrested for embezzling funds.

== History ==
ringID was initially released in July 2015 by Ring Inc., with video calling features added in 2016. More features were added with the goal of providing a single platform to cater to all social networking needs.

== Features ==
ringID was conceptualized as an all-in-one social networking platform. The platform can be used for live broadcasting, voice and video calls, messaging, and content sharing.

Users can delete messages from both their device and the receiver's. They can also send instant messages to recipients which are deleted automatically once the predefined time is over.

== Criticism and complaints ==
The Business Standard has accused RingID of being a Ponzi scheme because it pays users for bringing in more users and for watching advertisements. In September 2021, The Business Standard reported that users were not able to cash out, which it characterized as embezzlement. In total 21.2 million taka were allegedly embezzled. A case was filed against 25 people, including RingID owners, under the Digital Security Act and the Multi-Level Marketing Control Act.

Two company founders were arrested in December 2016 in connection with an unpaid fees case filed by the Bangladesh Telecommunication Regulatory Commission. The two moved to Canada while out on bail.

In October 2021, one founder was remanded in jail by a Dhaka Metropolitan Magistrate, after his arrest on charges of misappropriating Tk200 crore in three months by luring people to ringID's investment scheme and promising online income.
