= American Watchmakers-Clockmakers Institute =

Not-for-profit trade association

- Abbreviation: AWCI
- Formation: 1960
- Location: Harrison, Ohio, United States
- President: David Lindow
- Website: www.awci.com

The American Watchmakers-Clockmakers Institute (AWCI) is a not-for-profit trade association based in the United States that is dedicated to the advancement of the modern watch industry, from which it receives a significant portion of its funding. While the AWCI is an American organization, it also has members throughout the world.

AWCI promotes the modern watch industry by providing a range of education, certification, technical assistance and business services. For over 50 years, AWCI has worked with horology schools, individual watchmakers and clockmakers, manufacturers and retailers to advance the art, science and business of horology. The AWCI hosts the largest online repair directory connecting consumers with local repair professionals who are AWCI members, however this does not include all local repair professionals. Horological Times, the official publication of AWCI, is currently the only monthly horological magazine serving the U.S. market (2011). The Institute is supported by numerous local affiliate chapters around the nation. AWCI also offers books and media on timekeeping topics to members and the general public. Continuing education and certification in certain areas of watchmaking and clock making are offered by AWCI. Several current (as of 2011) watch-related courses provided include: Basic Quartz Watch Repair, Modern Automatic Watches, Balance Staffing and Timing, Polishing and Waterproof Testing, Modern Mechanical Chronograph and more. These courses are conducted at the AWCI Marvin E. Whitney Academy of Watchmaking in Harrison, Ohio. Clockmaker courses can be scheduled by request.

AWCI was organized in 1960 as the American Watchmakers Institute (AWI). This was the nation's first unified horological organization. It combined the members of the United Horological Association of America (UHAA) with those of the Horological Institute of America (HIA) to form AWI. However, with the continual influx of clock-related interest into the organization, a name change was recommended by the Affiliate Chapters in 1992 and was formally changed to the American Watchmakers-Clockmakers Institute. Affiliate chapters include the Horological Society of New York and the Watchmakers Association of Pennsylvania.

The American Watchmaker-Clockmakers Institute maintains the ELM CharitableTrust, a 501 (c) (3) trust. The ELM (Education, Library and Museum) Trust operates The Henry B. Fried Resource Library and The Orville R. Hagans History of Time Museum, which are located at AWCI headquarters in Harrison, Ohio. The ELM Trust also administers annual scholarships to horology students in the U.S. through The Harold J. and Marie Borneman Greenwood Memorial Fund of the New Hampshire Charitable Foundation.

== See also ==
- British Horological Institute
- chronometer
- clock
- clockmaker
- horology
- watch
- watchmaker
