= Chronometrophilia =

Chronometrophilia is described in its byline as the "Swiss Association for the History of Timekeeping / Association suisse pour l'histoire de la mesure du temps / Schweizerische Gesellschaft für die Geschichte der Zeitmessung". It is a group of collectors and enthusiasts interested in the history of horology.

Given that Switzerland is quadrilingual, they needed a language-neutral name for their organisation. They invented the term chronometrophilia from the Greek chronos (time) and philia ("the love of"); and meter, a Teutonic word cognate to the Latin modius (bushel).

The association was founded in 1976 and unites collectors, scholars and museum professionals interested in the historical aspects of clocks and watches. Meetings are held about 4 times a year in various locations in Switzerland and are usually conducted bilingually in French and German. Most meetings involve visits to museums, restoration workshops or private collections. Once a year the organization also organises an international study tour, travelling to a foreign locale to study historic horological artefacts.

"Chronometrophilia" is also the name of their semi-annual glossy, scholarly journal (published with articles in both French and German).

The administrative office of Chronometrophilia is located in La Chaux-de-Fonds, a Swiss town in the Jura Mountains that is considered the focus of the Swiss watchmaking industry and which also houses the Musée International d'Horlogerie.

Its main sister organizations in other countries pursuing similar goals are:

- Antiquarian Horological Society - AHS (United Kingdom)
- Association Française des Amateurs d'Horlogerie Ancienne - AFAHA (France)
- Deutsche Gesellschaft für Chronometrie - DGC (Germany)
- HORA Associazione Italiana Cultori di Orologeria Antica (Italy)
- National Association of Watch and Clock Collectors - NAWCC (United States of America)
