= Horological Society of New York =

American nonprofit organization

Pocket-watch display at Horological Society Museum, New York City

The Horological Society of New York (HSNY) is an American nonprofit organization dedicated to advancing the art and science of horology.

== History ==
The Horological Society of New York was founded on March 26, 1866, and is one of the oldest horological societies in the world. A group of German immigrants including George Schmidt and Frederick Ruoff founded the group as the Deutscher Uhrmacher Verein, or German Watchmakers Society, with all meetings and business conducted in that language. As a guild for working watchmakers, it offered life insurance and training to members.

The Society switched to using English around the time of World War I to accommodate a more diverse membership, and was renamed the Horological Society of New York in 1930. After a high point in membership following World War II, the Society declined during the quartz crisis in the 1970s and 1980s.

In recent years, as mechanical watches have once again increased in popularity, the Society has expanded and now includes members from all over the world. It became a 501(c)(3) organization and serves watch collectors, hobbyists, and researchers interested in horology, as well as watchmakers and watchmaking students. It is an affiliate chapter of the American Watchmakers-Clockmakers Institute (AWCI).

The Society moved to its premises on “Club Row” in midtown Manhattan in 2018, where other private clubs include the Harvard Club of New York City and the New York Yacht Club. It is located in the General Society of Mechanics and Tradesmen Building, a New York City Landmark.

== Current activities ==
In the 1930s, the Society began publishing a newsletter, The Horologist's Loupe, which is still distributed digitally as of November 2025. The Society holds monthly lectures on various topics related to watchmaking and horology.

The Society offers watchmaking classes in a classroom at the General Society of Mechanics and Tradesmen Building on West 44th Street. Working watchmakers teach classes to the public on evenings and weekends. Every year, HSNY offers financial aid to watchmaking students and institutions in the U.S. By funding living and other expenses for watchmaking students, HSNY aims to address the current shortage of watchmakers in the country. HSNY hosts an annual gala and a separate charity auction to raise money for its scholarship program.

In October 2022, HSNY opened the Jost Bürgi Research Library, containing over 25,000 items related to time and timekeeping. While HSNY has possessed a small collection of books since its origin, the vast majority of the material in the present collection was donated by collector Fortunat Mueller-Maerki, a former chairman of the National Clock and Watch Library. The HSNY library includes periodicals, ephemera and rare books dating back to 1652. It is named after Jost Bürgi, a Swiss clockmaker, astronomer and mathematician. It is open to the public and also hosts rotating exhibits.
