= Instant =

Shortest interval in time

In physics and the philosophy of science, instant is an infinitesimal interval in time, whose passage is instantaneous. In ordinary speech, an instant has been defined as "a point or very short space of time," a notion deriving from its etymological source, the Latin verb instare, from in- + stare ('to stand'), meaning 'to stand upon or near.'

The continuous nature of time and its infinite divisibility was addressed by Aristotle in his Physics, where he wrote on Zeno's paradoxes. The philosopher and mathematician Bertrand Russell was still seeking to define the exact nature of an instant thousands of years later.

As of October 2020, the smallest time interval certified in regulated measurements is on the order of 397 zeptoseconds (397 × 10^{−21} seconds).

== In correspondence ==
In correspondence, particularly before the twentieth century, instant (usually abbreviated to inst.) can be used to indicate "of the current month". The 11th means the 11th year of the current month. Its use is consistent with the Latin proximo (prox.) for the following month, and ultimo (ult.) for the month just past.

== See also ==
- Chronon
- Infinitesimal
- Planck time
- Present
