= Deutsche Gesellschaft für Chronometrie =

German horology society

Deutsche Gesellschaft für Chronometrie (DGC), (German Society for Timekeeping) today is an organization of scholars, collectors and enthusiasts in Germany interested in the science, art and history of horology.

== History ==
The association was founded in the post World War II years (as an unofficial successor to the Deutsche Gesellschaft fuer Zeitmesskunde) and originally consisted mainly of scientists and engineers from the watch and clock producing industry. Over the years more people joined who were interested in the history of timekeeping devices, and eventually two separate divisions were set up, a Technisch Wissenschaftlicher Fackreis (Scientific Division) and a Historischer Fachkreis "Freunde Alter Uhren" (Historical Division). When the clock and watch industry withered in the fourth quarter of the 20th century the technical division withered, and by 2000 the divisional structure was dropped. Today the bulk of the membership unites collectors, scholars and museum professionals interested in the historical aspects of clocks, sundials and watches.

== Structure ==
Today the association is national in scope, and is loosely organised into working groups, both local groups (in Berlin, Dresden, Franconia, Frankfurt, Furtwangen, Hamburg, Cologne, Mannheim, Munich and Stuttgart) and special interest groups (wristwatches, electrical horology, restoration, sundials, pocket watches, tower clocks, and horological science).

== Activities ==
Besides the meetings of the working groups there is a multiday annual meeting often including visits to museums, restoration workshops or private collections. Once a year the organization also organizes an international study tour, traveling to a foreign locals to study historic horological artefacts. The organization also maintains a comprehensive library with books, periodicals, auction catalogues and trade manuals related to horology.

== Publications ==
The DGC published a "Jahrbuch", an annual volume of scholarly papers.

- Starting in 1961 the Freunde Alter Uhren started publishing its own yearbook with articles on historic timekeepers and collecting horological artefacts and sundials.
- Starting in 2000 the two yearbooks were combined into a redesigned "Jahresschrift".
- Newsletter: The organization publishes a quarterly newsletter for its members describing the activities of DGC and its working groups.
- Facsimile Editions on CD-ROM: In an effort to preserve and distribute rare historic horological publications the society has an active program of scanning historic periodicals and other publications on horology and making them available to the public and its members on CD-ROM.

The administrative office and the library of the DGC are located in the historic former Gewerbemuseum in Nuremberg, today a continued education center which also houses the Gebhardt collection on the history of the portable timekeeper.

== Sister organisations ==
Its main sister organizations in other countries pursuing similar goals are:

- Antiquarian Horological Society - AHS (United Kingdom)
- Association Française des Amateurs d'Horlogerie Ancienne - AFAHA (France)
- Chronometrophilia (Switzerland)
- HORA Associazione Italiana Cultori di Orologeria Antica (Italy)
- National Association of Watch and Clock Collectors - NAWCC (United States of America)

== Bibliography ==
- Poulle, Emmanuel; Deutsche Gesellschaft für Chronometrie, eds. (2008). Die Planetenlaufuhr: ein Meisterwerk der Astronomie und Technik der Renaissance geschaffen von Eberhard Baldewein 1563-1568. Jahresschrift. Stuttgart: Deutsche Gesellschaft für Chronometrie. ISBN 978-3-89870-548-6. OCLC 631915483.
