= Mental timeline =

A mental timeline is a mental representation of time that is spatial in nature. The mental timeline is similar to the mental number line where numbers are perceived increasing left to right.

Earlier time periods (the past) are associated with the left side of space and later time periods (the future) with the right. It is typically thought of as being presented left to right for populations who read left to right (e.g. English) and right to left for populations who read right to left (e.g. Arabic).

== Rationale ==
One rationale behind the connection between time and space is that space is an easier concept to understand than time. Space is three dimensional and can be perceived directly using visual sensors, that is, we can physically see a space. In contrast time is one dimensional and can only be perceived indirectly, for example, by seeing that a person has aged, we can infer that time has passed however we do not physically see time. There are many other examples of spatial representations of time around the world such as clocks, calendars and hourglasses.

This reasoning is also given for the use of spatial metaphors connecting the intangible concept of time with a more solid concept of space. Spatial metaphors such as, ‘there’s a big day ahead’ or ‘put the past behind you’ are common colloquialisms that represent the idea of a mental timeline. They provide linguistic evidence that our cognitive perception of time is linked to our representation of space.

== Evidence ==
=== Linguistic evidence ===
Evidence the mental timeline can be seen in experiments such as Santiago, Lupianez, Perez and Funes. The participant was shown a list of words categorized into the past or the future on either the left or the right of a computer screen. They were asked to respond by pushing a button either on the left or the right of the keyboard. In the first half of the experiment the left button meant past and right meant future, in the second half these were switched to mean the opposite. The study found that participants responded faster if the response key was aligned with the mental timeline. That is, the participant was faster to respond when the left key was aligned with the past and the right key with the future. This effect mimics the spatial-numerical association of response codes (SNARC) that is shown when testing for the mental number line.

=== Non-linguistic evidence ===
Evidence for this effect has also been shown using non-linguistic stimuli. Fuhrman and Boroditsky ran a similar experiment to the one described above but with pictorial cues rather than linguistic. Participants were shown pictures of a banana at three time points, unopened or ‘earlier’, half-peeled or ‘middle’ and empty banana peel or ‘later’. Again, participants were asked to respond by pushing a button either on the left or the right of the keyboard. The results showed the same effect as before, where response times were faster when the key was aligned with the direction of the mental timeline.

=== Evidence in the visually impaired ===
The effect of the mental timeline does not appear to be reliant on visual experience. An experiment using braille showed that blind participants had the same left to right mental timeline as sighted participants. It is thought to be due to the fact that both the sighted and blind participants, in this case, read left to right.

== The effect of visual neglect ==
There is evidence that patients with left hemispatial neglect ignore the left side of the mental timeline. Saj, Fuhrmann, Boroditsky conducted an experiment where patients with left spatial neglect were measured against controls in remembering pictorial cues. The cues were pictures of food that a fictional character ‘David’ liked to eat. Foods David liked to eat in the past were shown with a white cap above them, while foods he will like to eat in the future were shown with a black top hat above them. The results showed that the participants with neglect recalled fewer items coded to the past and mislabelled more past items as future items than the control group. This suggests that the left side of time (the past) was neglected much like the patients have visual neglect of the left side giving more evidence to the use of the mental timeline.

== Cited texts ==
- Casasanto, Daniel; Boroditsky, Lera (February 2008). "Time in the mind: Using space to think about time". Cognition. 106 (2): 579–593. doi:10.1016/j.cognition.2007.03.004. hdl:11858/00-001M-0000-0013-40E2-4. ISSN 0010-0277. PMID 17509553. S2CID 15895069.
- Aguirre, Roberto; Santiago, Julio (2017). "Do potential past and future events activate the Left- Right Mental Timeline?". Psicológica. 38 (2): 231–255. ISSN 0211-2159.
- Bonato, Mario; Zorzi, Marco; Umiltà, Carlo (November 2012). "When time is space: Evidence for a mental time line". Neuroscience & Biobehavioral Reviews. 36 (10): 2257–2273. CiteSeerX 10.1.1.703.7921. doi:10.1016/j.neubiorev.2012.08.007. PMID 22935777. S2CID 207089846.
- Eikmeier, Verena; Alex-Ruf, Simone; Maienborn, Claudia; Schröter, Hannes; Ulrich, Rolf (13 June 2016). The Mental Timeline During the Processing of Linguistic Information. Human Cognitive Processing. Vol. 52. John Benjamins Publishing Company. pp. 103–122. doi:10.1075/hcp.52.06eik. ISBN 978-90-272-4668-4.
- Fischer, Martin H; Castel, Alan D; Dodd, Michael D; Pratt, Jay (18 May 2003). "Perceiving numbers causes spatial shifts of attention". Nature Neuroscience. 6 (6): 555–556. doi:10.1038/nn1066. PMID 12754517. S2CID 36424716.
- de la Vega, Irmgard; Eikmeier, Verena; Ulrich, Rolf; Kaup, Barbara (November 2016). "The Mental Timeline in a Crossed-Hands Paradigm". Experimental Psychology. 63 (6): 326–332. doi:10.1027/1618-3169/a000342. PMID 28059026.
