= Glossary of mereology =

This is a glossary of mereology. Mereology is the philosophical study of part-whole relationships, also called parthood relationships.

== A ==
anti-symmetry of parthood
In mereology, a principle stating that if A is part of B and B is part of A, then A and B are identical, reinforcing the notion of precise part-whole relationships.
atomic mereology
A branch of mereology that deals with wholes that are ultimately composed of indivisible parts, or atoms, focusing on how such atomic parts combine to form larger wholes.
atomless gunk
See gunk.

== C ==
calculus of individuals
Because mereology applies to individuals, it is called the calculus of individuals, in contrast to set theory, which is called the calculus of classes.
classical mereology
Classical mereology is the mereological theory obtained by assuming that the parthood relation is a partial ordering, and that the unrestricted fusion principle holds.
composition
The relation that connects many things to a single thing that includes whatever is in the many things, and nothing extraneous to them.
compositional universalism
A position in mereology that holds any collection of entities, regardless of how disparate, can constitute a whole, leading to the possibility of any entities forming a composite object. Also called "mereological universalism".

== E ==
extensional mereology
A branch of mereology that focuses on the relations of parts to wholes based on the extensions of the parts, without regard to the nature or properties of the parts.
extensionality
The principle in mereology stating that two objects are identical if they have the same proper parts.

== F ==
fusion
Synonym for "mereological sum".

== G ==
general extensional mereology
General extensional mereology is the mereological theory obtained by assuming that the parthood relation is a partial ordering and that the strong supplementation principle, and the unrestricted fusion principle, hold.
ground mereology
Ground mereology is the mereological theory obtained by assuming that the parthood relation is a partial ordering.
gunk
An object or substance whose parts all have proper parts, which means the object is divisible into parts indefinitely, with no simplest parts or atoms. (Short for "atomless gunk".)
gunky
Adjective describing entities, or worlds, made out of atomless gunk – that is, objects all of whose parts have proper parts.

== H ==
harmony
The principle that an object x is part of an object y if, and only if, the region in space occupied by x is part of the region in space occupied by y.
hunky
Adjective describing a possible world that is both gunky and junky.

== I ==
identity of indiscernibles
A principle often discussed in the context of mereology, stating that no two distinct objects have exactly the same properties, thus differentiating even similar wholes by their specific parts.

== J ==
junk
A state of affairs where all objects are proper parts of something else, which means objects are composable into further objects indefinitely, never forming a complete "world". (Short for "worldless junk"; coined as the converse of "atomless gunk".)
junky
Adjective describing a possible world with junk in it, i.e., a world where every object is a proper part of something else.

== K ==
knug
Term coined by John Parsons for what is more commonly called "junk"; coined to be "gunk" written backwards.
knunk
A proposed term for structures that are junky and all their members are gunky; coinage by Giberman, inspired by Parsons's "knug", to reflect what must have been meant by the coiners of "hunky", since, if worlds are taken to be concrete objects, no gunky-and-junky worlds are possible.

== M ==
mereological continuity
The principle in mereology that suggests wholes are continuously divisible into smaller and smaller parts, with no abrupt discontinuities in the structure of the objects.
mereological essentialism
The view in mereology that parts are essential to the wholes they constitute; that is, a whole cannot exist without having precisely those parts.
mereological extensionality
The principle in mereology stating that two objects are identical if they have the same proper parts.
mereological fusion
Synonym for "mereological sum".
mereological harmony
See harmony.
mereological monism
The view that, in a large and significant domain of things, classical extensional mereology is the only correct theory of parthood and composition. Not to be confused with monism.
mereological nihilism
The philosophical position that denies the existence of composite objects, asserting that only basic, partless entities exist.
mereological sum
An object that is composed of all and only the entities in a given collection, according to the principles of mereology.
mereological universalism
The view that two objects always compose a third, which is to say, that mereological composition is unrestricted. Also called "compositional universalism".
mereology
The study of the relationships between parts and wholes, and the principles governing the composition of objects.
minimal mereology
Minimal mereology is the mereological theory obtained by assuming that the parthood relation is a partial ordering, and that the weak supplementation principle holds.
monism
The view that there is only one fundamental object, which is the cosmos, and that all other objects (its parts) derive their reality from it. Formally, $(\exists ! x) Bx ~ \& ~ Bu$, where $u$ represents the cosmos, and $B$ represents the status of being a basic actual concrete object, i.e., an object that is concrete and does not depend on anything concrete. Not to be confused with senses of "monism" outside of mereology, or with mereological monism.

== N ==
non-well-founded mereology
An approach to mereology where parts and wholes can form circular or self-referential structures, challenging traditional, well-founded notions of parthood.

== O ==
overlap
In mereology, the relation between objects or sets that share at least one part in common.

== P ==
parthood
The relation between an entity and a composite object of which it is a part, central to mereology, the study of parts and wholes.
proper parthood
A relation between two entities where one is a part of the other but not equivalent to it, indicating a strict subset relationship in the context of mereology.
pluralism
The view there are more than one fundamental object; opposed to monism. Not to be confused with senses of "pluralism" outside of mereology.
priority pluralism
Another term for pluralism, emphasizing that pluralities are metaphysically prior to wholes, although wholes exist.

== R ==
reflexivity of parthood
The property according to which everything is part of itself.

== S ==
simple
In mereology, a simple is an object that has no parts other than itself, often considered in discussions of mereological nihilism and the debate over the existence of composite objects.
strong supplementation principle
A principle in mereology stating that if an object is not part of another, then there must be a part of the latter that does not overlap with the object, emphasizing the distinctness and separability of parts within wholes.

== T ==
transitivity of parthood
The property where if A is part of B, and B is part of C, then A is part of C, emphasizing the chain-like nature of part-whole relationships.

== U ==
underlap
A concept in mereology where two objects do not share any parts in common, opposite of overlap, emphasizing the disjointness of the objects.
unrestricted fusion
A principle in mereology allowing for the existence of a composite object consisting of any collection of parts, regardless of how dispersed or unrelated those parts may be.

== W ==
worldless junk
See junk.

== See also ==
- Glossary of set theory
- Mereology
