= Katherine Hawley =

British philosopher

Katherine Jane Hawley FRSE FBA (1971–2021) was a British philosopher specialising in metaphysics, epistemology, ethics, and philosophy of physics. Hawley was a professor of philosophy at the University of St Andrews. She was the author of How Things Persist (OUP 2002), Trust: a Very Short Introduction (OUP 2012), and How To Be Trustworthy (OUP 2020). Hawley was elected a Fellow of Royal Society of Edinburgh in 2016, elected a Fellow of the British Academy in 2020, and she was the recipient of a Philip Leverhulme Prize (2003) and a Leverhulme Major Research Fellowship (2014–16).

== Life and career ==
Hawley was born in Stoke-on-Trent, England. She did her undergraduate degree (BA) in physics and philosophy at Balliol College, Oxford (1989–92) and lived in France for a short while afterwards. She then went on to receive her MPhil (1993–94) and PhD (1994–97) in the Department of History and Philosophy of Science at the University of Cambridge, under the supervision of Peter Lipton. Prior to becoming a Lecturer at the University of St Andrews in 1999, Hawley had been Henry Sidgwick Research Fellow of Newnham College, Cambridge, where she had taught a variety of subjects, inter alia, political philosophy, critical thinking, epistemology, formal logic, and metaphysics. She most recently lived in Anstruther in Fife with her husband Jon Hesk, Reader in the Classics Department of St. Andrews University, with whom she had two children. She served as an editorial chair of The Philosophical Quarterly (2005–10), in addition to being a deputy (1999–2001) and an associate editor (2011–2012) of the British Journal for the Philosophy of Science.

She died at home with her family supporting her in April 2021.

== Work ==
In How Things Persist (2002), Hawley defends a 'stage-theory' of persistence that combines the four-dimensionalism of perdurance theory with an endurantist account of predication. Heather Dyke (in Notre Dame Philosophical Reviews) praised the book for offering a new formulation of endurance theory as “the claim that ordinary objects are such that (i) they exist at more than one time and (ii) statements about what parts they have must be made relative to some time or other” (Hawley, p. 30, cited in Dyke, 2013). According to Dyke, this characterisation captures the fundamental notion that ordinary objects exist at more than one time without being temporally extended in addition to simplifying cross-comparisons with the perdurance theory, which accepts (i) but rejects (ii).

Recently, Hawley's research interests shifted from persistence, parthood and identity to (un)trustworthiness and competence in ethics and epistemology. She cited the metametaphysical turn in analytic philosophy coupled with her deflationary intuitions about the possibility of methodology of metaphysics as a reason for moving away from metaphysics to ethics and epistemology. In How To Be Trustworthy (2020), Hawley explored what it is to be trustworthy or untrustworthy, articulating a notion of 'trustworthiness' as avoiding unfulfilled commitments.

== Selected works ==
=== Authored books ===
- How To Be Trustworthy, Oxford University Press (2020) (176 pp.)
- Trust: A Very Short Introduction, Oxford University Press (2012) (121 pp.)
- How Things Persist, Oxford University Press (2001) (xi + 221 pp.)

=== Co-edited books ===
- The Admissible Contents of Perception, edited with Fiona Macpherson, Oxford: Wiley-Blackwell (2011). Re-issue of Philosophical Quarterly special issue 59.236, with a new introduction sole-authored by FM.
- Philosophy of Science Today, edited with Peter Clark, Oxford: Oxford University Press (2003). Re-issue of British Journal of Philosophy of Science special anniversary issue.

== Professional offices and service ==
- Head of School of Philosophical, Anthropological and Film Studies, University of St Andrews 2009–2014.
- Former committee member of the British Society for the Philosophy of Science, the Analysis committee, and the British Philosophical Association; committee member for the Mind Association (2013-current).

== Grants and prizes ==
- Leverhulme Major Research Fellowship, 2014–16 (£94,445).
- Local Principal Investigator for Marie Curie Initial Training Network, 2009–13 (value to St Andrews approx. £153,000).
- AHRB Research Leave award, 2004 (£13,153).
- Philip Leverhulme Prize, 2003 (Research prize of £50,000)
- British Academy Joint Activities grant, 2003–5 (£4,500 to fund collaboration with philosophers at Western Washington University).
