= Temporal parts =

Metaphysical concept of an object's "presence" in different times

In contemporary metaphysics, temporal parts are the parts of an object that exist in time. A temporal part would be something like "the first year of a person's life", or "all of a table from between 10:00 a.m. on June 21, 1994 to 11:00 p.m. on July 23, 1996". The term is used in the debate over the persistence of material objects. Objects typically have parts that exist in space—a human body, for example, has spatial parts like hands, feet, and legs. Some metaphysicians believe objects have temporal parts as well.

Originally it was argued that those who believe in temporal parts believe in perdurantism, that persisting objects are wholes composed entirely of temporal parts. This view was contrasted with endurantism, the claim that objects are wholly present at any one time (thus not having different temporal parts at different times). This claim is still commonplace, but philosophers like Ted Sider believe that even endurantists should accept temporal parts.

== Definition ==
Not everyone was happy with the definition by analogy: some philosophers, such as Peter van Inwagen, argued that—even given the definition by analogy—they still had no real idea what a temporal part was meant to be, whilst others have felt that whether temporal parts existed or not is merely a verbal dispute (Eli Hirsch holds this view).

Gallois surveys some of the attempts to create a more specific definition. The early attempts included identifying temporal parts with ordered pairs of times and objects, but it seems relatively unproblematic that temporal parts exist given the definition and ordered pairs seem unsuitable to play the role that perdurantists demand, such as being parts of persisting wholes—how can a set be a part of a material object? Later perdurantists identified persisting objects with events, and as events having temporal parts was not problematic (for example, the first and second halves of a football match), it was imagined that persisting objects could have temporal parts. There was a reluctance from many to identify objects with events, and this definition has long since fallen out of fashion.

Of the definitions closest to those commonly used in the literature, the earliest was Thomson:

x is a cross-sectional temporal part of y =df (∃T)[y and x exist through T & no part of x exists outside T & (∀t)(t is in T ⊃ (∀P)(y exactly occupies P at t ⊃ x exactly occupies P at t))].

Later, Sider tried to combat the fears of endurantists who could not understand what a temporal part is by defining it in terms of "part at a time" or "parthood at a time", a relation that the endurantist should accept, unlike parthood simpliciter—which an endurantist may say makes no sense, given that all parts are had at a time. (However, McDaniel argues that even endurantists should accept that notion). Sider gave the following definition, which is widely used:

x is an instantaneous temporal part of y at instant t =df (i) x is a part of y; (ii) x exists at, but only, at t; and (iii) x overlaps every part of y that exists at t.

Sider also gave an alternative definition that is compatible with presentism, using the tensed operators "WILL" and "WAS":

x is an instantaneous temporal part of y =df (i) x is a part of y; (ii) x overlaps every part of y; (iii) it is not the case that WILL (x exists); (iv) it is not the case that WAS (x exists).

While Sider's definition is most commonly used, Zimmerman—troubled by the demand for instants (which may not exist in a gunky space-time that is such that every region has a sub-region)—gives the following:

x is a temporal part of y throughout T =df (i) x exists during and only during T; (ii) for every subinterval T* of T, there is a z such that (a) z is a part of x, and (b) for all u, u has a part in common with z during T* if and only if u has a part in common with y during T*; and (iii) y exists at times outside of T.

== The argument from temporary intrinsics ==
Temporal parts are sometimes used to account for change. The problem of change is just that if an object x and an object y have different properties, then by Leibniz's Law, one ought to conclude that they are different. For example, if a person changes from having long hair to short hair, then the temporal-parts theorist can say that change is the difference between the temporal parts of a temporally extended object (the person). So, the person changes by having a temporal part with long hair, and a temporal part with short hair; the temporal parts are different, which is consistent with Leibniz's Law.

However, those who reject the notion that ordinary objects, like people, have temporal parts usually adopt a more common-sense view. They say that an object has properties at times. In this view, the person changes by having long hair at t, to short hair at t'. To them, there is no contradiction in thinking an object is capable of having different properties at different times.

An argument widely held to favor the concept of temporal parts arises from these points: David Lewis' argument from temporary intrinsics, which he first advanced in On the Plurality of Worlds. The outline of the argument is as follows:

P1: There are intrinsic properties, i.e., properties had by an object independently of anything in the world.

P2: If every property had by an object is had to times, then there are no intrinsic properties.

C1: Therefore, not every property had by an object is had two times. Objects have some of their properties intrinsically, i.e., simpliciter.

P3: But only temporal parts can have their properties simpliciter.

C2: Therefore, there are temporal parts. (For this to follow, it is required that there be objects).

Premise P1 is an intuitive premise; generally we distinguish between properties and relations. An intrinsic property is just a property that something has independently of anything else; an extrinsic property is had only in relation to something. An example of an extrinsic property is "fatherhood": something is a father only if that something is a male and has a child. An example of an alleged intrinsic property is "shape".

According to Lewis, if we know what "shapes" are, we know them to be properties, not relations. However, if properties are had to times, as endurantists say, then no property is intrinsic. Even if a ball is round throughout its existence, the endurantist must say "for all times in which the ball exists, the ball is round, i.e., it is round at those times; it has the property 'being round at a time'." So, if all properties are had to times, then there are no intrinsic properties, (premise P2).

However, if we think that Lewis is right and some properties are intrinsic, then some properties are not had to times—they are had simpliciter (premise C1).

It might be said that premise P3 is more controversial. For instance, suppose a timeless world is possible. If that were so, then in that world, even if there were intrinsic properties, they would not be had by temporal parts—since by definition a timeless world has no temporal dimension, and therefore in such a world there cannot be temporal parts. However, our world is not timeless, and the possibility of timeless worlds is questionable, so it seems reasonable to think that in worlds with a temporal dimension, only temporal parts can have properties simpliciter.

This is so because temporal parts exist only at an instant, and therefore it makes no sense to speak of them as having properties at a time. Temporal parts have properties, and have a temporal location. So if person A changes from having long hair to having short hair, then that can be paraphrased by saying that there is a temporal part of A that has long hair simpliciter and another that has short hair simpliciter, and the latter is after the former in the temporal sequence; that supports premise P3.

Premise C2 follows, so long as one is not considering empty worlds—if such worlds are even possible. An empty world doesn't have objects that change by having a temporal part with a certain property and another temporal part with a certain other property.

Premise P1, the key premise of the argument, can be coherently denied even if the resulting view—the abandonment of intrinsic properties—is counterintuitive. There are, however, ways to support the argument if one accepts relationalism about space-time.

== See also ==
- Four-dimensionalism
- Mereological nihilism
- Mereology
