= Counterpart theory =

Concept in metaphysics and philosophy

In philosophy, specifically in the area of metaphysics, counterpart theory (CT) is an alternative to standard (Kripkean) possible-worlds semantics for interpreting quantified modal logic. Counterpart theory still presupposes possible worlds, but differs in certain important respects from the Kripkean view. The form of the theory most commonly cited was developed by David Lewis, first in a paper and later in his book On the Plurality of Worlds.

== Differences from the Kripkean view ==
Counterpart theory (CT), as formulated by Lewis, requires that individuals exist in only one world. According to the standard account of possible worlds, a modal statement about an individual (e.g., "it is possible that x is y") says that there is a possible world, W, where the individual x has the property y; in this case there is only one individual, x, at issue. By contrast, according to counterpart theory, this statement says that there is a possible world, W, wherein exists an individual that is not x itself, but rather a distinct individual 'x' different from but nonetheless similar to x. So, when I state that I might have been a banker (rather than a philosopher), according to counterpart theory I am saying not that I exist in another possible world where I am a banker, but rather that my counterpart does. Nevertheless, this statement about my counterpart is still held to ground the truth of the statement that I might have been a banker. The requirement that any individual exist in only one world is to avoid what Lewis termed the "problem of accidental intrinsics", which he thought would require a single individual to both have and simultaneously not have particular properties.

The counterpart theoretic formalization of modal discourse also departs from the standard formulation by eschewing use of modality operators (Necessarily, Possibly) in favor of quantifiers that range over worlds and 'counterparts' of individuals in those worlds. Lewis put forth a set of primitive predicates and a number of axioms governing CT and a scheme for translating standard modal claims in the language of quantified modal logic into his CT.

In addition to interpreting modal claims about objects and possible worlds, CT can also be applied to the identity of a single object at different points in time. The view that an object can retain its identity over time is often called endurantism, and it claims that objects are ‘wholly present’ at different moments (see the counterpart relation, below). An opposing view is that any object in time is made up of temporal parts or is perduring.

Lewis' view on possible worlds is sometimes called modal realism.

=== The basics ===
The possibilities that CT is supposed to describe are “ways a world might be” or more exactly:

(1) absolutely every way that a world could possibly be is a way that some world is, and

(2) absolutely every way that a part of a world could possibly be is a way that some part of some world is.

Add also the following “principle of recombination,” which Lewis describes this way: “patching together parts of different possible worlds yields another possible world […]. [A]nything can coexist with anything else, […] provided they occupy distinct spatiotemporal positions.” But these possibilities should be restricted by CT.

== The counterpart relation ==
The counterpart relation (C-relation) differs from the notion of identity. Identity is a reflexive, symmetric, and transitive relation. The counterpart relation is only a similarity relation; it needn’t be transitive or symmetric. The C-relation is also known as genidentity, I-relation, and the unity relation.

If identity is shared between objects in different possible worlds then the same object can be said to exist in different possible worlds (a trans-world object, that is, a series of objects sharing a single identity).

=== Parthood relation ===
An important part of the way Lewis's worlds deliver possibilities is the use of the parthood relation. This gives some neat formal machinery, mereology. This is an axiomatic system that uses formal logic to describe the relationship between parts and wholes, and between parts within a whole. Especially important, and most reasonable, according to Lewis, is the strongest form that accepts the existence of mereological sums or the thesis of unrestricted mereological composition.

== The formal theory ==
As a formal theory, counterpart theory can be used to translate sentences into modal quantificational logic. Sentences that seem to be quantifying over possible individuals should be translated into CT. (Explicit primitives and axioms have not yet been stated for the temporal or spatial use of CT.) Let CT be stated in quantificational logic and contain the following primitives:

$Wx$ ($x$ is a possible world)
$Ixy$ ($x$ is in possible world $y$)
$Ax$ ($x$ is actual)
$Cxy$ ($x$ is a counterpart of $y$)

Lewis laid out the following axioms:

A1. $(Ixy \rightarrow Wy)$
(Nothing is in anything except a world)

A2. $((Ixy \land Ixz) \rightarrow y=z)$
(Nothing is in two worlds)

A3. $(Cxy \rightarrow \exists z\, Ixz)$
(Whatever is a counterpart is in a world)

A4. $(Cxy \rightarrow \exists z\, Iyz)$
(Whatever has a counterpart is in a world)

A5. $((Ixy \land Izy \land Cxz) \rightarrow x=z)$
(Nothing is a counterpart of anything else in its world)

A6. $(Ixy \rightarrow Cxx)$
(Anything in a world is a counterpart of itself)

A7. $\exists x\, (Wx \land \forall y\, (Iyx \leftrightarrow Ay))$
(Some world contains all and only actual things)

A8. $\exists x\, Ax$
(Something is actual)

It is an uncontroversial assumption to assume that the primitives and the axioms A1 through A8 make the standard counterpart system.

=== Comments on the axioms ===
- A1 excludes individuals that exist in no world at all. The way an individual is in a world is by being a part of that world, so the basic relation is mereological.
- A2 excludes individuals that exist in more than one possible world. But because David Lewis accepts the existence of arbitrary mereological sums there are individuals that exist in several possible worlds, but they are not possible individuals because none of them have the property of being actual. And that is because it is not possible for such a whole to be actual.
- A3 and A4 make counterparts worldbound, excluding an individual that has a non-worldbound counterpart.
- A5 and A6 restrict the use of the CT-relation so that it is used within a possible world when and only when it is stood in by an entity to itself.
- A7 and A8 make one possible world the unique actual world.

=== Principles that are not accepted in normal CT ===
R1. $(Cxy \rightarrow Cyx)$
(Symmetry of the counterpart relation)

R2. $((Cxy \land Cyz) \rightarrow Cxz)$
(Transitivity of the counterpart relation)

R3. $((Cy_1x \land Cy_2x \land Iy_1w_1 \land Iy_2w_2 \land y_1 \neq y_2) \rightarrow w_1 \neq w_2)$
(Nothing in any world has more than one counterpart in any other world)

R4. $((Cyx_1 \land Cyx_2 \land Ix_1w_1 \land Ix_2w_2 \land x_1 \neq x_2) \rightarrow w_1 \neq w_2)$
(No two things in any world have a common counterpart in any other world)

R5. $((Ww_1 \land Ww_2 \land Ixw_1) \rightarrow \exists y\, (Iyw_2 \land Cxy))$
(For any two worlds, anything in one is a counterpart of something in the other)

R6. $((Ww_1 \land Ww_2 \land Ixw_1) \rightarrow \exists y\, (Iyw_2 \land Cyx))$
(For any two worlds, anything in one has some counterpart in the other)

== Motivations for counterpart theory ==
CT can be applied to the relationship between identical objects in different worlds or at different times. Depending on the subject, there are different reasons for accepting CT as a description of the relation between different entities.

=== In possible worlds ===
David Lewis defended modal realism. This is the view that a possible world is a concrete, maximal connected spatio-temporal region. The actual world is one of the possible worlds; it is also concrete. Because a single concrete object demands spatio-temporal connectedness, a possible concrete object can only exist in one possible world. Still, we say true things like: It is possible that Hubert Humphrey won the 1968 US presidential election. How is it true? Humphrey has a counterpart in another possible world that wins the 1968 election in that world.

Lewis also argues against three other alternatives that might be compatible with possibilism: overlapping individuals, trans-world individuals, and haecceity.

Some philosophers, such as Peter van Inwagen, see no problem with identity within a world. Lewis seems to share this attitude. He says:

"… like the Holy Roman Empire, it is badly named. […] In the first place we should bear in mind that Trans-World Airlines is an intercontinental, but not as yet an interplanetary carrier. More important, we should not suppose that we have here any problem with identity.

We never have. Identity is utterly simple and unproblematic. Everything is identical to itself; nothing is ever identical to anything else except itself. There is never any problem about what makes something identical to itself; nothing can ever fail to be. And there is never any problem about what makes two things identical; two things never can be identical.

There might be a problem about how to define identity to someone sufficiently lacking in conceptual resources — we note that it won't suffice to teach him certain rules of inference — but since such unfortunates are rare, even among philosophers, we needn't worry much if their condition is incurable.

We do state plenty of genuine problems in terms of identity. But we needn't state them so.”

==== Overlapping individuals ====
An overlapping individual has a part in the actual world and a part in another world. Because identity is not problematic, we get overlapping individuals by having overlapping worlds. Two worlds overlap if they share a common part. But some properties of overlapping objects are, for Lewis, troublesome.

The problem is with an object's accidental intrinsic properties, such as shape and weight, which supervene on its parts. Humphrey could have the property of having six fingers on his left hand. How does he do that? It can't be true that Humphrey has both the property of having six fingers and five fingers on his left hand. What we might say is that he has five fingers at this world and six fingers at that world. But how should these modifiers be understood?

According to McDaniel, if Lewis is right, the defender of overlapping individuals has to accept genuine contradictions or defend the view that every object has all its properties essentially.

How can you be one year older than you are? One way is to say that there is a possible world where you exist. Another way is for you to have a counterpart in that possible world, who has the property of being one year older than you.

==== Trans-world individuals ====
Take Humphrey: if he is a trans-world individual he is the mereological sum of all of the possible Humphreys in the different worlds. He is like a road that goes through different regions. There are parts that overlap, but we can also say that there is a northern part that is connected to the southern part and that the road is the mereological sum of these parts. The same thing with Humphrey. One part of him is in one world, another part in another world.

"It is possible for something to exist if it is possible for the whole to exist. That is, if there is a world at which the whole of it exists. That is, if there is a world such that quantifying only over parts of that world, the whole of it exists. That is, if the whole of it is among the parts of some world. That is, if it is part of some world – and hence not a trans-world individual. Parts of worlds are possible individuals; trans-world individuals are therefore impossible individuals."

==== Haecceity ====
A haecceity or individual essence is a property that only a single object instantiates. Ordinary properties, if one accepts the existence of universals, can be exemplified by more than one object at a time. Another way to explain a haecceity is to distinguish between suchness and thisness, where thisness has a more demonstrative character.

David Lewis gives the following definition of a haecceitistic difference: “two worlds differ in what they represent de re concerning some individual, but do not differ qualitatively in any way.”

CT does not require distinct worlds for distinct possibilities – “a single world may provide many possibilities, since many possible individuals inhabit it." CT can satisfy multiple counterparts in one possible world.

=== Temporal parts ===
Perdurantism is the view that material objects are not wholly present at any single instant of time; instead, some temporal parts is said to be present. Sometimes, especially in the theory of relativity as it is expressed by Minkowski, the path traced by an object through spacetime. According to Ted Sider, “Temporal parts theory is the claim that time is like space in one particular respect, namely, with respect to parts.” Sider associates endurantism with a C-relation between temporal parts.

Sider defends a revised way of counting. Instead of counting individual objects, timeline slices or the temporal parts of an object are used. Sider discusses an example of counting road segments instead of roads simpliciter. Sider argues that, even if we knew that some material object would go through some fission and split into two, "we would not say" that there are two objects located at the same spacetime region.

How can one predicate temporal properties of these momentary temporal parts? It is here that the C-relation comes in play. Sider proposed the sentence: "Ted was once a boy." The truth condition of this sentence is that "there exists some person stage x prior to the time of utterance, such that x is a boy, and x bears the temporal counterpart relation to Ted."

== Counterpart theory and the necessity of identity ==
Kripke's three lectures on proper names and identity, (1980), raised the issues of how we should interpret statements about identity. Take the statement that the Evening Star is identical to the Morning Star. Both are the planet Venus. This seems to be an a posteriori identity statement. We discover that the names designate the same thing. The traditional view, since Kant, has been that statements or propositions that are necessarily true are a priori. But in the end of the sixties Saul Kripke and Ruth Barcan Marcus offered proof for the necessary truth of identity statements. Here is the Kripke's version:

(1) $\forall x\, \Box\, x = x$ [Necessity of self-identity]
(2) $\forall x\, \forall y\, (x = y \rightarrow \forall P\, (Px \rightarrow Py))$ [Leibniz law]
(3) $\forall x\, \forall y\ (x = y \rightarrow (\Box\, x = x \rightarrow \Box\, x = y))$ [From (1) and (2)]
(4) $\forall x\, \forall y\, (x = y \rightarrow \Box\, x = y)$ [From (3) and the following principle: $(\varphi \rightarrow (\top \rightarrow \psi)) \Rightarrow (\varphi \rightarrow \psi)$]

If the proof is correct the distinction between the a priori/a posteriori and necessary/contingent becomes less clear. The same applies if identity statements are necessarily true anyway. The statement that for instance “Water is identical to H_{2}O” is (then) a statement that is necessarily true but a posteriori. If CT is the correct account of modal properties we still can keep the intuition that identity statements are contingent and a priori because counterpart theory understands the modal operator in a different way than standard modal logic.

The relationship between CT and essentialism is of interest. (Essentialism, the necessity of identity, and rigid designators form an important troika of mutual interdependence.) According to David Lewis, claims about an object's essential properties can be true or false depending on context (in Chapter 4.5 in 1986 he calls against constancy, because an absolute conception of essences is constant over the logical space of possibilities). He writes:

But if I ask how things would be if Saul Kripke had come from no sperm and egg but had been brought by a stork, that makes equally good sense. I create a context that makes my question make sense, and to do so it has to be a context that makes origins not be essential.

== Counterpart theory and rigid designators ==
Kripke interpreted proper names as rigid designators where a rigid designator picks out the same object in every possible world. For someone who accepts contingent identity statements the following semantic problem occurs (semantic because we deal with de dicto necessity).

Take a scenario that is mentioned in the paradox of coincidence. A statue (call it “Statue”) is made by melding two pieces of clay together. Those two pieces are called “Clay”. Statue and Clay seem to be identical, they exist at the same time, and we could incinerate them at the same time. The following seems true:

(7) Necessarily, if Statue exists then Statue is identical to Statue.

But,

(8) Necessarily, if Statue exists then Statue is identical to Clay

is false, because it seems possible that Statue could have been made out of two different pieces of clay, and thus its identity to Clay is not necessary.

Counterpart theory, qua-identity, and individual concepts can offer solutions to this problem.

=== Arguments for inconstancy ===
Ted Sider gives roughly the following argument. There is inconstancy if a proposition about the essence of an object is true in one context and false in another. C-relation is a similarity relation. What is similar in one dimension is not similar in another dimension. Therefore, the C-relation can have the same difference and express inconstant judgements about essences.

David Lewis offers another argument. The paradox of coincidence can be solved if we accept inconstancy. We can then say that it is possible for a dishpan and a piece of plastic to coincide, in some context. That context can then be described using CT.

Sider makes the point that David Lewis feels he was forced to defend CT, due to modal realism. Sider uses CT as a solution to the paradox of material coincidence.

=== Counterpart theory compared to qua-theory and individual concepts ===
We assume that contingent identity is real. Then it is informative to compare CT with other theories about how to handle de re representations.

Qua-theory

Kit Fine and Alan Gibbard are defences of qua-theory. According to qua-theory we can talk about some of an object's modal properties. The theory is handy if we don't think it is possible for Socrates to be identical with a piece of bread or a stone. Socrates qua person is essentially a person.

Individual concepts

According to Rudolf Carnap, in modal contexts variables refer to individual concepts instead of individuals. An individual concept is then defined as a function of individuals in different possible worlds. Basically, individual concepts deliver semantic objects or abstract functions instead of real concrete entities as in CT.

=== Counterpart theory and epistemic possibility ===
Kripke accepts the necessity of identity but agrees with the feeling that it still seems that it is possible that Phospherus (the Morning Star) is not identical to Hespherus (the Evening Star). For all we know, it could be that they are different. He says:

What, then, does the intuition that the table might have turned out to have been made of ice or of anything else, that it might even have turned out not to be made of molecules, amount to? I think that it means simply that there might have been a table looking and feeling just like this one and placed in this very position in the room, which was in fact made of ice, In other words, I (or some conscious being) could have been qualitatively in the same epistemic situation that in fact obtains, I could have the same sensory evidence that I in fact have, about a table which was made of ice. The situation is thus akin to the one which inspired the counterpart theorists; when I speak of the possibility of the table turning out to be made of various things, I am speaking loosely. This table itself could not have had an origin different form the one it in fact had, but in a situation qualitatively identical to this one with respect to all evidence I had in advance, the room could have contained a table made of ice in place of this one. Something like counterpart theory is thus applicable to the situation, but it applies only because we are not interested in what might not be true of a table given certain evidence. It is precisely because it is not true that this table might have been made of ice from the Thames that we must turn here to qualitative descriptions and counterparts. To apply these notions to genuine de re modalities, is from the present standpoint, perverse.

So to explain how the illusion of necessity is possible, according to Kripke, CT is an alternative. Therefore, CT forms an important part of our theory about the knowledge of modal intuitions.

== Arguments against counterpart theory ==
The most famous is Kripke's Humphrey objection. Because a counterpart is never identical to something in another possible world Kripke raised the following objection against CT:

Thus if we say "Humphrey might have won the election" (if only he had done such-and-such), we are not talking about something that might have happened to Humphrey but to someone else, a "counterpart". Probably, however, Humphrey could not care less whether someone else, no matter how much resembling him, would have been victorious in another possible world. Thus, Lewis's view seems to me even more bizarre than the usual notions of transworld identification that it replaces.

One way to spell out the meaning of Kripke's claim is by the following imaginary dialogue: (Based on Sider MS)

Against: Kripke means that Humphrey himself doesn’t have the property of possibly winning the election, because it is only the counterpart that wins.

For: The property of possibly winning the election is the property of the counterpart.

Against: But they can't be the same property because Humphrey has different attitudes to them: he cares about he himself having the property of possibly winning the election. He doesn’t care about the counterpart having the property of possibly winning the election.

For: But properties don't work the same way as objects, our attitudes towards them can be different, because we have different descriptions – they are still the same properties. That lesson is taught by the paradox of analysis.

CT is inadequate if it can't translate all modal sentences or intuitions. Fred Feldman mentioned two sentences:

(1) I could have been quite unlike what I in fact am.
(2) I could have been more like what you in fact are than like what I in fact am. At the same time, you could have been more like what I in fact am than what you in fact are.

== See also ==
- Graeme Robertson Forbes
- Identity (philosophy)
- Many-worlds interpretation
