= Genidentity =

Existential relationship underlying the genesis of an object from one moment to the next

As introduced by Kurt Lewin, genidentity is an existential relationship underlying the genesis of an object from one moment to the next. What we usually consider to be an object really consists of multiple entities, which are the phases of the object at various times. Two objects are not identical because they have the same properties in common, but because one has developed from the other. Lewin introduced the concept in his 1922 Habilitationsschrift Der Begriff der Genese in Physik, Biologie und Entwicklungsgeschichte. It is today perhaps the only surviving evidence of Lewin's influence on the philosophy of science. However, this concept never became an object of widespread discussion and debate in its own terms. Rather, it was extracted from its context by philosophers such as Rudolf Carnap, Hans Hermes, Hans Reichenbach, Adolph Grünbaum, and Bas van Fraassen who incorporated this concept into their own theories such as the topology of the universe or the axiomatization of mechanics. Lewin's idea was to compare and contrast the concept of genidentity in various branches of science, thereby laying bare the characteristic structure of each and making their classification possible in the first place.

== Classification of Natural Sciences ==
In his thesis mentioned above, Lewin compares physics (in which he includes chemistry) and biology (which he divides into organic biology and evolutionary history of life). A comparison of this kind presupposes that it is possible to find equivalent notions in both sciences. According to Lewin, the concept of genidentity in the various sciences meets this requirement.

Lewin distinguishes between partial and total genidentity. This is due to the difficulty caused by parts of objects: for instance, an object might disintegrate into several pieces in the course of its development. As we follow such an object through time, only a small portion of it may remain. Lewin says that two objects existing at different times are partly genidentical if at least some part of the later object was present in the earlier object. By contrast, he says that two objects are totally genidentical if and only if at neither of the considered times there is any distinct object partially genidentical to one of the two objects concerned.

Lewin also introduces the idea of viewing physical bodies as links in a so-called development chain. According to this approach, between two totally genidentical objects there always exists, at any intermediate time, an object totally genidentical with each. Thus genidentity implies the existence of an entire infinite series of intermediate objects. In this Lewin sees an analogy between physical objects and real numbers, as defined by so-called Dedekind cuts in the ordering of rational numbers.

Genidentity so defined is postulated to have various characteristics, such as symmetry, transitivity, density, and continuity. When reviewed in the light of contemporary standards of logical precision, it becomes clear that Lewin had the correct intuition, even though he did not have the benefit of a highly developed terminology of definition theory or modern day symbolic logic.

However, genidentity has never been explicitly discussed in the experimental sciences. Rather, it has always been a basic assumption hovering in the background, tacitly assumed. The credit for having made these assumptions explicit for the first time doubtlessly belongs to Kurt Lewin, usually renowned for his psychological work in the field of Gestalt psychology.

== See also ==
- Counterpart theory
- Identity (philosophy)
- Ship of Theseus, Locke's Socks, Grandfather's old axe
