= Mereology =

Study of parts and the wholes they form

Mereology (/mɪəriˈɒlədʒi/; from Greek μέρος 'part' (root: μερε-, mere-) and the suffix -logy, 'study, discussion, science') is the philosophical study of part-whole relationships, also called parthood relationships. As a branch of ontology, mereology examines the connections between parts and their wholes, exploring how components interact within a system. This theory has roots in ancient philosophy, with significant contributions from Plato, Aristotle, and later, medieval and Renaissance thinkers like Thomas Aquinas and John Duns Scotus. Mereology was formally axiomatized in the 20th century by Polish logician Stanisław Leśniewski, who introduced it as part of a comprehensive framework for logic and mathematics, and coined the word "mereology".

Mereological ideas were influential in early § Set theory, and formal mereology continues to be used by some working on the § Foundations of mathematics. Different axiomatizations of mereology have been applied in § Ontology, used in § Linguistic semantics to analyze "mass terms", used in the cognitive sciences, and developed in § General systems theory. Mereology has been combined with topology, for more on which see the article on mereotopology. Mereology is also used in the foundation of Whitehead's point-free geometry, on which see Tarski 1956 and Gerla 1995. Mereology is used in discussions of entities as varied as musical groups, geographical regions, and abstract concepts, demonstrating its applicability to a wide range of philosophical and scientific discourses.

In ontology, mereology is used to formulate the thesis of "composition as identity", the theory that individuals or objects are identical to mereological sums (also called fusions) of their parts. A metaphysical thesis called "mereological monism" suggests that the version of mereology developed by Stanisław Leśniewski and Nelson Goodman (commonly called General Extensional Mereology, or GEM) (Note: Some sources, such as Lando and Koslicki, use the name Classical Extensional Mereology (CEM) for what is here called General Extensional Mereology (GEM). In this article, following the practice of Varzi (1999) and the SEP, the name Classical Extensional Mereology (CEM) is reserved for a weaker theory, defined in § Axiom systems.) serves as the general and exhaustive theory of parthood and composition, at least for a large and significant domain of things. This thesis is controversial, since parthood may not seem to be a transitive relation (as claimed by GEM) in some cases, such as the parthood between organisms and their organs. Nevertheless, GEM's assumptions are very common in mereological frameworks, due largely to Leśniewski influence as the one to first coin the word and formalize the theory: mereological theories commonly assume that everything is a part of itself (reflexivity), that a part of a part of a whole is itself a part of that whole (transitivity), and that two distinct entities cannot each be a part of the other (antisymmetry), so that the parthood relation is a partial order. An alternative is to assume instead that parthood is irreflexive (nothing is ever a part of itself) but still transitive, in which case antisymmetry follows automatically.

== History ==
Informal part-whole reasoning was consciously invoked in metaphysics and ontology from Plato (in particular, in the second half of the Parmenides) and Aristotle onwards, and more or less unwittingly in 19th-century mathematics until the triumph of set theory around 1910. Metaphysical ideas of this era that discuss the concepts of parts and wholes include divine simplicity and the classical conception of beauty.

Ivor Grattan-Guinness (2001) explains part-whole reasoning during the 19th and early 20th centuries, and reviews how Cantor and Peano devised set theory. It appears that the first to reason consciously and at length about parts and wholes was Edmund Husserl, in 1901, in the second volume of Logical Investigations – Third Investigation: "On the Theory of Wholes and Parts" (Husserl 1970 is the English translation). However, the word "mereology" is absent from his writings, and he employed no symbolism even though his doctorate was in mathematics.

Stanisław Leśniewski coined "mereology" in 1927, from the Greek word μέρος (méros, "part"), to refer to a formal theory of part-whole he devised in a series of highly technical papers published between 1916 and 1931, and translated in Leśniewski (1992). Leśniewski's student Alfred Tarski, in his Appendix E to Woodger (1937) and the paper translated as Tarski (1984), greatly simplified Leśniewski's formalism. Other students (and students of students) of Leśniewski elaborated this "Polish mereology" over the course of the 20th century. For a selection of the literature on Polish mereology, see Srzednicki and Rickey (1984). For a survey of Polish mereology, see Simons (1987). Since 1980 or so, however, research on Polish mereology has been almost entirely historical in nature.

A. N. Whitehead planned a fourth volume of Principia Mathematica, on geometry, but never wrote it. His 1914 correspondence with Bertrand Russell reveals that his intended approach to geometry can be seen, with the benefit of hindsight, as mereological in essence. This work culminated in Whitehead (1916) and the mereological systems of Whitehead (1919, 1920).

In 1930, Henry S. Leonard completed a Harvard PhD dissertation in philosophy, setting out a formal theory of the part-whole relation. This evolved into the "calculus of individuals" of Goodman and Leonard (1940). Goodman revised and elaborated this calculus in the three editions of Goodman (1951). The calculus of individuals is the starting point for the post-1970 revival of mereology among logicians, ontologists, and computer scientists, a revival surveyed in Simons (1987), Casati and Varzi (1999), and Cotnoir and Varzi (2021).

== Theory ==
A basic choice in defining a mereological system, is whether to allow things to be considered parts of themselves (reflexivity of parthood). In naive set theory a similar question arises: whether a set is to be considered a "member" of itself. In both cases, "yes" gives rise to paradoxes analogous to Russell's paradox: Let there be an object O such that every object that is not a proper part of itself is a proper part of O. Is O a proper part of itself? No, because no object is a proper part of itself; and yes, because it meets the specified requirement for inclusion as a proper part of O. In set theory, a set is often termed an improper subset of itself. Given such paradoxes, mereology requires an axiomatic formulation.

A mereological "system" is a first-order theory (with identity) whose universe of discourse consists of wholes and their respective parts, collectively called objects. Mereology is a collection of nested and non-nested axiomatic systems, not unlike the case with modal logic.

The treatment, terminology, and hierarchical organization below follow Casati and Varzi (1999: Ch. 3) closely. For a more recent treatment, correcting certain misconceptions, see Hovda (2008). Lower-case letters denote variables ranging over objects. Following each symbolic axiom or definition is the number of the corresponding formula in Casati and Varzi, written in bold.

=== Definitions ===
A mereological system requires at least one primitive binary relation (dyadic predicate). The most conventional choice for such a relation is parthood (also called "inclusion"), "x is a part of y", written Pxy. Nearly all systems require that parthood partially order the universe. The following defined relations, required for the axioms below, follow immediately from parthood alone:

- An immediate defined predicate is "x is a **proper part** of y", written PPxy, which holds (i.e., is satisfied, comes out true) if Pxy is true and Pyx is false. Compared to parthood (which is a partial order), ProperPart is a strict partial order.

$PPxy \leftrightarrow (Pxy \land \lnot Pyx).$ 3.3

An object lacking proper parts is an atom. The mereological universe consists of all objects we wish to think about, and all of their proper parts:

- Overlap: x and y overlap, written Oxy, if there exists an object z such that Pzx and Pzy both hold.

$Oxy \leftrightarrow \exists z[Pzx \land Pzy ].$ 3.1

The parts of z, the "overlap" or "product" of x and y, are precisely those objects that are parts of both x and y.

- Underlap: x and y underlap, written Uxy, if there exists an object z such that x and y are both parts of z.

$Uxy \leftrightarrow \exists z[Pxz \land Pyz ].$ 3.2

Overlap and Underlap are reflexive, symmetric, and intransitive.

Systems vary in what relations they take as primitive and as defined. For example, in extensional mereologies (defined below), parthood can be defined from Overlap as follows:

$Pxy \leftrightarrow \forall z[Ozx \rightarrow Ozy].$ 3.31

=== Notations ===
There have been many notations for mereology. The table below builds on the comparison in Peter Simons, "Parts", page 99.

Operation or term	SEP	Simons	Leonard–Goodman	Tarski	Pietruszczak (Note: Pietruszczak uses the names "part" for proper part, "ingrediens" for part, and "is exterior to" for disjointness.)	Others (comma-separated)
x is a part of y	$Pxy$	$x < y$	$x < y$	$Pxy$	$x \sqsubseteq y$	⊂, ⊆, ≤, ⪯, ⊑
x is a proper part of y	$PPxy$	$x \ll y$	$x \ll y$		$x \sqsubset y$	⊂, ⊊, <
x and y overlap	$Oxy$	$x \circ y$	$x \circ y$		$x \bigcirc y$	0
x and y underlap	$Uxy$				$x \; \mathsf{Un} \; y$	
x and y are disjoint	$Dxy$	$x \mid y$	$x \mid y$		$x \wr y$	∣, )(, Z
the (binary) product of x and y	$x \times y$	$x \cdot y$	$xy$	$x \cap y$ $x \sqcap y$	$x \land y$	
the (binary) sum of x and y	$x + y$	$x + y$	$x + y$	$x \cup y$	$x \sqcup y$	
the universal object (top)	$U$	$U$	$U$	$w$	$U$	a*, Un
x is the sum of the set α		$x\,\mathrm{Su}\,\alpha$	$x\,\mathrm{Fu}\,\alpha$	$x \Sigma \alpha$	$x \; \mathsf{sum} \; \alpha$, $x \; \mathsf{fu} \; \alpha$	S, F
x is the product of the set α		$x\Pr\alpha$	$x\,\mathrm{Nu}\,\alpha$	$x \Pi \alpha$		P, N
the complement of x	$\sim x$	$\bar x$	$-x$	$-x$	$-x$	
the (general) sum of the x such that $\varphi x$	$\sigma x \varphi x$	$\sigma x \varphi x$				
the (general) product of the x such that $\varphi x$	$\pi x\, \varphi x$	$\pi x\, \varphi x$				

=== Axioms ===
The axioms are:

- **Parthood** partially orders the universe:

M1, Reflexive: An object is a part of itself.
$\ Pxx.$ P.1
M2, Antisymmetric: If Pxy and Pyx both hold, then x and y are the same object.
$(Pxy \land Pyx) \rightarrow x = y.$ P.2
M3, Transitive: If Pxy and Pyz, then Pxz.
$(Pxy \land Pyz) \rightarrow Pxz.$ P.3

- M4, Weak Supplementation: If PPxy holds, there exists a z such that Pzy holds but Ozx does not.

$PPxy \rightarrow \exists z[Pzy \land \lnot Ozx].$ P.4

- M5, Strong Supplementation: If Pyx does not hold, there exists a z such that Pzy holds but Ozx does not.

$\lnot Pyx \rightarrow \exists z[Pzy \land \lnot Ozx].$ P.5

- M5', Atomistic Supplementation: If Pxy does not hold, then there exists an atom z such that Pzx holds but Ozy does not.

$\lnot Pxy \rightarrow \exists z[Pzx \land \lnot Ozy \land \lnot \exists v [PPvz]].$ P.5'

- Top: There exists a "universal object", designated W, such that PxW holds for any x.

$\exists W \forall x [PxW].$ 3.20
Top is a theorem if M8 holds.

- Bottom: There exists an atomic "null object", designated N, such that PNx holds for any x.

$\exists N \forall x [PNx].$ 3.22

- M6, Sum: If Uxy holds, there exists a z, called the "sum" or "fusion" of x and y, such that the objects overlapping of z are just those objects that overlap **either** x or y.

$Uxy \rightarrow \exists z \forall v [Ovz \leftrightarrow (Ovx \lor Ovy)].$ P.6

- M7, Product: If Oxy holds, there exists a z, called the "product" of x and y, such that the parts of z are just those objects that are parts of **both** x and y.

$Oxy \rightarrow \exists z \forall v [Pvz \leftrightarrow (Pvx \land Pvy)].$ P.7
If Oxy does not hold, x and y have no parts in common, and the product of x and y is undefined.

- M8, Unrestricted Fusion: Let φ(x) be a first-order formula in which x is a free variable. Then the fusion of all objects satisfying φ exists.

$\exists x [\phi(x)] \to \exists z \forall y [Oyz \leftrightarrow \exists x[\phi (x) \land Oyx]].$ P.8
M8 is also called "General Sum Principle", "Unrestricted Composition", "Unrestricted Sum", "Unrestricted Mereological Composition", or "Universalism". M8 corresponds to the principle of unrestricted comprehension of naive set theory, which gives rise to Russell's paradox. There is no mereological counterpart to this paradox simply because parthood, unlike set membership, is reflexive.

- M8', Unique Fusion: The fusions whose existence M8 asserts are also unique. Also called "Uniqueness of Composition". **P.8'**
- M9, Atomicity: All objects are either atoms or fusions of atoms.

$\exists y[Pyx \land \forall z[\lnot PPzy]].$ P.10

=== Axiom systems ===
Simons (1987), Casati and Varzi (1999) and Hovda (2008) describe many mereological systems whose axioms are taken from the above list. We adopt the boldface nomenclature of Casati and Varzi. The best-known such system is the one called classical extensional mereology, hereinafter abbreviated CEM (other abbreviations are explained below). In CEM, P.1 through P.8' hold as axioms or are theorems. M9, Top, and Bottom are optional.

The systems in the table below are partially ordered by inclusion, in the sense that, if all the theorems of system A are also theorems of system B, but the converse is not necessarily true, then B includes A. The resulting Hasse diagram is similar to Fig. 3.2 in Casati and Varzi (1999: 48).

Label	Name	System	Included Axioms
M1	Reflexivity		
M2	Antisymmetry		
M3	Transitivity	M	M1, M2, M3
M4	Weak Supplementation	MM	**M**, M4
M5	Strong Supplementation	EM	**M**, M5
M5'	Atomistic Supplementation		
M6	Sum		
M7	Product	CEM	**EM**, M6, M7
M8	Unrestricted Fusion	GM	**M**, M8
		GEM	**EM**, M8
M8'	Unique Fusion	GEM	**EM**, M8'
M9	Atomicity	AGEM	M2, M8, M9
		AGEM	**M**, M5', M8

There are two equivalent ways of asserting that the universe is partially ordered: Assume either M1-M3, or that Proper Parthood is transitive and asymmetric, hence a strict partial order. Either axiomatization results in the system M. M2 rules out closed loops formed using Parthood, so that the part relation is well-founded. Sets are well-founded if the axiom of regularity is assumed. The literature contains occasional philosophical and common-sense objections to the transitivity of Parthood.

M4 and M5 are two ways of asserting supplementation, the mereological analog of set complementation, with M5 being stronger because M4 is derivable from M5. M and M4 yield minimal mereology, MM. Reformulated in terms of Proper Part, MM is Simons's (1987) preferred minimal system.

In any system in which M5 or M5' are assumed or can be derived, then it can be proved that two objects having the same proper parts are identical. This property is known as Extensionality, a term borrowed from set theory, for which extensionality is the defining axiom. Mereological systems in which Extensionality holds are termed extensional, a fact denoted by including the letter E in their symbolic names.

M6 asserts that any two underlapping objects have a unique sum; M7 asserts that any two overlapping objects have a unique product. If the universe is finite or if Top is assumed, then the universe is closed under Sum. Universal closure of Product and of supplementation relative to W requires Bottom. W and N are, evidently, the mereological analog of the universal and empty sets, and Sum and Product are, likewise, the analogs of set-theoretical union and intersection. If M6 and M7 are either assumed or derivable, the result is a mereology with closure.

Because Sum and Product are binary operations, M6 and M7 admit the sum and product of only a finite number of objects. The Unrestricted Fusion axiom, M8, enables taking the sum of infinitely many objects. The same holds for Product, when defined. At this point, mereology often invokes set theory, but any recourse to set theory is eliminable by replacing a formula with a quantified variable ranging over a universe of sets by a schematic formula with one free variable. The formula comes out true (is satisfied) whenever the name of an object that would be a member of the set (if it existed) replaces the free variable. Hence any axiom with sets can be replaced by an axiom schema with monadic atomic subformulae. M8 and M8' are schemas of just this sort. The syntax of a first-order theory can describe only a denumerable number of sets; hence, only denumerably many sets may be eliminated in this fashion, but this limitation is not binding for the sort of mathematics contemplated here.

If M8 holds, then W exists for infinite universes. Hence, Top need be assumed only if the universe is infinite and M8 does not hold. Top (postulating W) is not controversial, but Bottom (postulating N) is. Leśniewski rejected Bottom, and most mereological systems follow his example (an exception is the work of Richard Milton Martin). Hence, while the universe is closed under sum, the product of objects that do not overlap is typically undefined. A system with W but not N is isomorphic to:

- a Boolean algebra lacking a 0;
- a join semilattice bounded from above by 1. Binary fusion and W interpret join and 1, respectively.

Postulating N renders all possible products definable, but also transforms classical extensional mereology into a set-free model of Boolean algebra.

If sets are admitted, M8 asserts the existence of the fusion of all members of any nonempty set. Any mereological system in which M8 holds is called general, and its name includes G. In any general mereology, M6 and M7 are provable. Adding M8 to an extensional mereology results in general extensional mereology, abbreviated GEM; moreover, the extensionality renders the fusion unique. On the converse, however, if the fusion asserted by M8 is assumed unique, so that M8' replaces M8, then—as Tarski (1929) had shown—M3 and M8' suffice to axiomatize GEM, a remarkably economical result. Simons (1987: 38–41) lists a number of GEM theorems.

M2 and a finite universe necessarily imply Atomicity, namely that everything either is an atom or includes atoms among its proper parts. If the universe is infinite, Atomicity requires M9. Adding M9 to any mereological system, X results in the atomistic variant thereof, denoted AX. Atomicity permits economies, for instance, assuming that M5' implies Atomicity and extensionality, and yields an alternative axiomatization of AGEM.

== Ontology ==
In ontology there are many troubling questions pertaining to parts and wholes. One question addresses constitution and persistence, another asks about composition.

=== Mereological constitution ===
In ontology, there are several puzzles concerning cases of mereological constitution, that is, what makes up a whole. There is still a concern with parts and wholes, but instead of looking at what parts make up a whole, the emphasis is on what a thing is made of, such as its materials, e.g., the bronze in a bronze statue. Below are two of the main puzzles that philosophers use to discuss constitution.

Ship of Theseus: Briefly, the puzzle goes something like this. There is a ship called the Ship of Theseus. Over time, the boards start to rot, so we remove the boards and place them in a pile. First question, is the ship made of the new boards the same as the ship that had all the old boards? Second, if we reconstruct a ship using all of the old planks, etc. from the Ship of Theseus, and we also have a ship that was built out of new boards (each added one-by-one over time to replace old decaying boards), which ship is the real Ship of Theseus?

Statue and Lump of Clay: Roughly, a sculptor decides to mold a statue out of a lump of clay. At time $t_1$ the sculptor has a lump of clay. After many manipulations at time $t_2$ there is a statue. The question asked is, is the lump of clay and the statue (numerically) identical? If so, how and why?

Constitution typically has implications for views on persistence: how does an object persist over time if any of its parts (materials) change or are removed, as is the case with humans who lose cells, change height, hair color, memories, and yet we are said to be the same person today as we were when we were first born. For example, Ted Sider is the same today as he was when he was born—he just changed. But how can this be if many parts of Ted today did not exist when Ted was just born? Is it possible for things, such as organisms to persist? And if so, how? There are several views that attempt to answer this question. Some of the views are as follows (note, there are several other views):

(a) Constitution view. This view accepts cohabitation. That is, two objects share exactly the same matter. Here, it follows, that there are no temporal parts.

(b) Mereological essentialism, which states that the only objects that exist are quantities of matter, which are things defined by their parts. The object persists if matter is removed (or the form changes); but the object ceases to exist if any matter is destroyed.

(c) Dominant Sorts. This is the view that tracing is determined by which sort is dominant; they reject cohabitation. For example, lump does not equal statue because they're different "sorts".

(d) Nihilism—which makes the claim that no objects exist, except simples, so there is no persistence problem.

(e) 4-dimensionalism or temporal parts (may also go by the names perdurantism or exdurantism), which roughly states that aggregates of temporal parts are intimately related. For example, two roads merging, momentarily and spatially, are still one road, because they share a part.

(f) 3-dimensionalism (may also go by the name endurantism), where the object is wholly present. That is, the persisting object retains numerical identity.

=== Mereological composition ===
One question that is addressed by philosophers is which is more fundamental: parts, wholes, or neither? Another pressing question is called the special composition question (SCQ): For any Xs, when is it the case that there is a Y such that the Xs compose Y? This question has caused philosophers to run in three different directions: nihilism, universal composition (UC), or a moderate view (restricted composition). The first two views are considered extreme since the first denies composition, and the second allows any and all non-spatially overlapping objects to compose another object. The moderate view encompasses several theories that try to make sense of SCQ without saying 'no' to composition or 'yes' to unrestricted composition.

==== Fundamentality ====
There are philosophers who are concerned with the question of fundamentality. That is, which is more ontologically fundamental: the parts or their wholes? There are several responses to this question, though one of the default assumptions is that the parts are more fundamental. That is, the whole is grounded in its parts. This is the mainstream view. Another view, explored by Schaffer (2010), is monism, where the parts are grounded in the whole. Schaffer does not just mean that, say, the parts that make up my body are grounded in my body. Rather, Schaffer argues that the whole cosmos is more fundamental and everything else is a part of the cosmos. Then, there is the identity theory which claims that there is no hierarchy or fundamentality to parts and wholes. Instead wholes are just (or equivalent to) their parts. There can also be a two-object view which says that the wholes are not equal to the parts—they are numerically distinct from one another. Each of these theories has benefits and costs associated with them.

==== Special composition question ====
Philosophers want to know when some Xs compose something Y. There are several kinds of response:

- One response is nihilism. According to nihilism, there are no mereological complex objects (composite objects), only simples. Nihilists do not entirely reject composition because they think simples compose themselves, but this is a different point. More formally, nihilists would say: Necessarily, for any non-overlapping Xs, there is an object composed of the Xs if and only if there is only one of the Xs. This theory, though well explored, has its own problems: it seems to contradict experience and common sense, to be incompatible with atomless gunk, and to be unsupported by space-time physics.
- Another prominent response is universal composition (UC). According to UC, as long as Xs do not spatially overlap, they can compose a complex object. Universal compositionalists also support unrestricted composition. More formally: Necessarily, for any non-overlapping Xs, there is a Y such that Y is composed of the Xs. For example, someone's left thumb, the top half of another person's right shoe, and a quark in the center of their galaxy can compose a complex object. This theory also has some drawbacks, most notably that it allows for far too many objects.
- A third response (perhaps less explored than the other two) includes a range of restricted composition views. There are several views, but they all share an idea: that there is a restriction on what counts as a complex object: some (but not all) Xs come together to compose a complex Y. Some of these theories include:

(a) Contact—Xs compose a complex Y if and only if the Xs are in contact;

(b) Fastenation—Xs compose a complex Y if and only if the Xs are fastened;

(c) Cohesion—Xs compose a complex Y if and only if the Xs cohere (cannot be pulled apart or moved in relation to each other without breaking);

(d) Fusion—Xs compose a complex Y if and only if the Xs are fused (joined together such that there is no boundary);

(e) Organicism—Xs compose a complex Y if and only if either the activities of the Xs constitute a life or there is only one of the Xs; and

(f) Brutal Composition—"It's just the way things are." There is no true, nontrivial, and finitely long answer.

Many more hypotheses continue to be explored. A common problem with these theories is that they are vague. It remains unclear what "fastened" or "life" mean, for example. And there are other problems with the restricted composition responses, many of them which depend on which theory is being discussed.

- A fourth response is deflationism. According to deflationism, the way the term "exist" is used varies, and thus all the above answers to the SCQ can be correct when indexed to the appropriate meaning of "exist". Further, there is no privileged way in which the term "exist" must be used. There is therefore no privileged answer to the SCQ, since there are no privileged conditions for when Xs compose Y. Instead, the debate is reduced to a mere verbal dispute rather than a genuine ontological debate. In this way, the SCQ is part of a larger debate in general ontological realism and anti-realism. While deflationism successfully avoids the SCQ, it comes at the cost of ontological anti-realism, such that nature has no objective reality, for, if there is no privileged way to objectively affirm the existence of objects, nature itself must have no objectivity.

== Mathematics ==
The 11 exhaustive logical relations. These diagrams are fundamental to mereotopology, as they illustrate the distinction between tangential and non-tangential parts, a key concept in the mathematical formalization of part-whole relations.

Mereology was influential in early set theory, and has been used in work in the foundations of mathematics, especially by nominalists.

=== Set theory ===
The reassuring phrase 'mere aggregates' must be received warily as a description of classes. Aggregates, perhaps; but not in the sense of composite concrete objects or heaps. Continental United States is an extensive physical body (of arbitrary depth) having the several states as parts; at the same time it is a physical body having the several counties as parts. It is the same concrete object, regardless of the conceptual dissections imposed; the heap of states and the heap of counties are identical. The class of states, however, cannot be identified with the class of counties; for there is much that we want to affirm of the one class and deny of the other. We want to say e.g. that the one class has exactly 48 members, while the other has 3075. We want to say that Delaware is a member of the first class and not of the second, and that Nantucket is a member of the second class and not of the first. These classes, unlike the single concrete heaps which their members compose, must be accepted as two entities of a non-spatial and abstract kind.

— W.V.O. Quine, Mathematical Logic

From the beginnings of set theory, there has been a dispute between conceiving of sets "mereologically", where a set is the mereological sum of its elements, and conceiving of sets "collectively", where a set is an entity defined by intransitive membership, imposing additional structure upon urelements. Mereologically, if "Uniqueness of Composition" is accepted (see § Axioms), the objects a,b,c determine just the one fusion a+b+c, but collectively, the urelements a,b,c may be used to generate infinitely many sets: {a,b,c}; {a, {b, c}}; {{a}, {b}, {c}}; {{{a}}, {b}, {c}}; etc. The collective conception is now dominant, but some of the earliest set theorists adhered to the mereological conception: Richard Dedekind, in "Was sind und was sollen die Zahlen?" (1888), avoided the empty set and used the same symbol for set membership and set inclusion, which are two signs that he conceived of sets mereologically. Similarly, Ernst Schröder, in "Vorlesungen über die Algebra der Logik" (1890), also used the mereological conception. It was Gottlob Frege, in a 1895 review of Schröder's work, who first laid out the difference between collections and mereological sums. The fact that Ernst Zermelo adopted the collective conception when he wrote his influential 1908 axiomatization of set theory is certainly significant for, though it does not fully explain, its current popularity.

In set theory, singletons are "atoms" that have no (non-empty) proper parts; set theory where sets cannot be built up from unit sets is a nonstandard type of set theory, called non-well-founded set theory. The calculus of individuals was thought to require that an object either have no proper parts, in which case it is an "atom", or be the mereological sum of atoms. Eberle (1970), however, showed how to construct a calculus of individuals lacking "atoms", i.e., one where every object has a "proper part", so that the universe is infinite.

A detailed comparison between mereology, set theory, and a semantic "ensemble theory" is presented in chapter 13 of Bunt (1985); when David Lewis wrote his famous § Parts of Classes, he found that "its main thesis had been anticipated in" Bunt's ensemble theory.

==== Parts of Classes ====
Philosopher David Lewis, in his 1991 work Parts of Classes, axiomatized Zermelo-Fraenkel (ZFC) set theory using only classical mereology, plural quantification, and a primitive singleton-forming operator, governed by axioms that resemble the axioms for "successor" in Peano arithmetic. This contrasts with more usual axiomatizations of ZFC, which use only the primitive notion of membership. Lewis's work is named after his thesis that a class's subclasses are mereological parts of the class (in Lewis's usage, this means that a set's subsets, not counting the empty set, are parts of the set); this thesis has been disputed.

Michael Potter, a creator of Scott–Potter set theory, has criticized Lewis's work for failing to make set theory any more easily comprehensible, since Lewis says of his primitive singleton operator that, given the necessity (perceived by Lewis) of avoiding philosophically motivated mathematical revisionism, "I have to say, gritting my teeth, that somehow, I know not how, we do understand what it means to speak of singletons." Potter says Lewis "could just as easily have said, gritting his teeth, that somehow, he knows not how, we do understand what it means to speak of membership, in which case there would have been no need for the rest of the book."

Forrest (2002) revised Lewis's analysis by first formulating a generalization of CEM, called "Heyting mereology", whose sole nonlogical primitive is Proper Part, assumed transitive and antireflexive. According to this theory, there exists a "fictitious" null individual that is a proper part of every individual; two schemas assert that every lattice join exists (lattices are complete) and that meet distributes over join. On this Heyting mereology, Forrest erects a theory of pseudosets, adequate for all purposes to which sets have been put.

=== Foundations of mathematics ===
Mereology was influential in early conceptions of set theory (see § Set theory), which is currently thought of as a foundation for all mathematical theories. Even after the currently-dominant "collective" conception of sets became prevalent, mereology has sometimes been developed as an alternative foundation, especially by authors who were nominalists and therefore rejected abstract objects such as sets. The advantage of mereology for nominalists is its relative ontological economy compared to set theory, since mereology, when Uniqueness of Composition is accepted, will generate at most one entity from some given entities (namely their sum or fusion), whereas infinitely many sets are generated from just one urelement (e.g. Wikipedia, {Wikipedia}, {{Wikipedia}}, {{{Wikipedia}}}, {{{{Wikipedia}}}} ...). Some philosophers, such as David Lewis, have gone further and believed that mereological sums are not an additional ontological commitment beyond their elements, although this is disputed.

Mereology may still be valuable to non-nominalists: Eberle (1970) defended the "ontological innocence" of mereology, which is the idea that one can employ mereology regardless of one's ontological stance regarding sets. This innocence results from mereology being formalizable in either of two equivalent ways: quantified variables ranging over a universe of sets, or schematic predicates with a single free variable.

Still, Stanisław Leśniewski and Nelson Goodman, who developed Classical Extensional Mereology, were nominalists, and consciously developed mereology as an alternative to set theory as a foundation of mathematics. Goodman defended the Principle of Nominalism, which states that whenever two entities have the same basic constituents, they are identical. Most mathematicians and philosophers have accepted set theory as a legitimate and valuable foundation for mathematics, effectively rejecting the Principle of Nominalism in favor of some other theory, such as mathematical platonism. David Lewis, whose § Parts of Classes attempted to reconstruct set theory using mereology, was also a nominalist.

Richard Milton Martin, who was also a nominalist, employed a version of the calculus of individuals throughout his career, starting in 1941. Goodman and Quine (1947) tried to develop the natural and real numbers using the calculus of individuals, but were mostly unsuccessful; Quine did not reprint that article in his Selected Logic Papers. In a series of chapters in the books he published in the last decade of his life, Richard Milton Martin set out to do what Goodman and Quine had abandoned 30 years prior. A recurring problem with attempts to ground mathematics in mereology is how to build up the theory of relations while abstaining from set-theoretic definitions of the ordered pair. Martin argued that Eberle's (1970) theory of relational individuals solved this problem.

Burgess and Rosen (1997) provide a survey of attempts to found mathematics without using set theory, such as using mereology.

== General systems theory ==
In general systems theory, mereological notions of part, whole and boundary are used to describe how complex systems can be decomposed and recomposed. Early work by Mihajlo D. Mesarovic and collaborators on multilevel and hierarchical control treated each level of organization as a system with its own internal structure and environment, while at the same time regarding each level as a component of a more inclusive system. Their formalism makes explicit use of system boundaries, interfaces and mappings between subsystems, and is often cited as a paradigmatic application of rigorous part–whole analysis in systems theory.

A complementary engineering tradition originates with Gabriel Kron's Diakoptics, or "method of tearing", in which a large network or field problem is split into subproblems whose solutions are later recombined to obtain the behaviour of the original system. Later authors showed that diakoptics can be understood using algebraic topology, with the interfaces between subsystems represented by shared chains or cochains, so that the overall method operates on a structured mereological decomposition of the network. Building on Kron, Keith Bowden developed "hierarchical tearing", a multilevel variant in which subsystems are recursively partitioned into sub-subsystems, and argued that diakoptics provides the basis for an "ontology of engineering" that takes networks, components and their interconnections as the primary units of analysis. In these approaches, the parts of a system are not merely smaller pieces of the whole but can carry "holographic" information about it, since behaviour at the interfaces encodes constraints coming from the rest of the system.

The same part–whole perspective appears in work that combines mereological ideas with sheaf theory, topos theory and category theory. Joseph Goguen pioneered the use of categories and sheaves in general systems theory and in the semantics of distributed and concurrent systems, treating local behaviours over components or regions as "sections" that can be glued together along their overlaps to produce global behaviour. In theoretical computer science, Steve Vickers has argued that locale theory and topos theory provide natural mathematical settings for modelling specifications and state spaces as systems of "observable parts": basic opens correspond to pieces of information, their overlaps encode compatibility, and their joins represent more complete states. These frameworks make precise how global structures emerge from compatible local data, closely mirroring mereological intuitions about how wholes depend on patterns of overlap among their parts.

Mereological themes also surface when general systems theory is applied to theoretical physics. Bowden has suggested that diakoptic and holographic methods can be interpreted as forms of "physical computation", in which physical processes perform the calculations required to propagate constraints between parts of a system. Tom Etter has proposed recasting aspects of quantum mechanics in explicitly mereological terms, treating quantum "links" or correlations as relations among parts of a distributed process and arguing that the algebraic structure of quantum theory can be understood as arising from systematic constraints on how such parts fit together. In such work, the focus is not only on what entities exist but on how they are nested, overlapped and dynamically related, reinforcing the role of mereology as a unifying formal thread within general systems theory.

== Linguistic semantics ==
In formal semantics and cognitive science, mereology has been used extensively to model the meanings of mass nouns, count nouns, plurals, measure phrases, and event predicates. A common assumption is that the domain of individuals (and often the domain of events) forms a lattice or sum structure, equipped with a mereological part-of relation and a sum (or fusion) operation. On this view, entities can combine by sum (fusion) and stand in part–whole relations, and many linguistic phenomena are captured in terms of these operations and relations.

=== Mass–count distinction and measure phrases ===
One of the earliest and most developed applications of mereology in linguistics concerns the mass–count distinction. Bunt's ensemble-theoretic semantics treats mass terms such as water, sand, or gold as denoting sets of mereological sums of small portions of matter, rather than sets of discrete objects. This allows the semantics to capture characteristic properties of mass nouns, such as cumulative reference: if one quantity is water and another is water, then their mereological sum is also water:

- There is water in the glass, and there is water in the jug ⟶ there is water in the glass-and-jug together.

By contrast, typical count nouns like book or apple are modeled as denoting sets of atoms in the mereological structure: minimal, indivisible individuals relative to the context. The sum of two atoms is not itself an atom, which helps explain why two books cannot normally be referred to as a book.

Mereological structures have also been used to analyze measure expressions such as three liters of water or two kilos of rice. In many approaches, a homomorphism maps the mereological domain of quantities of stuff onto a numerical measurement scale, preserving sums: the measure of a sum equals the sum of the measures of its parts, at least when the parts are disjoint. This connection between mereology and measurement is used to explain why sentences such as The water in the two bottles weighs three kilos can be interpreted as talking about the total mass of a mereological sum of quantities of water.

Mereology has also been applied to more complex mass expressions, including so-called object mass nouns such as furniture, luggage, or jewelry, which behave grammatically like mass nouns but seem to refer to collections of discrete objects. These cases put pressure on simple extensional mereological characterizations of the mass–count distinction and have motivated refinements of the theory and alternative proposals.

=== Plurals, distributivity and collectivity ===
Mereology also plays a central role in semantic theories of plurals. In Link's influential lattice-theoretic approach, singular individual denotations are atoms in a mereological structure, while plural denotations (e.g. the boys) are sums of such atoms. This allows plural predicates to be defined in terms of their behavior on sums. For example, the cumulative behavior of many plural and mass predicates can be stated in mereological terms:

- If a and b are sums of boys that laugh, their sum a+b is also something that laughs.
- If a and b are quantities of water, their sum a+b is still water.

The sum-based representation of plural individuals helps to account for the ambiguity between collective and distributive readings in sentences such as:

- The boys lifted the piano.

On a collective reading, only the sum of boys is required to stand in the lifting relation to the piano. On a distributive reading, each atomic part of that sum (each boy) must lift the piano individually. In Link-style frameworks, distributive readings can be modeled by operators that distribute predicates over the atomic parts of a plural sum, while collective readings apply the predicate to the sum as a whole.

Mereology-based plural semantics has also been used to model more complex patterns such as cumulative readings (Three boys carried five boxes), where the sentence is true as long as the relevant sums of boys and boxes stand in the carrying relation, without specifying a one-to-one pairing.

=== Events, aspect and verbal predicates ===
Beyond the nominal domain, mereology has been applied to the semantics of events and aspect. In many event semantics frameworks, events form a mereological structure parallel to that of individuals: complex events are sums of simpler events, and parthood corresponds to temporal or causal inclusion of subevents.

Krifka, in particular, links the mereological structure of events to that of nominal reference. He shows that the distinction between telic and atelic verbal predicates parallels the distinction between quantized and cumulative nominal denotations. For example:

- Mary drank beer for ten minutes. – an atelic predicate whose event denotation is closed under taking proper parts: any proper temporal part of a beer-drinking event is still a beer-drinking event.
- Mary drank a glass of beer in ten minutes. – a telic predicate whose event denotation has inherent endpoints: proper subevents in general do not count as completed drink-a-glass-of-beer events.

On this view, the mereology of nominal arguments (for instance, whether an NP denotes a quantized or cumulative set of individuals) can systematically affect the mereological structure of events, and hence the aspectual interpretation of the clause.

Mereological tools have also been used to analyze path expressions and spatial adverbials, for instance in sentences such as The planes flew above and below the clouds. Here, the parts of a complex path or region (segments above vs. below the clouds) can be related to parts of the overall motion event using mereological and often mereotopological relations (parthood plus contact or connection).

=== Alternative formalisms and limitations ===
While mereology has provided a powerful set of tools for modeling nominal and event semantics, its application to natural language is not uncontroversial. Nicolas argues that purely mereological (or lattice-theoretic) treatments of mass nouns are too weak to capture certain "intermediate" readings and identity statements involving masses, and advocates using plural logic instead, where mass terms can behave like plural terms that refer to several things at once. Other authors have combined mereology with topological notions (mereotopology) in order to address problems such as the minimal-parts problem and to model notions like connectedness and contact that matter for the interpretation of mass and count expressions.

Moreover, the ordinary-language phrase part of is highly polysemous and context-sensitive. It can express, among other things, spatial inclusion (the handle is part of the door), group membership (She is part of the team), temporal inclusion (that episode is part of the series), and even looser relations of relevance (this is part of the problem). Simons emphasizes that many of these usages do not correspond straightforwardly to a single precise mereological relation, which complicates any attempt to read natural-language part as a simple parthood predicate Pxy.

Because of these difficulties, some authors adopt a cautious stance about the scope of formal mereology in natural language semantics. Casati and Varzi, for example, explicitly restrict their ontology to physical objects and spatial regions, and warn against assuming that all ordinary part–whole talk can be faithfully rendered in terms of a single, global mereological relation. Nonetheless, mereology—often in combination with additional structure such as topology, ordering, or measurement—remains an important component of many contemporary theories of linguistic meaning.

== See also ==
- Achille Varzi (philosopher)
- Emergence
- Glossary of mereology
- Gunk (mereology)
- Holism
- Holon (philosophy)
- Implicate and explicate order according to David Bohm
- Laws of Form by G. Spencer-Brown
- Mereological essentialism
- Mereological nihilism
- Mereotopology
- Meronomy
- Meronymy
- Monad (philosophy)
- Plural quantification
- Quantifier variance
- Simple (philosophy)
- Whitehead's point-free geometry

== Sources ==
- Bowden, Keith, 1991. Hierarchical Tearing: An Efficient Holographic Algorithm for System Decomposition, Int. J. General Systems, Vol. 24(1), pp 23–38.
- Bowden, Keith, 1998. Huygens Principle, Physics and Computers. Int. J. General Systems, Vol. 27(1–3), pp. 9–32.
- Bunt, Harry, 1985. Mass terms and model-theoretic semantics. Cambridge Univ. Press.
- Burgess, John P., and Rosen, Gideon, 1997. A Subject with No Object. Oxford Univ. Press.
- Burkhardt, H., and Dufour, C.A., 1991, "Part/Whole I: History" in Burkhardt, H., and Smith, B., eds., Handbook of Metaphysics and Ontology. Muenchen: Philosophia Verlag.
- Casati, Roberto, and Varzi, Achille C., 1999. Parts and Places: the structures of spatial representation. MIT Press.
- Cotnoir, A. J., and Varzi, Achille C., 2021, Mereology, Oxford University Press.
- Eberle, Rolf, 1970. Nominalistic Systems. Kluwer.
- Etter, Tom, 1996. Quantum Mechanics as a Branch of Mereology in Toffoli T., et al., PHYSCOMP96, Proceedings of the Fourth Workshop on Physics and Computation, New England Complex Systems Institute.
- Etter, Tom, 1998. Process, System, Causality and Quantum Mechanics. SLAC-PUB-7890, Stanford Linear Accelerator Centre.
- Forrest, Peter, 2002, "Nonclassical mereology and its application to sets", Notre Dame Journal of Formal Logic 43: 79–94.
- Gerla, Giangiacomo, (1995). "Pointless Geometries", in Buekenhout, F., Kantor, W. eds., "Handbook of incidence geometry: buildings and foundations". North-Holland: 1015–31.
- Goodman, Nelson, 1977 (1951). The Structure of Appearance. Kluwer.
- Goodman, Nelson, and Quine, Willard, 1947, "Steps toward a constructive nominalism", Journal of Symbolic Logic 12: 97–122.
- Gruszczynski, R., and Pietruszczak, A., 2008, "Full development of Tarski's geometry of solids", Bulletin of Symbolic Logic 14: 481–540. A system of geometry based on Lesniewski's mereology, with basic properties of mereological structures.
- Hovda, Paul, 2008, "What is classical mereology?" Journal of Philosophical Logic 38(1): 55–82.
- Husserl, Edmund, 1970. Logical Investigations, Vol. 2. Findlay, J.N., trans. Routledge.
- Kron, Gabriel, 1963, Diakoptics: The Piecewise Solution of Large Scale Systems. Macdonald, London.
- Lewis, David K., 1991. Parts of Classes. Blackwell.
- Leonard, H. S., and Goodman, Nelson, 1940, "The calculus of individuals and its uses", Journal of Symbolic Logic 5: 45–55.
- Leśniewski, Stanisław, 1992. Collected Works. Surma, S.J., Srzednicki, J.T., Barnett, D.I., and Rickey, V.F., editors and translators. Kluwer.
- Lucas, J. R., 2000. Conceptual Roots of Mathematics. Routledge. Ch. 9.12 and 10 discuss mereology, mereotopology, and the related theories of A.N. Whitehead, all strongly influenced by the unpublished writings of David Bostock.
- Mesarovic, M.D., Macko, D., and Takahara, Y., 1970, "Theory of Multilevel, Hierarchical Systems". Academic Press.
- Nicolas, David, 2008, "Mass nouns and plural logic", Linguistics and Philosophy 31(2): 211–44.
- Pietruszczak, Andrzej, 1996, "Mereological sets of distributive classes", Logic and Logical Philosophy 4: 105–22. Constructs, using mereology, mathematical entities from set theoretical classes.
- Pietruszczak, Andrzej, 2005, "Pieces of mereology", Logic and Logical Philosophy 14: 211–34. Basic mathematical properties of Lesniewski's mereology.
- Pietruszczak, Andrzej, 2018, Metamerology, Nicolaus Copernicus University Scientific Publishing House.
- Potter, Michael, 2004. Set Theory and Its Philosophy. Oxford Univ. Press.
- Simons, Peter, 1987 (reprinted 2000). Parts: A Study in Ontology. Oxford Univ. Press.
- Srzednicki, J. T. J., and Rickey, V. F., eds., 1984. Lesniewski's Systems: Ontology and Mereology. Kluwer.
- Tarski, Alfred, 1984 (1956), "Foundations of the Geometry of Solids" in his Logic, Semantics, Metamathematics: Papers 1923–38. Woodger, J., and Corcoran, J., eds. and trans. Hackett.
- Varzi, Achille C., 2007, "Spatial Reasoning and Ontology: Parts, Wholes, and Locations" in Aiello, M. et al., eds., Handbook of Spatial Logics. Springer-Verlag: 945–1038.
- Whitehead, A. N., 1916, "La Theorie Relationiste de l'Espace", Revue de Metaphysique et de Morale 23: 423–454. Translated as Hurley, P.J., 1979, "The relational theory of space", Philosophy Research Archives 5: 712–741.
- ------, 1919. An Enquiry Concerning the Principles of Natural Knowledge. Cambridge Univ. Press. 2nd ed., 1925.
- ------, 1920. The Concept of Nature. Cambridge Univ. Press. 2004 paperback, Prometheus Books. Being the 1919 Tarner Lectures delivered at Trinity College, Cambridge.
- ------, 1978 (1929). Process and Reality. Free Press.
- Woodger, J. H., 1937. The Axiomatic Method in Biology. Cambridge Univ. Press.
