= Mereological essentialism =

Thesis in philosophy that a whole ceases to exist if it loses a part

In philosophy, mereological essentialism is a mereological thesis about the relationship between wholes, their parts, and the conditions of their persistence. According to mereological essentialism, objects have their parts necessarily. If an object were to lose or gain a part, it would no longer be the original object.

== Definitions ==
Mereological essentialism is typically taken to be a thesis about concrete material objects, but it may also be applied to abstract objects, such as a set or proposition. If mereological essentialism is correct, a proposition, or thought, has its parts essentially; in other words, it has ontological commitments to all its conceptual components.

=== Endurantism and Perdurantism ===
The two prominent, competing material models of mereological essentialism are endurantism and perdurantism. Neither endurantism nor perdurantism imply mereological essentialism. One may advocate for either model without being committed to accepting mereological essentialism. Within an endurantist framework, objects are extended within space; they are collections of spatial parts. Objects persist through change (endure) by being wholly present at every instant of time. According to mereological essentialism, enduring objects have only their spatial parts essentially. Within a perdurantist framework, objects are extended through space-time; they have parts in both space and time. Under a framework that combines mereological essentialism and perdurantism, objects have both their temporal parts and spatial parts essentially.

=== Essentiality ===
Essentiality can be explained by referencing necessity and/or possible worlds. Mereological essentialism is then the thesis that objects have their parts necessarily or objects have their parts in every possible world in which the object exists. In other words, an object X composed of two parts a and b ceases to exist if it loses either part. Additionally, X ceases to exist if it gains a new part, c.

== Examples ==
Mereological essentialism is a position defended in the debate regarding material constitution.

For instance, several answers have been proposed regarding the question: "What is the relationship between a statue and the lump of clay from which it is made?" Coincidentalism is the view that the statue and the lump of clay are two objects located at the same place. The lump of clay should be distinguished from the statue because they have different persistence conditions. The lump would not survive the loss of a bit of clay, but the statue would. The statue would not survive being squashed into a ball, but the lump of clay would.

== Defenders ==
The following philosophers have thought mereological essentialism to be true:

Pre-20th century: Peter Abelard; Gottfried Leibniz

20th century: G.E. Moore; Roderick Chisholm; James Van Cleve

21st century: Michael Jubien; Mark Heller

Chisholm and van Cleve consider objects as enduring. Michael Jubien and Mark Heller defend mereological essentialism for perduring objects.

== Arguments for ==
There are several arguments for mereological essentialism. Some are more formal; others use mereological essentialism as a solution to various philosophical puzzles or paradoxes. (This approach is mentioned in Olson (2006).)

=== The argument from bad alternatives ===
What would be the opposite of mereological essentialism? It would be that objects would survive the loss of any part. We can call this mereological inessentialism. But mereological inessentialism means that a table would survive replacement or loss of any of its parts. By successive replacement we could change the parts of the table so in the end it would look like a chair. This is the Ship of Theseus paradox. Because it is difficult to justify a clearly defined point at which the table is destroyed and replaced by the chair, the best solution to this puzzle may be mereological essentialism (Chisholm 1973).

=== "Deon and Theon" argument ===
Imagine a person called Deon. He has a proper part, his foot. One day he loses his foot. The resulting entity is then known as Theon. But it seems that Theon existed when Deon existed by being a proper part of Deon. Did Deon survive? If he did, then Deon and Theon must be identical. But Theon is a proper part of Deon. This is paradoxical.

One way to solve this puzzle is to deny that Deon has any proper parts. Defending this view is rejecting the principle of arbitrary undetached parts (Van Inwagen 1981). It means that a cup in front of you doesn't have a left part, a right part, a part where the ear of the cup is or a part where the coffee is stored (if the hole of the cup is a part of the cup).

=== A world made only of stuff ===
Some philosophers reject the existence of individual objects, or simples. According to such authors, the world does not contain single, individualizable objects which we can use logic to quantify. Instead the world only contains stuff, or masses of matter which come in different quantities. We have for instance a gram of gold. There is a grammatical difference between stuff and things. It would not make sense to say, "take a gold," but instead we must specify a lump of gold (Simons 1987). Standard methods of quantification are methods of invoking thinghood on the world; it is then argued that if the world is made only of stuff, mereological essentialism must be true.

The argument from a world made only of stuff was first noted by van Cleve (1986). Defenders of a stuff ontology are Michael Jubien (1993) and Mark Heller (1990).

== Arguments against ==
Because mereology is a new branch of formal systems, clear arguments against mereological essentialism have not yet been raised. The most common counterargument is that mereological essentialism entails that an object which undergoes a subtle change is not the same object. This seems to be directly contrary to common sense. For example, if my car gets a flat tire and I then replace the tire, mereological essentialism entails that it is not the same car.

=== The argument from a paradigmatic example ===
The most common argument against mereological essentialism is the view that it cannot be universally true. Take us, for example. As humans, which are living organisms, we survive by having our parts replaced by metabolic processes or even organ transplantation. We might have our hair or fingernails cut. All of these procedures do not seem to cause the nonexistence of the person or, for that matter, the nonexistence of any living organism. Therefore, mereological essentialism cannot be universally true (Plantinga 1975).

This argument may fail if the mereological essentialist believes in presentism, that the present is the only relevantly true world. This view is a response to the problem of Qualitative Change.

== See also ==
- Mereological nihilism
- Meronymy and holonymy
- Peter van Inwagen
- Temporal parts
- Ship of Theseus
