= Gunk (mereology) =

Philosophical term

In mereology, an area of metaphysics, the term gunk applies to any whole whose parts all have further proper parts. That is, a gunky object is not made of indivisible atoms or simples. Because parthood is transitive, any part of gunk is itself gunk. The term was first used by David Lewis in his work Parts of Classes (1991), in which he conceived of the possibility of "atomless gunk", which was shortened to "gunk" by later writers. Dean W. Zimmerman defends the possibility of atomless gunk.

If point-sized objects are always simple, then a gunky object does not have any point-sized parts, and may be best described by an approach such as Whitehead's point-free geometry. By usual accounts of gunk, such as Alfred Tarski's in 1929, three-dimensional gunky objects also do not have other degenerate parts shaped like one-dimensional curves or two-dimensional surfaces.

Gunk is an important test case for accounts of the composition of material objects: for instance, Ted Sider has challenged Peter van Inwagen's account of composition because it is inconsistent with the possibility of gunk. Sider's argument also applies to a simpler view than van Inwagen's: mereological nihilism, the view that only material simples exist. If nihilism is necessarily true, then gunk is impossible. But, as Sider argues, because gunk is both conceivable and possible, nihilism is false, or at best a contingent truth.

Gunk has also played an important role in the history of topology in recent debates concerning change, contact, and the structure of physical space. The composition of space and the composition of material objects are related by receptacles—regions of space that could harbour a material object. (The term receptacles was coined by Richard Cartwright.) It seems reasonable to assume that if space is gunky, a receptacle is gunky and then a material object is possibly gunky.

== History ==
Arguably, discussions of material gunk run all the way back to at least Aristotle and possibly as far back as Anaxagoras, and include such thinkers as William of Ockham, René Descartes, and Alfred Tarski. However, the first contemporary mentionings of gunk is found in the writings of A. N. Whitehead and Bertrand Russell, and later in the writings of David Lewis. Elements of gunk thought are present in Zeno's famous paradoxes of plurality. Zeno argued that if there were such things as discrete instants of time, then objects can never move through time. Aristotle's solution to Zeno's paradoxes involves the idea that time is not made out of durationless instants, but ever smaller temporal intervals. Every interval of time can be divided into smaller and smaller intervals, without ever terminating in some privileged set of durationless instants. In other words, motion is possible because time is gunky. Despite having been a relatively common position in metaphysics, after Cantor's discovery of the distinction between denumerable and non-denumerable infinite cardinalities, and mathematical work by Adolf Grünbaum, gunk theory was no longer seen as a necessary alternative to a topology of space made out of points. Recent mathematical work in the topology of spacetime by scholars such as Peter Roeper and Frank Arntzenius have reopened the question of whether a gunky spacetime is a feasible framework for doing physics.

Possibly the most influential formulation of a theory of gunky spacetime comes from A. N. Whitehead in his seminal work Process and Reality. Whitehead argues that there are no point regions of space and that every region of space has some three-dimensional extension. Under a Whiteheadian conception of spacetime, points, lines, planes, and other less-than-three-dimensional objects are constructed out of a method of "extensive abstraction", in which points, lines, and planes are identified with infinitely converging abstract sets of nested extended regions.

== Incompossible with mereological nihilism ==
Ted Sider has argued that even the possibility of gunk undermines another position, that of mereological nihilism. Sider's argument is as follows:

1. Nihilism is either necessarily true, or necessarily false.
2. Gunk is metaphysically possible.
3. If gunk is metaphysically possible, then nihilism is not necessarily true.
4. Therefore, nihilism is necessarily false.

This argument only depends on whether or not gunk is even possible, not whether or not the actual world is a gunky one. Sider defends premise #1 by appealing to the fact that since nihilism is a metaphysical thesis, it must be true or false of necessity. In defense of premise #2, Sider argues that since a gunk world is conceivable; that is, we can imagine a gunky world without any internal contradiction, the gunk must be possible. Premise #3 follows from an understanding of necessity and possibility that stems from an understanding of possible world semantics. Simply put, a proposition P is necessarily false if and only if it is false in all possible worlds, and if a proposition P is possible, it is true in at least one possible world. Thus, if a proposition is possible, then it is not necessarily false, as it is not false in all possible worlds. The conclusion, #4, follows deductively from the other premises.

Sider's argument is valid, so most strategies to resist the argument have focused on denying one or more of his premises. Strategies that deny #1 have been called the "contingency defense". Deniers of #1 say that the facts that determine the composition of objects are not necessary facts, but can differ in different possible worlds. As such, nihilism is a contingent matter of fact, and the possibility of gunk does not undermine the possibility of nihilism. This is the strategy endorsed by Cameron and Miller.

Alternatively, one could deny #2 and say that gunk is metaphysically impossible. Most strategies that take this route deny #2 in virtue of denying another relatively common intuition: that conceivability entails metaphysical possibility. Although this metaphysical principle dates back to at least the works of Descartes, recent work by philosophers such as Marcus and Roca-Royes has shed some doubt on the reliability of conceivability as a guide to metaphysical possibility. Furthermore, Sider's own arguments in defense of #1 seem to undermine the argument: gunk is also a metaphysical thesis, thus, it seems that (like #1) it would also have to be either necessarily true or necessarily false. The argument would only work if gunk were necessarily true, but this would amount to question-begging.

== See also ==
- Mereology
- Mereological nihilism
- Mereological essentialism
- Perdurantism
- Endurantism
- Mereotopology
