= Trenton Merricks =

American philosopher

Trenton Merricks (/ˈmɛrɪks/) is an American philosopher and the Commonwealth Professor of Philosophy at the University of Virginia. While Merricks' primary field of study is metaphysics, he has also published scholarship in epistemology, philosophy of language, and philosophy of religion.

== Education and academic postings ==
Merricks attended Ohio State University as an undergraduate and received his doctorate in philosophy the University of Notre Dame under the supervision of the well-known Christian philosopher Alvin Plantinga. Before holding his professorship at the University of Virginia, Merricks served as an assistant professor and then an associate professor at Virginia Commonwealth University.

== Philosophical scholarship ==
Merricks's published articles include "Truth and Freedom" (Philosophical Review), "Endurance and Indiscernibility" (Journal of Philosophy), "On the Incompatibility of Enduring and Perduring Objects" (Mind), "Persistence, Parts, and Presentism" (Nous), "There are No Criteria of Identity Over Time" (Nous), "Warrant Entails Truth" (Philosophy and Phenomenological Research), "Varieties of Vagueness" (Philosophy and Phenomenological Research), and "Composition and Vagueness" (Mind).

He has also authored and published four books:

- Objects and Persons (Oxford University Press, 2001)
- Truth and Ontology (Oxford University Press, 2007)
- Propositions (Oxford University Press, 2015)
- Self and Identity (Oxford University Press, 2022)

== See also ==
- Mereological nihilism
- Philosophy of religion
- Growing block universe
- Personal identity
