= Meronomy =

Hierarchy that deals with part–whole relationships

A meronomy is a hierarchical taxonomy that deals with part–whole relationships. For example, a car has parts that include engine, body and wheels; and the body has parts that include doors and windows.

These conceptual structures are used in linguistics and computer science, with applications in biology. The part–whole relationship is sometimes referred to as HAS-A, and corresponds to object composition in object-oriented programming.

The study of meronomy is known as mereology, and in linguistics a meronym is the name given to a constituent part of, a substance of, or a member of something. "X" is a meronym of "Y" if an X is a part of a Y. The unit of organisation that corresponds to the taxonomical taxon is the meron.

== Example ==
- Cars have parts: engine, headlight, wheel
  - Engines have parts: crankcase, carburetor
  - Headlights have parts: headlight bulb, reflector
  - Wheels have parts: rim, spokes, tires

== In knowledge representation ==
In formal terms, in the context of knowledge representation and ontologies, a meronomy is a partial order of concept types by the part–whole relation.

In the classic study of parts and wholes, mereology, the three defining properties of a partial order serve as axioms. They are, respectively, that the part-of relation is:

- Transitive – "Parts of parts are parts of the whole" (If A is part of B and B is part of C, then A is part of C);
- Reflexive – "Everything is part of itself" (A is part of A); and
- Antisymmetric – "Nothing is a part of its parts" (If A is part of B and A ≠ B, then B is not part of A).

Meronomies may be represented in semantic web languages such as OWL and SKOS. In natural languages they are represented by meronyms and holonyms.

== See also ==
- Mereology
- Meronymy
