= Simple (philosophy) =

Philosophical concept

In contemporary mereology, a simple or indivisible monomere (in mereology, not in chemistry) is any thing that has no proper parts. Sometimes the term "atom" is used, although in recent years the term "simple" has become the standard.

Simples are to be contrasted with atomless gunk (where something is "gunky" if it is such that every proper part has a further proper part; a potential omnidivisible). Necessarily, given the definitions, everything is either composed of simples, gunk or a mixture of the two. Classical mereology is consistent with both the existence of gunk and either finite or infinite simples (see Hodges and Lewis 1968).

== The Simple Question ==
Mirroring the special composition question is the Simple Question. It asks what the jointly necessary and sufficient conditions are for x to be a mereological simple. In the literature this question explicitly concerns what it is for a material object to lack proper parts, although there is no reason why similar questions cannot be asked of things from other ontological categories.

There have been many suggested answers to the Simple Question. Answers include that x is a simple if and only if it is a point-sized object; that x is a simple if and only if it is indivisible; or that x is a simple if and only if it is maximally continuous. Kris McDaniel has argued that what it is for an object to be a simple is a matter of brute fact, and that there is no non-trivial answer to the Simple Question (2007b).

== Extended simples ==
Of those philosophers who believe the material world contains simples, there has recently been debate over whether there can be extended simples (see Braddon-Mitchell and Miller 2006, Hudson 2006, Markosian 1998, 2004, McDaniel 2007a, 2007b, McKinnon 2003, Parsons 2000, Sider 2006, Simons 2004 inter alia). An extended simple is (i) a material object; (ii) simple, and (iii) it occupies an extended region of space.

Various reasons have been offered in favor of the claim that extended simples are possible, including: (a) that they are conceivable (Markosian 1998), (b) that purportedly plausible modal principles claiming, roughly, that there are no necessary connections between distinct existences entail their possibility (McDaniel 2007a, Saucedo 2009, Sider 2006), and (c) that contemporary physical theories entail that there are extended simples (Braddon-Mitchell and Miller 2006). One might also argue in favor of the possibility of extended simples by noting that their existence is consistent with the answer to the Simple Question one endorses. In the literature, however, the reasoning is often reversed: Those who think that extended simples are possible often use their purported possibility to argue against answers to the Simple Question that entail their impossibility and those who think that they are impossible uses their purported impossibility to argue against answers to the Simple Question that entail (or strongly suggest) their possibility.

There have been arguments against extended simples. Arguments include variants on Lewis' argument from temporary intrinsics, as well as arguments that intuitively an extended object must have, for instance, a right half and a left half, and thus have parts (cf Zimmerman 1996: 10) Similarly, one who endorses the Doctrine of Arbitrarily Undetatched Parts, which states that necessarily, if an object occupies region R then every occupiable proper sub-region of R is exactly occupied by a proper part of that object (see van Inwagen 1981), might use that principle in an argument against the possibility of extended simples.

If there are no extended simples, the only remaining options would material objects being made of unextended simples (objects that have a space-time extension of 0) or atomless gunk.

Some philosophers seem to have held that the whole universe is one enormous extended simple. According to some interpretations of Descartes and Spinoza, for instance, they held this view. More recently, this view has been defended in Schaffer 2007.

== Non-material simples ==
The use of 'simple' is not restricted to material objects. Anything, no matter what ontological category it is from, is a simple if and only if it has no proper parts. Thus Lewis has argued that singletons are simples (Lewis 1991) and spacetime points are often thought to be simples (although in some non-standard spacetimes, points have proper parts). Similarly, there is a question of whether things from other categories – for instance, fictional characters and properties, if there are such things – are simples. Furthermore, just as every material object may be made of atomless gunk rather than simples, so too for objects from other ontological categories. For instance, some have held that spacetime is gunky, claiming that every region of spacetime has a proper sub-region.

== See also ==
- Atomism
- Gunk
- Mereology
- Mereological essentialism
- Mereological nihilism
- Monad
- Simple (abstract algebra)
