= Sortal =

Concept in philosophy

In metaphysics, a sortal is a type of general term used in discussions of identity, persistence, and change. Sortals are typically expressed by common nouns, especially count nouns, or by noun phrases headed by count nouns. This is based on the claim that a perceptual link allows perceptual demonstrative thought if it enables sortal classification.

== Overview ==
The simplest property of a sortal is that it can be counted, i.e., can take numbers as modifiers. It can also be used with a definite or indefinite article. For example, "pea" is a sortal in the sentence "I want two peas", whereas "water" is not a sortal in the sentence "I want water". It cannot be applied to an object that does not permit arbitrary division. Countability is not the only criterion. Thus "red thing" in the sentence "There are two red things on the shelf" is not treated as a sortal by some philosophers who use the term. There is disagreement about the exact definition of the term as well as whether it is applied to linguistic things (such as predicates or words), abstract entities (such as properties or concepts), or psychological entities (such as states of mind).

== Differing perspectives ==
According to the Stanford Encyclopedia of Philosophy, the sortal/nonsortal distinction can be characterized in at least six different ways. It is said that a sortal:

- gives a criterion for counting the items of that kind
- gives a criterion of identity and non-identity among items of that kind
- gives a criterion for the continued existence of an item of that kind
- answers the question "what is it?" for things of that kind
- specifies the essence of things of that kind
- does not apply to parts of things of that kind

== History ==
While some philosophers have argued that the notion of a sortal is similar to the idea of a "secondary substance" in Aristotle, the first actual use of the term 'sortal' did not appear until John Locke in his 1690 Essay Concerning Human Understanding:

But it being evident, that things are ranked under Names into sorts or Species…the Essence of each Genus, or Sort, comes to be nothing but that abstract Idea, which the General, or Sortal (if I may have leave so to call it, from Sort, as I do General from Genus) Name stands for. And this we shall find to be that, which the word Essence imports, in its most familiar use.

— Locke, Bk. III, Ch. III, 15

Gottlob Frege is also named as an antecedent to the present debate over sortals. Frege pointed out that in counting things, we need to know what kind of thing it is that we are counting; that is, there needs to be a "criterion of identity".

In contemporary philosophy, sortals make a return with the work of P. F. Strawson, W. V. O. Quine, Peter Geach, and David Wiggins. Strawson holds that sortals are universals (calling them "sortal universals"), Quine thinks they are predicates, and Wiggins sees them as concepts (and distinguishes them from "dummy sortals" such as thing and object, which do not themselves supply criteria of identity). Geach did not use the exact term "sortal"; however, his idea of the "substantival expression" is identical or nearly so to that of "sortal". According to him, identity is relative in a sortal concept, which he described as one that answers the question "Same what?".

Wilfrid Sellars uses sortals in his analysis of language about universals, treating expressions such as triangularity as metalinguistic distributive singular terms.

== See also ==
- Taxonomy
