= Identity of indiscernibles =

Impossibility for separate objects to have all their properties in common

The identity of indiscernibles is an ontological principle that states that there cannot be separate objects or entities that have all their properties in common. That is, entities x and y are identical if every predicate possessed by x is also possessed by y and vice versa. It states that no two distinct things (such as snowflakes) can be exactly alike, but this is intended as a metaphysical principle rather than one of natural science. A related principle is the indiscernibility of identicals, discussed below.

A form of the principle is attributed to the German philosopher Gottfried Wilhelm Leibniz. While some think that Leibniz's version of the principle is meant to be only the indiscernibility of identicals, others have interpreted it as the conjunction of the identity of indiscernibles and the indiscernibility of identicals (the converse principle). Because of its association with Leibniz, the indiscernibility of identicals is sometimes known as Leibniz's law. It is considered to be one of his great metaphysical principles, the other being the principle of noncontradiction and the principle of sufficient reason (famously used in his disputes with Newton and Clarke in the Leibniz–Clarke correspondence).

Some philosophers have decided, however, that it is important to exclude certain predicates (or purported predicates) from the principle in order to avoid either triviality or contradiction. An example (detailed below) is the predicate that denotes whether an object is equal to x (often considered a valid predicate). As a consequence, there are a few different versions of the principle in the philosophical literature, of varying logical strength—and some of them are termed "the strong principle" or "the weak principle" by particular authors, in order to distinguish between them.

The identity of indiscernibles has been used to motivate notions of noncontextuality within quantum mechanics.

Associated with this principle is also the question as to whether it is a logical principle, or merely an empirical principle.

== Identity and indiscernibility ==
Both identity and indiscernibility are expressed by the word "same". Identity is about numerical sameness, and is expressed by the equality sign ("="). It is the relation each object bears only to itself. Indiscernibility, on the other hand, concerns qualitative sameness: two objects are indiscernible if they have all their properties in common. Formally, this can be expressed as "$\forall F(Fx \leftrightarrow Fy)$". The two senses of sameness are linked by two principles: the principle of indiscernibility of identicals and the principle of identity of indiscernibles. The principle of indiscernibility of identicals is uncontroversial and states that if two entities are identical with each other then they have the same properties. The principle of identity of indiscernibles, on the other hand, is more controversial in making the converse claim that if two entities have the same properties then they must be identical. This entails that "no two distinct things exactly resemble each other". On this principle, for any two different items there must be some discriminable or distinguishable difference, at least in principle, between the two items because were there no difference, they would not be two but rather one. Note that these are all second-order expressions. Neither of these principles can be expressed in first-order logic (are nonfirstorderizable). Formally, the two principles can be expressed in the following way:

- The indiscernibility of identicals: $\forall x \, \forall y \, [x=y \rightarrow \forall F(Fx \leftrightarrow Fy)]$
  For any $x$ and $y$, if $x$ is identical to $y$, then $x$ and $y$ have all the same properties.
- The identity of indiscernibles: $\forall x \, \forall y \, [\forall F(Fx \leftrightarrow Fy) \rightarrow x=y]$
  For any $x$ and $y$, if $x$ and $y$ have all the same properties, then $x$ is identical to $y$.

The indiscernibility of identicals is usually taken to be uncontroversially true, whereas the identity of indiscernibles is more controversial, having been famously disputed by Max Black.

The conjunction of these two principles is sometimes called "Leibniz's Law", although this name has sometimes been used for either of the two other principles, or for other principles. It may be stated as a biconditional:

- Biconditional "Leibniz's Law": $\forall x \, \forall y \, [x=y \leftrightarrow \forall F(Fx \leftrightarrow Fy)]$
  For any $x$ and $y$, it is true that $x$ is identical to $y$ if, and only if, $x$ and $y$ have all the same properties.

Some logicians have regarded this principle as essential to identity and equality: Alfred Tarski listed it among the logical axioms governing the notion of identity, and Rudolf Carnap defined the equals sign for identity (=) in terms of this biconditional.

In a universe of two distinct objects A and B, all predicates F are materially equivalent to one of the following properties:

- IsA, the property that holds of A but not of B;
- IsB, the property that holds of B but not of A;
- IsAorB, the property that holds of both A and B;
- IsNotAorB, the property that holds of neither A nor B.

If ∀F applies to all such predicates, then the second principle as formulated above reduces trivially and uncontroversially to a logical tautology. In that case, the objects are distinguished by IsA, IsB, and all predicates that are materially equivalent to either of these. This argument can combinatorially be extended to universes containing any number of distinct objects.

Proof box

Abbreviations:
IndscID:	∀x,y.	(x = y → ∀F (Fx⇔Fy))
IDIndsc:	∀x,y.	(∀F (Fx⇔Fy) → x = y)
Refl:	∀x.	x = x
Symm:	∀x,y.	(x = y → y = x)
Trans:	∀x,y,z.	(x = y ∧ y = z → x = z)

IndscID ∧ Refl → Symm
Proof:
Given x, y such that x = y,
define F(v) as v = x, then
	x = x	by Refl
→	Fx	by Def. of F
→	Fy	by IndscID, since x = y
→	y = x	by Def. of F

IndscID ∧ Refl → Trans
Proof:
Given x, y, z such that x = y and y = z,
define F(v) as v = z, then
	y = z	assumed
→	Fy	by Def. of F
→	Fx	by IndscID, since y = x (from x = y and Symm, see above)
→	x = z	by Def. of F

IDIndsc → Refl
Proof:
For any F and any x, Fx ⇔ Fx; hence
x = x by IDIndsc

IndscID ⇸ Refl
Counterexample:
When used as '=',
the empty relation satisfies IndscID,
but not Refl.

The equality relation expressed by the sign "=" is an equivalence relation in being reflexive (everything is equal to itself), symmetric (if x is equal to y then y is equal to x) and transitive (if x is equal to y and y is equal to z then x is equal to z). The indiscernibility of identicals and identity of indiscernables can jointly be used to define the equality relation. The symmetry and transitivity of equality follow from the first principle, whereas reflexivity follows from the second. Both principles can be combined into a single axiom by using a biconditional operator ($\leftrightarrow$) in place of material implication ($\rightarrow$).

== Indiscernibility and conceptions of properties ==
Indiscernibility is usually defined in terms of shared properties: two objects are indiscernible if they have all their properties in common. The plausibility and strength of the principle of identity of indiscernibles depend on the conception of properties used to define indiscernibility.

One important distinction in this regard is between pure and impure properties. Impure properties are properties that, unlike pure properties, involve reference to a particular substance in their definition. So, for example, being a wife is a pure property while being the wife of Socrates is an impure property due to the reference to the particular "Socrates". Sometimes, the terms qualitative and non-qualitative are used instead of pure and impure. Discernibility is usually defined in terms of pure properties only. The reason for this is that taking impure properties into consideration would result in the principle being trivially true since any entity has the impure property of being identical to itself, which it does not share with any other entity.

Another important distinction concerns the difference between intrinsic and extrinsic properties. A property is extrinsic to an object if having this property depends on other objects (with or without reference to particular objects), otherwise it is intrinsic. For example, the property of being an aunt is extrinsic while the property of having a mass of 60 kg is intrinsic. If the identity of indiscernibles is defined only in terms of intrinsic pure properties, one cannot regard two books lying on a table as distinct when they are intrinsically identical. But if extrinsic and impure properties are also taken into consideration, the same books become distinct so long as they are discernible through the latter properties.

== Critique ==
=== Symmetric universe ===
Max Black has argued against the identity of indiscernibles by counterexample. Notice that to show that the identity of indiscernibles is false, it is sufficient that one provide a model in which there are two distinct (numerically nonidentical) things that have all the same properties. He claimed that in a symmetric universe wherein only two symmetrical spheres exist, the two spheres are two distinct objects even though they have all their properties in common.

Black argues that even relational properties (properties specifying distances between objects in space-time) fail to distinguish two identical objects in a symmetrical universe. Per his argument, two objects are, and will remain, equidistant from the universe's plane of symmetry and each other. Even bringing in an external observer to label the two spheres distinctly does not solve the problem, because it violates the symmetry of the universe.

=== Indiscernibility of identicals ===
As stated above, the principle of indiscernibility of identicals—that if two objects are in fact one and the same, they have all the same properties—is mostly uncontroversial. However, one famous application of the indiscernibility of identicals was by René Descartes in his Meditations on First Philosophy. Descartes concluded that he could not doubt the existence of himself (the famous cogito argument), but that he could doubt the existence of his body.

This argument is criticized by some modern philosophers on the grounds that it allegedly derives a conclusion about what is true from a premise about what people know. What people know or believe about an entity, they argue, is not really a characteristic of that entity. A response may be that the argument in the Meditations on First Philosophy is that the inability of Descartes to doubt the existence of his mind is part of his mind's essence. One may then argue that identical things should have identical essences.

Consider the following reductio ad absurdum based on a secret identity:

1. Entities x and y are identical if and only if any predicate possessed by x is also possessed by y and vice versa.
2. Clark Kent is Superman's secret identity; that is, they're the same person (identical) but people don't know this fact.
3. Lois Lane thinks that Clark Kent cannot fly.
4. Lois Lane thinks that Superman can fly.
5. Therefore Superman has a property that Clark Kent does not have, namely that Lois Lane thinks that he can fly.
6. Therefore, Superman is not identical to Clark Kent.

Since in proposition 6 we come to a contradiction with proposition 2, we conclude that at least one of the premises is wrong. Either:

1. Leibniz's law is wrong; or
2. A person's knowledge about x is not a predicate of x; or
3. The application of Leibniz's law is erroneous; the law is only applicable in cases of monadic, not polyadic, properties; or
4. What people think about are not the actual objects themselves; or
5. A person is capable of holding conflicting beliefs.

Any of which will undermine Descartes' argument.

== See also ==
- 1st axiom of a metric
- Disquotational principle – Philosophical assertion about rational thought
- Duck test – Classification based on observable evidence
- Indistinguishable particles – Concept in quantum mechanics of perfectly substitutable particles, a similar idea
- Identity (philosophy) – Relation each thing bears to itself alone
- Masked-man fallacy – Formal fallacy about knowledge of objects, a fallacious use of this principle
- Ship of Theseus – Thought experiment about identity over time
- Structural type system – Class of type systems, a similar idea in computer science
- Type–token distinction – Distinguishing objects and classes of objects
- First-order logic § Equality and its axioms
