= Mereological nihilism =

Ontological thesis

In philosophy, mereological nihilism (also called compositional nihilism) is the metaphysical thesis that there are no objects with proper parts. Equivalently, mereological nihilism says that mereological simples, or objects without any proper parts, are the only material objects that exist. Mereological nihilism is a form of nihilism as it denies a metaphysical assumption about reality, that is, the existence of composite objects.

== Explanation ==
The everyday perceptual experience of conscious beings suggests that there exist macrophysical objects that have other, smaller objects as their proper parts. For example, there appear to be such objects as tables, which appear to be composed of various other objects, such as the table-legs, a flat surface, and perhaps the nails or bolts holding those pieces together. Those latter objects, in turn, appear to be composed of still smaller objects, and so on. Indeed, every putative material object one's perceptual faculties are capable of representing appears to be composed of smaller parts.

Mereological nihilists claim that there are no composite material objects. According to mereological nihilism, there are only fundamental physical simples arranged in various spatial patterns. For example, the mereological nihilist claims that, despite appearances to the contrary, there really are no tables. There are only fundamental physical simples spatially arranged and causally interrelated in such a way as to jointly cause one's perceptual faculties to have table-like perceptual experiences. Nihilists often abbreviate claims like this one as follows: there are fundamental physical simples arranged table-wise. Ted Sider argued in a 2013 article that one ought to think of composition as arrangement. According to Sider, when one says "there is a table", they mean there are mereological simples arranged table-wise.

== Discussion ==
Mereological nihilism entails the denial of what is called classical mereology, which is succinctly defined by philosopher Achille Varzi:

Mereology (from the Greek μερος, 'part') is the theory of parthood relations: of the relations of part to whole and the relations of part to part within a whole. Its roots can be traced back to the early days of philosophy, beginning with the Presocratic atomists and continuing throughout the writings of Plato (especially the Parmenides and the Theaetetus), Aristotle (especially the Metaphysics, but also the Physics, the Topics, and De partibus animalium), and Boethius (especially In Ciceronis Topica).

As can be seen from Varzi's passage, classical mereology depends on the idea that there are metaphysical relations that connect part(s) to whole. Mereological nihilists maintain that such relations between part and whole do not exist.

Nihilists typically claim that our senses give us the (false) impression that there are composite material objects, and then attempt to explain why nonetheless our thought and talk about such objects is 'close enough' to the truth to be innocuous and reasonable in most conversational contexts. Sider's linguistic revision that reformulates the existence of composite objects as merely the existence of arrangements of mereological simples is an example of this. Tallant (2013) has argued against this maneuver. Tallant has argued that mereological nihilism is committed to answering the following question: when is it that a group of mereological simples is arranged in a particular way? What relations must maintain among a group of mereological simples such that they are arranged table-wise? It seems the nihilist can determine when a group of objects compose another object: for them, never. But the nihilist, if committed to Sider's view, is committed to answering how mereological simples can be arranged in particular ways.

=== Objections ===
The objection that can be raised against nihilism is that it seems to posit the existence of far fewer objects than we typically think exist. The nihilist's ontology has been criticized for being too sparse, as it only includes mereological simples, and denies the existence of composite objects that we intuitively take to exist, like tables, planets, and animals. Another challenge that nihilists face arises when composition is examined in the context of contemporary physics. According to findings in quantum physics, there are multiple kinds of decomposition in different physical contexts. For example, there is no single decomposition of light; light can be said to be either composed of particles or waves depending on the context. This empirical perspective poses a problem for nihilism because it does not seem like all material objects perfectly decompose to mereological simples. In addition, some philosophers have speculated that there may not be a "bottom level" of reality. Atoms used to be understood as the most fundamental material objects, but were later discovered to be composed of subatomic particles and quarks. It is then possible that the most fundamental entities of current physics can actually be decomposed further than what is currently considered their base form, and their parts can be further decomposed. If matter is infinitely decomposable in this respect, then mereological simples do not exist as an absolute entity. This poses a conflict with an initial assumption within Mereological Nihilism according to the belief that only mereological simples exist.

=== Partial vs. pure nihilism ===
Philosophers in favor of something close to pure mereological nihilism include Peter Unger, Cian Dorr, and Ross Cameron. There are a few philosophers who argue for what could be considered a partial nihilism, or what has been called quasi-nihilism, which is the position that only objects of a certain kind have parts. One such position is organicism: the view that living beings exist, but there are no other objects with parts, and all other objects that we believe to be composite—chairs, planets, etc.—therefore do not exist. Rather, other than living beings, which are composites (objects that have parts), there are only true atoms, or basic building blocks (which they call simples). Organicist philosophers include Trenton Merricks and Peter van Inwagen.

==== Van Inwagen's view ====
Peter Van Inwagen maintains that all material objects are mereological simples with the exception of biological life such that the only composite objects are living things. Van Inwagen's view can be formulated like this: "Necessarily, for any non-overlapping xs, there is an object composed of the xs if either (i) the activities of the xs constitute a life or (ii) there is only one of the xs." In other words, Van Inwagen contends that mereological atoms form a composite object when they engage in a sort of special, complex activity which amounts to a life.

One reason why Van Inwagen's solution to the Special Composition Question is so attractive is that it allows us to account a conscious subject as a composite object. Nihilists have to maintain that the subject of a single consciousness is somehow the product of many discrete mereological atoms. Van Inwagen's argument against nihilism can be characterized as such:

1. I exist
2. I am not a mereological simple
3. At least one object exists that is not a mereological simple
4. So, nihilism is false

In addition to allowing for the existence of trees, cats, and human beings, Van Inwagen's view is attractive because it inherits nihilism's elegant solutions to traditional problems in mereology like the Ship of Theseus and the problem of the many.

One objection that can be offered against Van Inwagen's view is the vagueness of the category of life and the ambiguity of when something gets "caught up" in a life. For example, if a cat takes a breath and inhales a carbon atom, it is unclear at what point that atom becomes officially incorporated into the cat's body.

Even though there are no tables or chairs, Van Inwagen thinks that it is still permissible to assert sentences such as 'there are tables'. This is because such a sentence can be paraphrased as 'there are simples arranged tablewise'; it is appropriate to assert it when there are simples arranged a certain way. It is a common mistake to hold that Van Inwagen's view is that tables are identical to simples arranged tablewise. This is not his view: Van Inwagen would reject the claim that tables are identical to simples arranged tablewise because he rejects the claim that composition is identity. Nonetheless, he maintains that an ordinary speaker who asserts, for instance, "There are four chairs in that room" will speak truly if there are, indeed, simples in the room arranged in the appropriate way (so as to make up, in the ordinary view, four chairs). He claims that the statement and its paraphrase "describe the same fact". Van Inwagen suggests an analogy with the motion of the sun: an ordinary speaker who asserts that "the sun has moved behind the elms" will still speak truly, even though we accept the Copernican claim that this is not, strictly speaking, literally true. (For details, see his book "Material Beings").

== See also ==
- Acosmism
- Buddhist atomism
- Divine simplicity
- Elementary particles
- Madhyamaka
- Mereological essentialism
- Metaphysical nihilism
- Nihilism
- Peter van Inwagen
- Presentism
- Reductionism
- Simples
- Trenton Merricks
