= Perdurantism =

Philosophical theory of persistence

Perdurantism or perdurance theory is a philosophical theory of persistence and identity. In metaphysics the debate over persistence currently involves three competing theories—one three-dimensionalist theory called "endurantism" and two four-dimensionalist theories called "perdurantism" and "exdurantism". For a perdurantist, all objects are considered to be four-dimensional "worms" that make up the different regions of spacetime. It is a fusion of all the perdurant's instantaneous time slices compiled and blended into a complete mereological whole. Perdurantism posits that temporal parts alone are what ultimately change. Katherine Hawley in How Things Persist states that change is "the possession of different properties by different temporal parts of an object".

Take any perdurant and isolate a part of its spatial region. That isolated spatial part has a corresponding temporal part to match it. We can imagine an object, or four-dimensional worm: an apple. This object is not just spatially extended but temporally extended. The complete view of the apple includes its coming to be from the blossom, its development, and its final decay. Each of these stages is a temporal time slice of the apple, but by viewing an object as temporally extended, perdurantism views the object in its entirety.

The use of "endure" and "perdure" to distinguish two ways in which an object can be thought to persist can be traced to David Kellogg Lewis (1986). However, contemporary debate has demonstrated the difficulties in defining perdurantism (and also endurantism). For instance, the work of Ted Sider (2001) has suggested that even enduring objects can have temporal parts, and it is more accurate to define perdurantism as being the claim that objects have a temporal part at every instant that they exist. Currently, there is no universally acknowledged definition of perdurantism. (Note: See also: McKinnon (2002) and Merricks (1999)) Others argue that this problem is avoided by creating time as a continuous function, rather than a discrete one.

Perdurantism is also referred to as "four-dimensionalism" (by Ted Sider, in particular), but perdurantism also applies if one believes there are temporal but non-spatial abstract entities (like immaterial souls or universals of the sort accepted by David Malet Armstrong).

== Subgroups ==
Four-dimensionalist theorists break into two distinct sub-groups: worm theorists and stage theorists.

=== Worm theorists ===
Worm theorists believe that a persisting object is composed of the various temporal parts that it has. It can be said that objects that persist are extended through the time dimension of the block universe much as physical objects are extended in space. Thus, they believe that all persisting objects are four-dimensional "worms" that stretch across space-time, and that you are mistaken in believing that chairs, mountains, and people are simply three-dimensional.

=== Stage theorists ===
Stage theorists take discussion of persisting objects to be talk of a particular temporal part, or stage, of an object at any given time. So, in a manner of speaking, a subject only exists for an instantaneous period of time. However, there are other temporal parts at other times which that subject is related to in a certain way (Sider talks of "modal counterpart relations", whilst Hawley talks of "non-Humean relations") such that when someone says that they were a child, or that they will be an elderly person, these things are true, because they bear a special "identity-like" relation to a temporal part that is a child (that exists in the past) or a temporal part that is an elderly person (that exists in the future). Stage theorists are sometimes called "exdurantists".

Exdurantism, like perdurantism, is commonly associated with the temporal ontology of eternalism. However, this is not always the case; one can be an endurantist and an eternalist, or a perdurantist and a growing block theorist. There have even been cases of a-theorists of time identifying as eternalists, such as Tim Maudlin. With this alternative four-dimensionalist persistence theory, however, ordinary objects are no longer perduring worms but, rather, are wholly present instantaneous stages. Moreover, things also do not gain or lose properties/parts because each distinct stage has all these properties/parts in their entirety from one counterpart stage to the next.

It has been argued that stage theory should be favoured over worm theory as more accurately accounting for the contents of our experience. Worm theory seems to require that we currently experience more than a single moment of our lives; that we actually find ourselves experiencing only one instant of time is argued to be more in line with the stage view. Contemporary perdurantists disagree, arguing that the "worm" is a fusion of all the perdurant’s instantaneous time slices compiled and blended into a mereological whole. Perdurantism, then, does not require that you experience more than one time slice at any given time, but instead argues that all those moments are a part of reality, and comprise you as a whole.

== Comparison to exdurantism ==
Recently, it has been argued that perdurantism is superior to exdurantism because exdurantism is too extravagant in counting ordinary objects in the world. That is, if each momentary stage of a persisting object's existence is to be counted as a unique object, the practically interminable number of these stages would make counting objects in the world an unreasonable task. An exdurantist claims a continuant to hold the same identity simply from this stage’s being similar to a subsequent stage, which is what makes the two stages temporal counterparts. Resemblance amongst momentary counterpart stages is insufficient to escape vagueness because similarity itself is vague. Similar in what way? By noting when there is a similarity amongst sortals and that there are adequate causal relations held between them, exdurantists avoid vagueness the best they can. Counterpart theorists follow the identity of a continuant from following the relationship among stages. The problem still lies that there is no clear cutoff point concerning what was and what was not a counterpart of the object and whether we can really attribute a causal relationship between the distinct momentary counterpart object-stages.

For an exdurantist, there are as many objects as there are moments in a continuant’s spacetime career, i.e., there are as many objects as there are stages of a continuant’s existence; e.g., with a continuant like an apple, there are as many distinct objects as there are stages in the span of the apple’s spacetime career, which is an enormous number. Perdurantists and endurantists both think there is only one object—one continuant—that persists, while exdurantists think that there is one continuant but a multiplicity of object-stages that exdure. However, Joshua Stuchlik states that the stage theory will not work under the possibility of gunky time, which states that for every interval of time, there is a sub-interval. Zimmerman (1996), there have been many self-professed perdurantists who believe that time is gunky or contains no instants. Daniel Giberman offered a defence for how stage theory could exist in a gunky world. Some perdurantists think the idea of gunk means there are no instants, since they define these as intervals of time with no subintervals.

== See also ==
- Counterpart theory
- World line
- Ship of Theseus
- Gunk (mereology)

== Bibliography ==
- Balashov, Y. 2015. “Experiencing the Present”. Epistemology & Philosophy of Science 44 (2): 61-73.
- Callais, R. 2021. "Persistence as a Four-Dimensionalist: Perdurantism vs. Exdurantism", Dialogue, 64 (1): 24-29.
- Lewis, D.K. 1986. On the Plurality of Worlds. Oxford: Blackwell.
- Maudlin, T. 2007. The Metaphysics Within Physics Oxford: Oxford University Press.
- McKinnon, N. 2002 The Endurance/Perdurance Distinction", The Australasian Journal of Philosophy 80 (3): 288-306.
- Merricks, T. 1999. "Persistence, Parts and Presentism ", Noûs 33: 421-38.
- Parsons, J. 2015. “A phenomenological argument for stage theory”. Analysis 75 (2): 237-242
- Sider, T. 2001. Four-Dimensionalism. Oxford: Clarendon Press.
- Sider, T. 1996.“All the World's a Stage”, Australasian Journal of Philosophy 74 (3): 433-453.
- Skow, B. 2011. “Experience and the Passage of Time”. Philosophical Perspectives 25 (1): 359-387.
- Zimmerman, D. 1996. “Persistence and Presentism”, Philosophical Papers 25: 2.
