= Endurantism =

Philosophical theory

Endurantism or endurance theory is a philosophical theory of persistence and identity. According to the endurantist view, material objects are persisting three-dimensional individuals wholly present at every moment of their existence, which goes with an A-theory of time. This conception of an individual as always present is opposed to perdurantism or four-dimensionalism, which maintains that an object is a series of temporal parts or stages, requiring a B-theory of time. The use of "endure" and "perdure" to distinguish two ways in which an object can be thought to persist can be traced to David Lewis.

One serious problem of endurantism is the problem of temporary intrinsics raised by David Lewis. Lewis claims that intrinsic properties of objects would change over time. Thus, endurantism cannot harmonize identity with change and then cannot explain persistence clearly even if endurantists appeal to intrinsic properties. Endurantists may argue that intrinsic properties are related to time. However, this would produce another problem. If intrinsic properties are related to others, they are not intrinsic property (see intrinsic and extrinsic properties). Therefore, Perdurantism is a better position of persistence (see prominent arguments in favor of four-dimensionalism).

However, some philosophers, such as Sally Haslanger, find a way to resolve this problem as Lewis's perdurantism does. Haslanger claims that Lewis's perdurantist solution is not the only solution, and endurantism can resolve this problem as well. She believes that Lewis's way does not directly answer the problem that objects that persist can change their intrinsic properties; he just finds a way to bypass it—the perdurer is not an object that keeps intrinsic properties unchanged over time (see identity and change). Similarly, endurantism could find a way to bypass this problem and to reconcile the persistence of objects and intrinsic properties. Her method is in virtue of adverbial modification. According to this method, a sentence that objects have properties is related to time, but the time modifies ‘have’ rather than objects or properties. A person, for example, had-at-t1 bentness and had-at-t2 straightness. It seems like that objects can at different times through different ways obtain properties. After such treatment, objects that exist can through different ways at different times instantiate different intrinsic properties (these properties are not related to time directly). Through this method, endurantism can resolve the problem of temporary intrinsic as Lewis's method does.

== See also ==
- Alfred North Whitehead
- A-series and B-series
- Counterpart theory
- David Lewis
- Essentialism
- J. J. C. Smart
- Open individualism
- Philosophy of time
- Vertiginous question
