= Identity (philosophy) =

Relation each thing bears to itself alone

In metaphysics, identity (from Latin: identitas, "sameness") is the relation each thing bears only to itself. The notion of identity gives rise to many philosophical problems, including the identity of indiscernibles (if x and y share all their properties, are they one and the same thing?), and questions about change and personal identity over time (what has to be the case for a person x at one time and a person y at a later time to be one and the same person?). It is important to distinguish between qualitative identity and numerical identity. For example, consider two children with identical bicycles engaged in a race while their mother is watching. The two children have the same bicycle in one sense (qualitative identity) and the same mother in another sense (numerical identity). This article is mainly concerned with numerical identity, which is the stricter notion.

The philosophical concept of identity is distinct from the better-known notion of identity in use in psychology and the social sciences. The philosophical concept concerns a relation, specifically, a relation that x and y stand in if, and only if they are one and the same thing, or identical to each other (i.e. if, and only if x = y). The sociological notion of identity, by contrast, has to do with a person's self-conception, social presentation, and more generally, the aspects of a person that make them unique, or qualitatively different from others (e.g. cultural identity, gender identity, national identity, online identity, and processes of identity formation). Recently, identity has been conceptualized in relation to humans’ position within the ecological web of life; this combination of sociocultural and ecological identification is known as ecocultural identity.

== Metaphysics of identity ==
Metaphysicians and philosophers of language and mind ask other questions:

- What does it mean for an object to be the same as itself?
- If x and y are identical (are the same thing), must they always be identical? Are they necessarily identical?
- What does it mean for an object to be the same, if it changes over time? (Is apple_{t} the same as apple_{t+1}?)
- If an object's parts are entirely replaced over time, as in the Ship of Theseus example, in what way is it the same?

The law of identity used to be referred to as a "law of thought". The modern formulation of identity is that of Gottfried Leibniz, who held that x is the same as y if and only if every predicate true of x is true of y as well.

Leibniz's ideas have taken root in the philosophy of mathematics, where they have influenced the development of the predicate calculus as Leibniz's law. Mathematicians sometimes distinguish identity from equality. More mundanely, an identity in mathematics may be an equation that holds true for all values of a variable. Hegel argued that things are inherently self-contradictory and that the notion of something being self-identical only made sense if it were not also not-identical or different from itself and did not also imply the latter. In Hegel's words, "Identity is the identity of identity and non-identity." More recent metaphysicians have discussed trans-world identity—the notion that there can be the same object in different possible worlds. An alternative to trans-world identity is the counterpart relation in counterpart theory. It is a similarity relation that rejects trans-world individuals and instead defends an object's counterpart—the most similar object.

Some philosophers have denied that there is such a relation as identity. Thus Ludwig Wittgenstein writes (Tractatus 5.5301): "That identity is not a relation between objects is obvious." At 5.5303 he elaborates: "Roughly speaking: to say of two things that they are identical is nonsense, and to say of one thing that it is identical with itself is to say nothing." Bertrand Russell had earlier voiced a worry that seems to be motivating Wittgenstein's point (The Principles of Mathematics §64): "[I]dentity, an objector may urge, cannot be anything at all: two terms plainly are not identical, and one term cannot be, for what is it identical with?" Even before Russell, Gottlob Frege, at the beginning of "On Sense and Reference," expressed a worry with regard to identity as a relation: "Equality gives rise to challenging questions which are not altogether easy to answer. Is it a relation?" More recently, C. J. F. Williams has suggested that identity should be viewed as a second-order relation, rather than a relation between objects, and Kai Wehmeier has argued that appealing to a binary relation that every object bears to itself, and to no others, is both logically unnecessary and metaphysically suspect.

== Identity statements ==
Kind-terms, or sortals, give a criterion of identity and non-identity among items of their kind.

== See also ==
- Counterpart theory
- Difference (philosophy)
- Exact similarity and identity
- Four-dimensionalism/perdurantism
- Open individualism
- Teletransportation paradox
- Type–token distinction
- Vertiginous question
- Nonidentity problem
