= Ship of Theseus =

Thought experiment about identity over time

As the parts of the ship were replaced, the question arose as to whether it was the same ship that Theseus had used.

The Ship of Theseus, also known as Theseus's Paradox, is a paradox and common thought experiment questioning whether an object (in the most common stating of the paradox, a ship) remains the same when all of its original components are gradually replaced over time, with no single part being designated as essential to its original identity.

Greek biographer Plutarch described the paradox in his Life of Theseus, recounting how the Athenians preserved the ship on which the mythical king Theseus had sailed after slaying the Minotaur and rescuing the children of Athens from King Minos. They maintained the ship by removing and replacing rotted timbers, raising philosophical debates on whether or not it remained the same ship. English philosopher Thomas Hobbes, in De Corpore (1655), further questioned how to consider a second ship that had been built entirely from pieces removed from the original.

In contemporary philosophy, the thought experiment has applications to the philosophical study of identity over time. Within the contemporary philosophy of mind, it has inspired a variety of proposed solutions and concepts regarding the persistence of personal identity.

== History ==
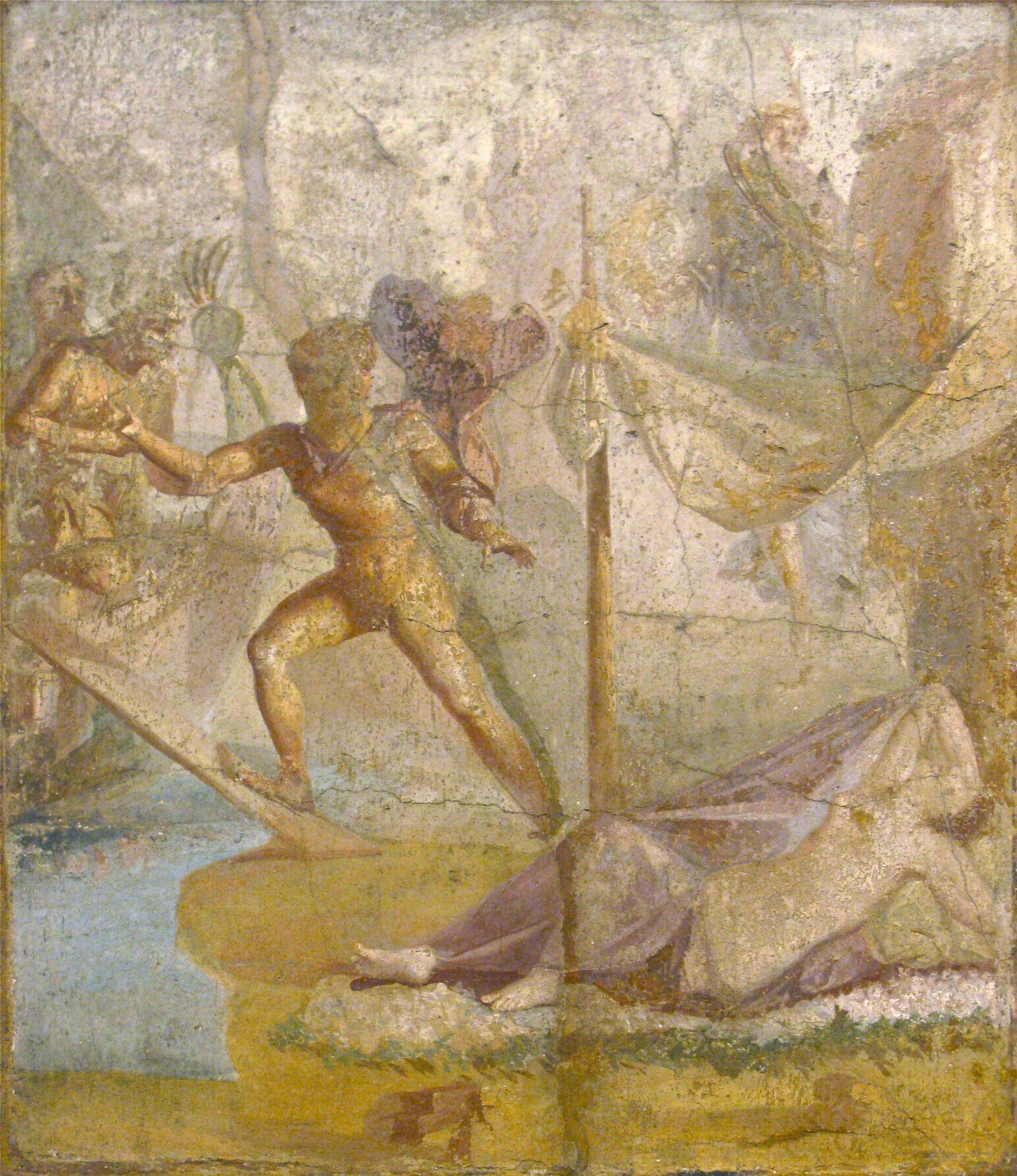
A fresco from Pompeii depicting Theseus and Ariadne escaping from Crete. According to Plutarch, the Athenians preserved the ship that Theseus used to escape by replacing the parts one-by-one as they decayed.

In its original formulation, the "Ship of Theseus" paradox concerns a debate over whether a ship that has had all of its components replaced one-by-one would remain the same ship. The account of the problem has been preserved by Plutarch in his Life of Theseus:

The ship wherein Theseus and the youth of Athens returned from Crete had thirty oars, and was preserved by the Athenians down even to the time of Demetrius Phalereus, for they took away the old planks as they decayed, putting in new and strong timber in their places, insomuch that this ship became a standing example among the philosophers, for the logical question of things that grow; one side holding that the ship remained the same, and the other contending that it was not the same.

— Plutarch, Life of Theseus 23.1

The 17th-century philosopher Thomas Hobbes extended the thought experiment by supposing that a ship custodian gathered up all of the decayed parts as they were discarded and used them to build a second ship, then asked which of the two—the custodian's or the Athenians'—was the "original" ship.

For if that Ship of Theseus (concerning the Difference whereof, made by continual restoration, in taking out the old Planks, and putting in new, the sophisters of Athens were wont to dispute) were, after all the Planks were changed, the same Numerical Ship it was at the beginning; and if some Man had kept the Old Planks as they were taken out, and by putting them afterward together in the same order, had again made a Ship of them, this would, without doubt, had also been the same Numerical Ship with that which was at the beginnings and so there would have been two Ships Numerically the same, which is absurd... But we must consider by what name anything is called when we inquire concerning the Identity of it... so that a Ship, which signifies Matter so figured, will be the same, as long as the Matter remains the same; but if no part of the Matter is the same, then it is Numerically another Ship; and if part of the Matter remains, and part is changed, then the Ship will be partly the same, and partly not the same.

— Hobbes, "Of Identity and Difference"

Hobbes considers the two resulting ships as illustrating two definitions of identity or sameness, form and matter, that are being compared to the original ship:

1. the ship that maintains the same "form" as the original, that which persists through complete replacement of material and;
2. the ship made of the same "matter", that which stops being 100 percent the same ship when the first part is replaced.

== Proposed resolutions ==
The Ship of Theseus paradox can be thought of as an example of a puzzle of material constitution—that is, a problem with determining the relationship between an object and the material of which it is made.

=== Constitution is not identity ===
According to the Stanford Encyclopedia of Philosophy, the most popular solution is to accept the conclusion that the material out of which the ship is made is not the same object as the ship, but that the two objects simply occupy the same space at the same time.

=== Temporal parts ===
Another common theory, put forth by 20th-century American philosopher David Lewis, is to divide up all objects into three-dimensional time slices, which are temporally distinct. This avoids the issue that the two different ships exist in the same space at one time and a different space at another time by considering the objects to be distinct from each other at all points in time.

=== Cognitive science ===
According to other scientists, the thought puzzle arises because of extreme externalism: the assumption that what is true in our minds also holds true in the world. Noam Chomsky says that this is not an unassailable assumption, from the perspective of the natural sciences, because human intuition is often mistaken. Cognitive science would treat this thought puzzle as the subject of an investigation of the human mind. Studying this human confusion can reveal much about the brain's operation, but little about the nature of the human-independent external world.

Following on from this observation, a significant strand in cognitive science would consider the ship not as a thing, nor even a collection of objectively existing thing parts, but rather as an organisational structure that has perceptual continuity.

=== Deflationism ===
According to the Stanford Encyclopedia of Philosophy, the deflationist view is that the facts of the thought experiment are undisputed; the only dispute is over the meaning of the term "ship" and is thus merely verbal. American philosopher Hilary Putnam asserts that "the logical primitives themselves, and in particular the notions of object and existence, have a multitude of different uses rather than one absolute 'meaning'." This thesis—that there are many meanings for the existential quantifier that are equally natural and equally adequate for describing all the facts—is often referred to as "the doctrine of quantifier variance."

=== Continued identity theory ===
This solution (proposed by Kate, Ernest et al.) sees an object as staying the same as long as it continuously and metaphysically exists under the same identity without being fully transformed at one time. For instance, a house that has its front wall destroyed and replaced at Year One, the ceiling replaced at Year Two, and so on, until every part of the house has been replaced will still be understood as the same house. However, if every wall, the floor, and the roof are destroyed and replaced at the same time, it will be regarded as a new house.

== Alternative forms ==
In Western countries, several independent tales and stories feature knives of which the blades and handles had been replaced several times but are still used and represent the same knife. France has Jeannot's knife; Spain uses Jeannot's knife as a proverb, though it is referred to simply as "the family knife"; and Hungary has "Lajos Kossuth's pocket knife". Several variants or alternative statements of the underlying problem are known, including the grandfather's axe, where an old axe has had both its head and its handle replaced, leaving no original components. In an American version, a museum claims to own George Washington's axe, but the axe's handle has been replaced three times and its head twice. In Britain, the term Trigger's broom is sometimes used, in reference to a line from the sitcom Only Fools and Horses in which road sweeper Trigger says that he has used the same broom for 20 years, with it only needing 17 new heads and 14 new handles in that time.

The French critic and essayist Roland Barthes refers at least twice to a ship that is entirely rebuilt, in the preface to his Essais Critiques (1971) and later in his Roland Barthes par Roland Barthes (1975); in the latter, the persistence of the form of the ship is seen as a key structuralist principle. He calls this ship the Argo, on which Theseus was said to have sailed with Jason; he may have confused the Argo (referred to in passing in Plutarch's Theseus at 19.4) with the ship that sailed from Crete (Theseus, 23.1).

The ancient Buddhist text Da zhidu lun contains a similar philosophical puzzle: a story of a traveller who encountered two demons in the night. As one demon ripped off all parts of the traveler's body one by one, the other demon replaced them with those of a corpse, and the traveller was confused about who he was.

== Examples ==
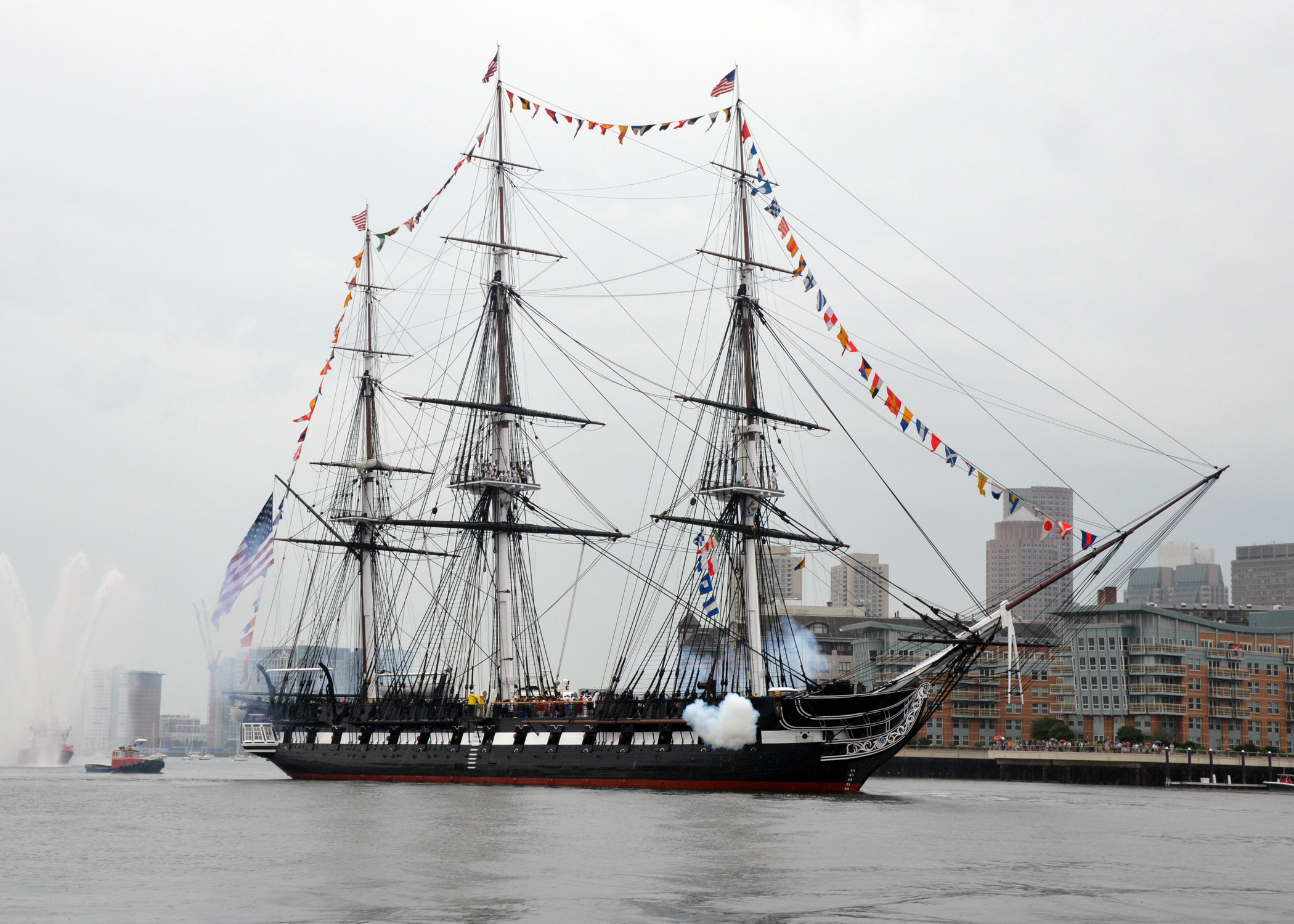
Since only around eight to twenty percent of the ship is original, the USS Constitution is something of a real-life Ship of Theseus.

The wooden-hulled frigate USS Constitution is referenced by the museum's official website as an example of the paradox, with it being thought that as little as eight percent of the 1797 ship may be original. Charles Joseph Bonaparte wrote in a 1905 Navy report that in his view it was "not the vessel with which Hull [had captured] Guerriere." The Antique and Classic Boat Society define a preserved boat as "containing at least 60% of their original deck and topsides material", but in the case of the Constitution they conclude that it "has essentially none of its original wood but we believe no one would consider it a replica. It is Old Ironsides."

The deep-submergence vehicle Alvin is regularly disassembled completely every 3-5 years and parts are inspected and changed. As a result, every component of Alvin has been changed at least once, including the main structure of the hull.

In Japan, the Ise Grand Shrine is rebuilt every twenty years with entirely "new wood". The continuity over the centuries is considered spiritual and comes from the source of the wood, which is harvested from an adjoining forest that is considered sacred.

== See also ==
- Bundle theory – Philosophical theory by David Hume
- Haecceity – Term from medieval scholastic philosophy
- Interchangeable parts – Practically identical components
- Mereological essentialism – Thesis in philosophy that a whole ceases to exist if it loses a part
- Neurath's boat – Philosophical analogy about knowledge
- Perdurantism – Philosophical theory of persistence
- Philosophy of self – Concept in philosophy
- Przekładaniec – 1968 film by Andrzej Wajda
- Sorites paradox – Logical paradox from vague predicates
- Śūnyatā – Philosophical concept of emptiness found in Asian religions
- Swampman – Philosophical thought experiment concerning personal identity
- Teletransportation paradox – Thought experiment on the philosophy of identity

== General and cited references ==
- Blackburn, Simon, ed. (2016). "Ship of Theseus" (Ebook). The Oxford dictionary of philosophy (Third ed.). Oxford: Oxford University Press. ISBN 978-0-19-179955-6. OCLC 945776618.
- Chomsky, Noam (2010). Chomsky Notebook. Columbia University Press. p. 9. ISBN 978-0-231-14475-9.
- Chomsky, Noam (29 January 2009). Massimo Piattelli-Palmarini; Juan Uriagereka; Pello Salaburu (eds.). Of Minds and Language: A Dialogue with Noam Chomsky in the Basque Country. Oxford University Press. p. 382. ISBN 978-0-19-156260-0.
- Grand, Steve (May 2003). Creation: Life and How to Make It. Harvard University Press. ISBN 978-0-674-01113-7.
- Hobbes, Thomas (1656). "Of Identity and Difference". Elements of philosophy: the first section, concerning body. London: R & W Leybourn. pp. 100–101.
- Huang, Jing; Ganeri, Jonardon (2021). "Is this me? A story about personal identity from the Mahāprajñāpāramitopadeśa / Dà zhìdù lùn". British Journal for the History of Philosophy. 29 (5): 739–762. doi:10.1080/09608788.2021.1881881. S2CID 233821050.
- McGilvray, James (25 November 2013). Chomsky: Language, Mind and Politics. Polity. pp. 72–. ISBN 978-0-7456-4990-0.
- Rea, Michael Cannon, ed. (1997). "Introduction". Material Constitution: A Reader. Rowman & Littlefield. ISBN 978-0-8476-8384-0.
- Wasserman, Ryan (2009). "Material Constitution". In Zalta, Edward N. (ed.). Stanford Encyclopedia of Philosophy. ISSN 1095-5054. OCLC 429049174.
