= Philosophical pluralism =

Doctrine of multiplicity in contrast with monism

Pluralism is a term used in philosophy, referring to a worldview of multiplicity, often used in opposition to monism (the view that all is one) or dualism (the view that all is two). The term has different meanings in metaphysics, ontology, epistemology and logic. In metaphysics, it is the view that there are in fact many different substances in nature that constitute reality. In ontology, pluralism refers to different ways, kinds, or modes of being. For example, a topic in ontological pluralism is the comparison of the modes of existence of things like 'humans' and 'cars' with things like 'numbers' and some other concepts as they are used in science.

In epistemology, pluralism is the position that there is not one consistent means of approaching truths about the world, but rather many. Often this is associated with pragmatism, or conceptual, contextual, or cultural relativism. In the philosophy of science it may refer to the acceptance of co-existing scientific paradigms which though accurately describing their relevant domains, are nonetheless incommensurable. In logic, pluralism is the relatively novel view that there is no one correct logic, or alternatively, that there is more than one correct logic. Such as using classical logic in most cases, but using paraconsistent logic to deal with certain paradoxes.

== Metaphysical pluralism ==
Metaphysical pluralism in philosophy is the multiplicity of metaphysical models of the structure and content of reality, both as it appears and as logic dictates that it might be, as is exhibited by the four related models in Plato's Republic and as developed in the contrast between phenomenalism and physicalism. Pluralism is in contrast to the concept of monism in metaphysics, while dualism is a limited form, a pluralism of exactly two models, structures, elements, or concepts. A distinction is made between the metaphysical identification of realms of reality and the more restricted sub-fields of ontological pluralism (that examines what exists in each of these realms) and epistemological pluralism (the methodology for establishing knowledge about these realms).

=== Ancient pluralism ===
In ancient Greece, Empedocles wrote that there were fire, air, water and earth, although he used the word "root" rather than "element" (στοιχεῖον; stoicheion), which appeared later in Plato. From the association (φιλία; philia) and separation (νεῖκος; neikos) of these indestructible and unchangeable root elements, all things came to be in a fullness (πλήρωμα; pleroma) of ratio (λόγος; logos) and proportion (ἀνάλογος; analogos).

Similar to Empedocles, Anaxagoras was another Classical Greek philosopher with links to pluralism. His metaphysical system is centered around mechanically necessitated nous which governs, combines and diffuses the various "roots" of reality (known as homoioneroi). Unlike Empedocles' four "root elements" and similar to Democritus' multitude of atoms (yet not physical in nature), these homoioneroi are used by Anaxagoras to explain the multiplicity in reality and becoming. This pluralist theory of being influenced later thinkers such as Gottfried Wilhelm Leibniz's theory of monads and Julius Bahnsen's idea of will henades. The notion of a governing nous would also be used by Socrates and Plato, but they will assign it a more active and rational role in their philosophical systems.

Aristotle incorporated these elements, but his substance pluralism was not material in essence. His hylomorphic theory allowed him to maintain a reduced set of basic material elements as per the Milesians, while answering for the ever-changing flux of Heraclitus and the unchanging unity of Parmenides. In his Physics, due to the continuum of Zeno's paradoxes, as well as both logical and empirical considerations for natural science, he presented numerous arguments against the atomism of Leucippus and Democritus, who posited a basic duality of void and atoms. The atoms were an infinite variety of irreducibles, of all shapes and sizes, which randomly collide and mechanically hook together in the void, thus providing a reductive account of changeable figure, order and position as aggregates of the unchangeable atoms.

== Ontological pluralism ==
The topic of ontological pluralism discusses different ways, kinds, or modes of being. Recent attention in ontological pluralism is due to the work of Kris McDaniel, who defends ontological pluralism in a number of papers. The name for the doctrine is due to Jason Turner, who, following McDaniel, suggests that "In contemporary guise, it is the doctrine that a logically perspicuous description of reality will use multiple quantifiers which cannot be thought of as ranging over a single domain." "There are numbers, fictional characters, impossible things, and holes. But, we don't think these things all exist in the same sense as cars and human beings."

It is common to refer to a film, novel or otherwise fictitious or virtual narrative as not being 'real'. Thus, the characters in the film or novel are not real, where the 'real world' is the everyday world in which we live. However, some authors may argue that fiction informs our concept of reality, and so has some kind of reality.

One reading of Ludwig Wittgenstein's notion of language-games argues that there is no overarching, single, fundamental ontology, but only a patchwork of overlapping interconnected ontologies ineluctably leading from one to another. For example, Wittgenstein discusses 'number' as technical vocabulary and in more general usage:

""All right: the concept of 'number' is defined for you as the logical sum of these individual interrelated concepts: cardinal numbers, rational numbers, real numbers etc.;" ... — it need not be so. For I can give the concept 'number' rigid limits in this way, that is, use the word 'number' for a rigidly limited concept, but I can also use it so that the extension of the concept is not closed by a frontier. ...Can you give the boundary? No. You can draw one..."

— Ludwig Wittgenstein, excerpt from §68 in Philosophical Investigations

Wittgenstein suggests that it is not possible to identify a single concept underlying all versions of 'number', but that there are many interconnected meanings that transition one to another; vocabulary need not be restricted to technical meanings to be useful, and indeed technical meanings are 'exact' only within some proscribed context.

Eklund has argued that Wittgenstein's conception includes as a special case the technically constructed, largely autonomous, forms of language or linguistic frameworks of Carnap and Carnapian ontological pluralism. He places Carnap's ontological pluralism in the context of other philosophers, such as Eli Hirsch and Hilary Putnam.

== Epistemological pluralism ==
Epistemological pluralism is a term used in philosophy and in other fields of study to refer to different ways of knowing things, different epistemological methodologies for attaining a full description of a particular field. In the philosophy of science epistemological pluralism arose in opposition to reductionism to express the contrary view that at least some natural phenomena cannot be fully explained by a single theory or fully investigated using a single approach.

== Logical pluralism ==
Logical pluralism can be defined a number of ways: the position that there is more than one correct account of logical consequence (or no single, 'correct' account at all), that there is more than one correct set of logical constants or even that the 'correct' logic depends on the relevant logical questions under consideration (a sort of logical instrumentalism). Pluralism about logical consequence says that because different logical systems have different logical consequence relations, there is therefore more than one correct logic. For example, classical logic holds that the argument from explosion is a valid argument, but in Graham Priest's paraconsistent logic—LP, the 'Logic of Paradox'—it is an invalid argument. However, logical monists may respond that a plurality of logical theories does not mean that no single one of the theories is the correct one. After all, there are and have been a multitude of theories in physics, but that hasn't been taken to mean that all of them are correct.

Pluralists of the instrumentalist sort hold that if a logic can be correct at all, it is based on its ability to answer the logical questions under consideration. If one wants to understand vague propositions, one may need a many-valued logic. Or if one wants to know what the truth-value of the Liar Paradox is, a dialetheic paraconsistent logic may be required. Rudolf Carnap held to a version of logical pluralism:

In logic there are no morals. Everyone is at liberty to build his own logic, i.e. his own language, as he wishes. All that is required of him is that, if he wishes to discuss it, he must state his methods clearly, and give syntactical rules instead of philosophical arguments.

— Rudolph Carnap, excerpt from §17 in The Logical Syntax of Language

== See also ==
- Anekantavada
- Legal pluralism
- Panarchism
- Pantheism
- Pluralism in political philosophy
- Pluralism in political theory
- Postmodernism
- Quantifier variance
- Religious pluralism
- Value pluralism
