= Julius Bahnsen =

German philosopher (1830–1881)

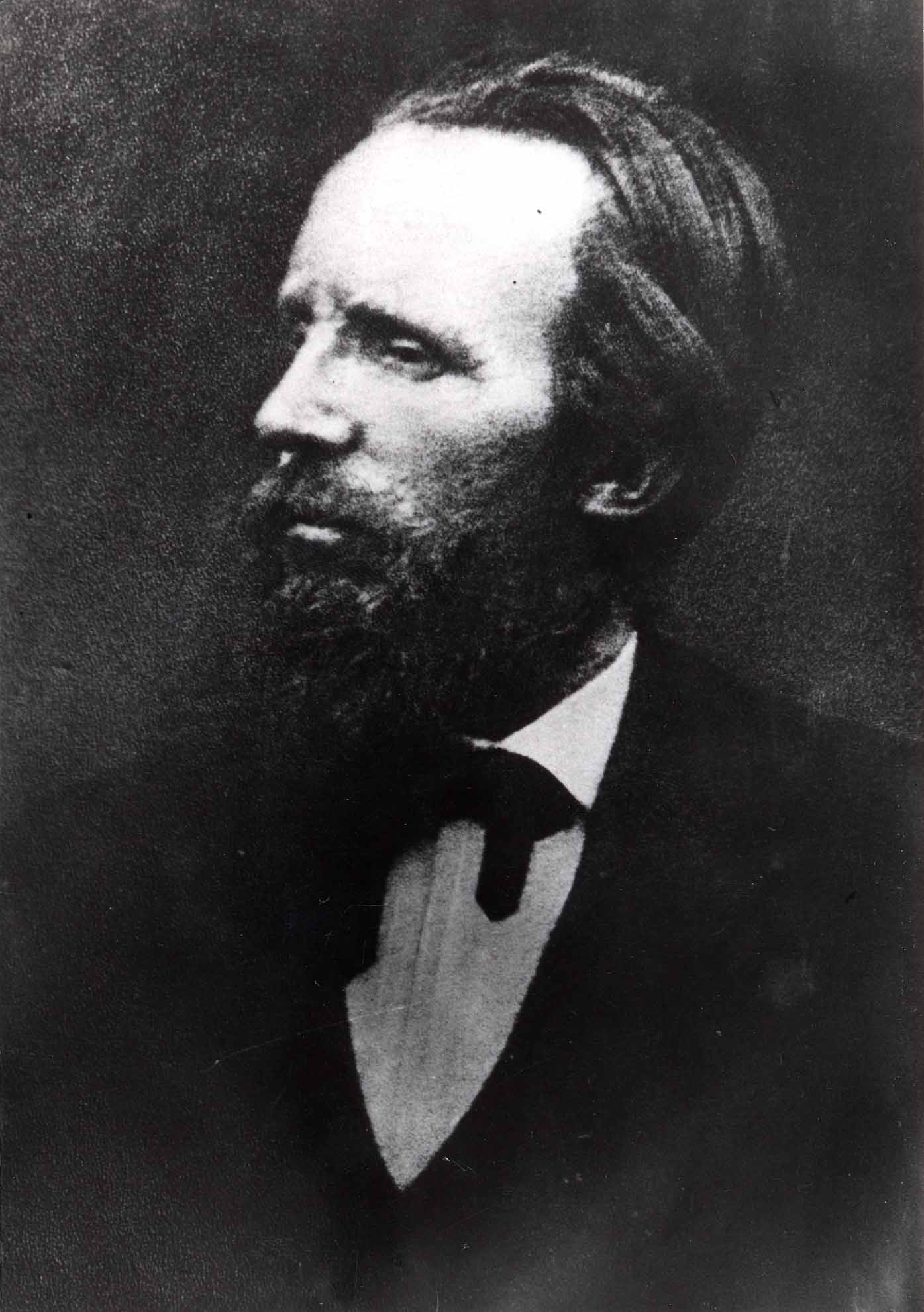
- Born: Julius Friedrich August Bahnsen; 30 March 1830; Tønder, Duchy of Schleswig
- Died: 7 December 1881 (aged 51); Lębork, Province of Pomerania, Kingdom of Prussia

Education
- Education: University of Kiel; University of Tübingen
- Doctoral advisor: Friedrich Theodor Vischer
- Other advisor: Gregor Wilhelm Nitzsch

Philosophical work
- Era: 19th-century philosophy
- Region: Western philosophy
- School: Continental philosophy; Metaphysical voluntarism; Post-Schopenhauerian pessimism; Pluralism; Transcendental realism
- Main interests: Aesthetics; epistemology; metaphysics; psychology; tragedy
- Notable ideas: Realdialektik; The tragic conception of the world

Julius Friedrich August Bahnsen (30 March 1830 – 7 December 1881) was a German philosopher. Bahnsen is usually considered the originator of characterology and a real-dialectical method of philosophical reflection which he laid down in his two-volume Contributions to Characterology (1867) and developed forth with his following works, amongst others his magnum opus The Contradiction in the Knowledge and Being of the World (1880/82).

== Biography ==
Born in Tønder, Schleswig, in 1830 Bahnsen began his study of philosophy and (under Gregor Wilhelm Nitzsch) philology in Kiel. From 1849 he fought as a volunteer against the Danes in the First War of Schleswig (1848–1851) and fled to Tübingen in the Kingdom of Württemberg after the disarming of Schleswig-Holstein's army in 1850. There he studied philosophy and in 1853 graduated under Friedrich Theodor Vischer with a doctoral thesis on aesthetics. Various employments as a teacher followed. In 1862, Bahnsen acquired an employment at a progymnasium in Lauenburg (Lębork), Pomerania, where he lived until his death.

== Philosophical work ==
As a disciple of Schopenhauer, Bahnsen dared a merger of Hegel's dialectic (which Bahnsen, however, accepted only within the realms of the abstract) and Schopenhauer's monism. Though in this connection the reasonless, all-embracing Schopenhauerian will is still accepted as the essence of the world and the only thing real, it doesn't regard the will as being the same within all individuals, but as just as manifold as these individuals.

This characterological element of Bahnsen's teachings, on which the works of such philosophers as Ludwig Klages are built upon, is laid down in the Contributions to Characterology (1867) as well as the disquisitions On the Relationship Between Will and Motive (1870) and Mosaics and Silhouettes (1877). Since the nature of unreasonableness consists in contradiction—particularly the contemporaneous existence of multiple will directions attaching themselves to each other—it follows that not only reality is a continuous struggle of material contrasts (real-dialectic), but that the inside of each individual is addicted to the insolvable antagonism of opposite will directions (will collisions) as well. Bahnsen negates a redemption of the countless will units ("will henades", as he expresses it himself) and postulates the permanence of the existence of the contradiction as a basic nature of the world, whereby the law of this world becomes a tragic world order.

The real-dialectical side of his teachings Bahnsen laid down in the paper On the Philosophy of History (1871), his central work The Contradiction in the Knowledge and Being of the World (1880/82), and his anniversary publication to the jubilee of the city Tübingen The Tragical as World Law and Humour as Aesthetic Shape of the Metaphysical (1877).

=== Philosophy ===
At the beginning of his delve into philosophy, Julius Bahnsen developed an interest in Hegelianism, which was in decline yet still popular in early 19th century Germany. From Hegel's teachings, Bahnsen found his panlogism and radical rationalism dissatisfying. In Bahnsen's view, there was a stark mismatch between the unconcealed irrationality of the world and the naive theories, rationalizations and explanations of various philosophers. Existence itself seemed harsh, confusing and downright contradictory. Starting out from these premises, Bahnsen found Hegel's idea of the dialectic appealing. The dialectic explained the ingrained opposition of the world with itself in a cycle of perpetual conflict (as Heraclitus had observed in his fragments centuries earlier). However, Bahnsen believed that Heraclitus's postulate of an underlying Logos and Hegel's idea of the rational spirit had misled them and had contaminated Hegel's formulation of the dialectic with progressivism and historicism. As a response to this "misunderstanding", Bahnsen developed his own idea of the Realdialektik. In the Realdialektik, there was no notion of synthesis between two opposing forces. The opposition results only in negation and the consequent destruction of contradicting aspects. For Bahnsen, no rationality was to be found in being and thus, there was no teleological power that led to progress at the end of every conflict.

Yet Bahnsen's philosophical system was only taking its very first steps. He accepted a "modified" form of Hegel's dialectic, but by removing the metaphysical driving entity, there remained a void to be filled in his worldview. This led to Bahnsen's accidental discovery of the World as Will and Representation by Arthur Schopenhauer. After carefully examining this magnum opus and discussing it personally with the Frankfurt philosopher, Bahnsen realized that the metaphysical notion of an irrational will underlying all of creation was just what he needed in his own system. After several years of studying Schopenhauer's works, Bahnsen became very proficient and knowledgeable in the "philosophy of will". He was regarded as one of the most capable philosophers in the Schopenhauer Schule, rivalled only by Schopenhauer's personal literary executor — Julius Frauenstädt. However, as Bahnsen's own system matured, he began to deviate from Schopenhauer's teachings in considerable ways.

Bahnsen had always harbored an interest in psychology, specifically the method of examination of individual characters and temperaments. He viewed each person as unique and as a result of this view, could not entirely accept Schopenhauer's preference for monism (the idea that every person and every thing is merely a modus of a singular metaphysical entity). Similar to fellow German pessimist Philipp Mainländer, Bahnsen leaned towards ontological pluralism and asserted that there is no unified will, but only individual wills, with their own specific cravings, aims and wishes. However, these individual wills ("will henades") suffer from contradictory desires due to their irrational nature. This is the result of Bahnsen's combination of Schopenhauer's voluntaristic metaphysic and his own ideas of the Realdialektik. A crucial difference between Schopenhauer's worldview, which offers salvation for some via the freed Intellect's silencing of the will, and that of Bahnsen is that, in Bahnsen's philosophical system — there is no salvation. For Bahnsen, without the will the intellect is impotent. It cannot "will" nothingness, for a will-to-nothingness is still a form of willing, and willing non-willing is a contradiction. Yet it is not impossible for the intellect to have such ideas as, according to Bahnsen, all ideas bred by the intellect are contradictory as the will's desires are irrational and eternally in conflict with themselves. This extremely pessimistic worldview, which offers no escape for the subject, differentiates Bahnsen not only from Schopenhauer, but also from the rest of his pessimistic contemporaries (Frauenstädt, Mainländer, Hartmann). His ideas are arguably more unsettling than Mainländer's notion of a will-to-die, yet strangely similar to Friedrich Nietzsche's idea of the eternal return.

=== Correspondence with Hartmann ===
Bahnsen developed a close friendship with fellow philosopher Karl Robert Eduard von Hartmann, until they eventually fell out and became philosophical rivals. This is not surprising, as both thinkers had similar philosophical beginnings and influences, yet differed crucially in their interpretation of these influences. Hartmann placed Schopenhauer's idea of an ever-desiring will within the unconscious psyche of the subject, while accepting Hegel's underlying rationalism and historicism. Hartmann had an affinity for pantheist monism, and asserted that the will and the rational spirit were ultimately one and the same. In contrast, Bahnsen rejected Hegel's rationalism and accepted his dialectic in a negative form, while integrating it with a pluralized version of Schopenhauer's metaphysics of will. This is a rather ironic demonstration of Bahnsen's idea of existence as contradiction, as Bahnsen and Hartmann's interest in both philosophers both drew them together and created contention within their friendship.

Hartmann criticized Bahnsen's pluralism and claimed that the common point between all "individual wills" is a singular will. Whilst Bahnsen criticized Hartmann, claiming that his "Hegelian rationalism" corrupted the teachings of Schopenhauer's essentially purposeless will. Hegel's spirit could not be combined with the Schopenhauerian will, Bahnsen asserted, because this geist is teleological and has always had an end-goal. The will has no goals for that would require rationality and Schopenhauer was clear that the intellect was only an accidental slave to the will, and not an essential feature to it. Hartmann defended himself by claiming that the will itself was irrational and precisely because of this, it needed the spirit to direct it towards a goal. Otherwise, creation could not have occurred. The representations we observe are the will's only goals and these representations are evidently rational. Bahnsen countered that feeling is the will's non-representational goal and that not all of the will's aims are rational. This debate could not be resolved, as Hartmann regarded feeling as an unconscious representation, while Bahnsen could not bring himself to accept the unprovable reality of this so-called "unconscious representation".

Additionally, Bahnsen disagreed with Hartmann on fundamental points. If the will and the (rational) ideas are different (as Hartmann claimed), how do the Ideas influence the Will at all if they don't have a will of their own? Hartmann would claim that they are "different, yet unified", staying true to his monism. Yet, this would appear as a contradiction to Bahnsen and would further solidify the power of Bahnsen's own convictions and conclusions stemming from his Realdialektik. As for Hartmann, he did not accept Bahnsen's theories and diagnosed him with a psychopathic melancholy and a philosophical inability to distinguish "conflict" from "contradiction".

=== Theory of tragedy ===
Bahnsen's theory of tragedy derived directly and naturally from the contradictory ideas of his Realdialektik. In his own time, the acclaimed theories of tragedy were those of Schiller and Hegel. For them, the correct moral choice in a tragic hero's circumstances is always clear and extremely painful, precisely because of these circumstances. i.e. no matter how clear this choice is, it is always difficult to choose it. A good example is Hegel, who claims that we must always choose the good of the collective, regardless of how difficult this would be for the particular individual. Bahnsen disagreed with such a notion. For him, a clear choice is never obvious; there's not even a clear choice to be had. In tragedy, the hero must choose between his duties and/or his values. Whatever he chooses, he will sin and be punished for not choosing the other (punished either by law or by guilt). From this observation, Bahnsen concluded that tragedy exposes precisely this inner contradiction that is inherent in the world. In his 2016 work Weltschmerz: Pessimism in German Philosophy, 1860-1900 the American professor of philosophy Frederick C. Beiser expresses Bahnsen's theory of tragedy as follows:

The very heart of tragedy, for Bahnsen, consists in two fundamental facts: first, that the individual has to choose between conflicting duties or incommensurable values; and second, that he or she will be punished, or have to suffer, because he or she obeys one duty or honours one value at the expense of another. ... Because duties and values conflict, and because the tragic hero or heroine must act on some duty or value in a particular situation, he or she has no choice but to sin; they must violate another duty or disregard another basic value; and for that infraction or transgression they must be punished. The essence of a tragedy, then, is that we must do the right or act for the good, but that we will also be punished for it because we cannot help violating other duties and goods. Even with the best intentions and the most scrupulous conscience, we end up doing something bad and wrong, for which we must pay.

This is why Bahnsen claims that ultimately, reason cannot help us in our lives and that our choices must be dictated by feeling. A few years before Nietzsche developed his perspectivism and Kierkegaard wrote that all choices lead to sorrow and regret, Bahnsen had already foreseen these conclusions. He complained that a typical Christian missionary would claim that one should just "do the right thing and be rewarded", yet there is not one "right" thing. Each moral choice has consequences and all of them have both advantages and disadvantages. In the face of such a dire existence, Bahnsen views humour as almost sacred. It alone gives us the ability to "laugh off" the tragedy of being and to avoid the clutches of depression.

=== Transcendental realism ===
During the end of his life, Bahnsen completed his philosophical project. Despite constant editions and slight changes in details, three principle premises remained throughout Bahnsen's philosophy:

1) Contradiction exists in the heart of reality, and is not a mere attribute of our thoughts about reality

2) Contradiction does not get resolved in synthesis

3) The source of contradiction is the will

Other than rejecting Hegel's progressivism and reinterpreting Schopenhauer's singular will, Bahnsen also denied all forms of idealism. For him, the ideas of idealism are inherently solipsistic and do not take into consideration the unique reality of the individual wills of other people. For this reason and for other more technical purposes, Bahnsen agreed with his fellow pessimists Julius Frauenstädt, Philipp Mainländer and Karl Robert Eduard von Hartmann that transcendental realism is superior to transcendental idealism.

=== Bahnsen's interpretation of pessimism ===
At the end of his life, Bahnsen wrote an article on pessimism, attempting to distinguish his own pessimism from that of his contemporaries. According to this article, Bahnsen found his position to be opposed to idealistic optimism and deprecating cynicism. He stated that the pessimist preserves his "idealist heart" but utilizes the "cold calculation of the head" to strike a middle ground. Thus, the pessimist realizes that alleviating the suffering of all (even of one) is next to impossible, yet the grief caused by this impossibility strengthens the pessimist's tireless pursuit of this goal, instead of demoralizing him/her. Because he feels the "weltschmerz" of being, he is fueled even further by empathy and compassion.

Bahnsen was critical of "hedonistic" pessimism — the position that the pains of the world outnumber its pleasures in quality and quantity. Once more, the philosopher reasserted his convictions regarding individualism and claimed that such a calculus was impossible to make, as it would measure each individual differently. There are other reasons to be pessimistic about the world, he claimed: To realize that all moral aims and ideals are futile, yet to pursue them nonetheless, knowing full well that there is no exit or salvation — that is true pessimism.
