= Characterology =

Academic study of character

Characterology (from Ancient Greek χαρακτήρ 'character' and ‑λογία, ‑logia) is the academic study of character which was prominent in German-speaking countries during the late 19th and early 20th centuries. It is considered a historic branch of personality psychology, which extended into psychoanalysis and sociology.

The name dates from 1867, having been introduced by the German philosopher Julius Bahnsen, though the discipline itself dates back to classical antiquity. In German psychology, the term character was often used in place of personality. As such, characterology was the study of personality, its development, and its differences between individuals. The term personality however, which was dominant in English use, came to be preferred after the end of World War II.

In the 1920s, the term characterology was appropriated by American writer Leander Hamilton McCormick to promote a physiognomical and phrenological pseudoscience. McCormick's views have further been regarded as scientific racism.

== List of notable characterological psychologists ==
- Alfred Adler
- Julius Bahnsen
- Sigmund Freud
- Erich Fromm
- Carl Jung
- Ludwig Klages
- Ernst Kretschmer
- Wilhelm Reich

== See also ==
- Lebensphilosophie
- Personality development
- Personality judgment
- Personology (disambiguation)
- Physiognomy
- Pseudoscience
- Psychological typologies
- Science in Germany
