= Jody Azzouni =

American philosopher

- Born: Jawad Azzouni; 1954 (age 71–72)
- Occupations: Philosopher, poet

Education
- Education: New York University (BA, 1976; MA, 1978; MSc, 1983); City University of New York (PhD, 1986)
- Doctoral advisor: Arnold Koslow

Philosophical work
- Era: Contemporary philosophy
- Region: Western philosophy
- School: Analytic
- Institutions: Tufts University
- Main interests: Metaphysics, meta-ontology, epistemology, philosophy of mathematics
- Notable ideas: Quantifier neutralism, object projectivism

Jody Azzouni (born Jawad Azzouni, 1954) is an American philosopher, poet, and writer. He is currently a professor of philosophy at Tufts University.

== Education ==
He received his bachelor's and master's degrees in philosophy and a master's degree in mathematics from New York University and his PhD in philosophy from the City University of New York.

== Philosophical work ==
Azzouni is currently working on the philosophy of mathematics, science, logic, language and in areas of metaphysics, meta-ontology, epistemology, and philosophy of mathematics. He is of the nominalist school of thought and has centered much of his philosophical efforts around defending nominalism.

== Books ==
=== Monographs ===
- Metaphysical Myths, Mathematical Practice: The Ontology and Epistemology of the Exact Sciences Cambridge University Press, 1994.
- Knowledge and Reference in Empirical Science, Routledge, 2000.
- Deflating Existential Consequence: A Case for Nominalism Oxford University Press, 2004
- Tracking Reason: Proof, Consequence and Truth. Oxford University Press, 2005.
- Talking About Nothing: Numbers, Hallucinations and Fictions. Oxford University Press, 2010.
- Semantic perception: how the illusion of a common language arises and persists. Oxford University Press, 2013.
- Ontology without Borders. Oxford University Press, 2017.
- The Rule-Following Paradox and its Implications for Metaphysics. Synthese Library Book. 2017
- Attributing Knowledge: What It Means to Know Something. Oxford University Press, 2020.

=== Poetry collections ===
Azzouni has published two collections of poetry with The Poets Press:

- The Lust for Blueprints, 1999 (rev. 2001)
- Hereafter Landscapes, 2010 (rev. 2019)
