= Walter Armstrong =

Walter Armstrong may refer to:

- Sir Walter Armstrong (art historian) (1850–1918), British art historian and writer
- Wally Armstrong (born 1945) American professional golfer
- Walter Sinnott-Armstrong (born 1955), American philosopher
