= Just asking questions =

Pseudoskeptical tactic

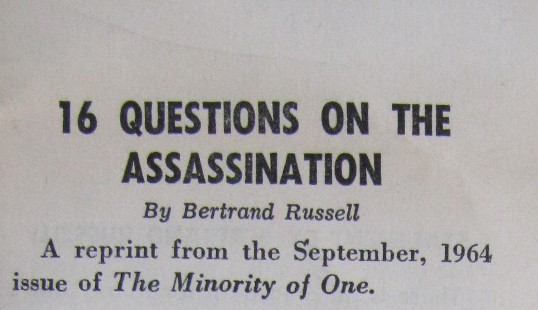
A pamphlet of Bertrand Russell's 1964 essay "16 Questions on the Assassination," which promoted conspiracy theories regarding the assassination of John F. Kennedy.

"Just asking questions" (JAQ; known derisively as "JAQing off") (Note: JAQing Off is a play on words which blends the acronym JAQ with the slang term jacking off; i.e. masturbation.) is a pseudoskeptical tactic often used by conspiracy theorists to present false or distorted claims by framing them as questions. If criticized, the proponents of such a claim may then defend themselves by asserting they were merely asking questions which may upset the mainstream consensus. The name of the tactic is therefore derived from the typical response of "I'm not saying it was necessarily a conspiracy; I'm just asking questions." In The Skeptics' Guide to the Universe, Steven Novella distinguishes JAQ from scientific skepticism by explaining that:

[W]hen true scientists ask a question, they want an answer and will give due consideration to any possibilities. Deniers, on the other hand, will ask the same undermining questions over and over, long after they have been definitively answered. The questions—used to cast doubt—are all they are interested in, not the process of discovery they're meant to inspire.

An early usage of the tactic can be found in Bertrand Russell's essay 16 Questions on the Assassination, which insinuated that American president John F. Kennedy was assassinated by someone other than Lee Harvey Oswald. JAQ as a tactic to justify pseudoarcheological claims was popularized by the Swiss author Erich von Däniken and the American TV show Ancient Aliens, and became further prevalent with the rise of the internet.

== See also ==
- Sealioning
- Socratic method
