= Metaphysical grounding =

Metaphysical dependence relation between facts or entities

Metaphysical grounding is a relation of metaphysical dependence that aims to capture how certain facts or entities obtain “in virtue of” others. It is commonly regarded as a non-causal, explanatory connection between less fundamental and more fundamental elements of reality. Grounding has become a central topic in contemporary analytic philosophy, particularly in discussions of metaphysics, modality, ontology, and the philosophy of explanation. Proponents of grounding argue that it provides a unifying framework for understanding metaphysical structure, including the hierarchy of being, the nature of truthmaking, and the relationship between higher-level and lower-level properties.

To understand what is meant by grounding, consider an ordinary physical object, such as a table, and the atoms it is made of. Without the atoms, the table would not exist; thus, the table's existence depends on the existence of the atoms. This kind of dependence is called grounding to distinguish it from other kinds of dependence, such as the dependence of an effect on its cause. It is sometimes called metaphysical or ontological dependence.

In its paradigmatic form, grounding is used to express claims like: “The fact that the rose is red is grounded in the fact that it reflects light at approximately 700 nanometers,” or “The existence of a set is grounded in the existence of its members.” These are not claims about causation—grounding is taken to be atemporal and non-empirical—but about what metaphysically explains or determines other facts. Take the example of the grounds of natural classification. Here, John Stuart Mill wrote, “In so far as a natural classification is grounded on real kinds, its groups are certainly not conventional; it is perfectly true that they do not depend upon an arbitrary choice of the naturalist."

Grounding is typically described as a form of determination that is finer-grained than logical entailment and supervenience: it is possible for two propositions to be necessarily coextensive while differing in their grounds.

The modern resurgence of interest in grounding was catalyzed by the work of Gideon Rosen, Kit Fine, and Jonathan Schaffer in the early 21st century. These philosophers positioned grounding as central to understanding a wide array of metaphysical issues, from the status of moral and mental properties to debates about fundamentality and reduction. For example, Rosen characterizes grounding as a primitive relation that expresses the metaphysical analogue of explanation, while Schaffer contends that the proper subject matter of metaphysics is not what exists, but what “grounds” what.

Despite its growing prominence, grounding remains controversial. Some philosophers, such as Jessica Wilson, have challenged its coherence and explanatory utility. Others, like Karen Bennett, advocate for a pluralist framework that includes grounding as one among many “building relations.” The ongoing debate has produced a rich literature on the logic, metaphysics, and semantics of grounding, with increasingly fine-grained distinctions between competing theories.

== Core concept and motivation ==
=== Dependence “in virtue of” ===
The central idea of metaphysical grounding is that certain facts or entities obtain in virtue of others. In such cases, the grounded depends for its existence, truth, or status on the ground in a way that is metaphysically prior and explanatory. Grounding is commonly treated as a relation between facts or propositions, though some philosophers extend it to include objects, properties, or other entities. This relation is said to capture a distinctive kind of metaphysical dependence—one that is neither causal nor merely nomological, but constitutive and explanatory in character.

A distinction is typically made between grounding relations and other dependence relations, such as causation or realization. Grounding is often considered to be a form of non-causal determination or priority. Things which are less fundamental are grounded in things that are more fundamental.

As another example, consider the property of being either even or prime. The number 4 has this property because it is even. Here "because" does not express a causal relation (where the cause precedes the effect in time). It expresses a grounding relation. The fact that the number 4 is even or prime is grounded in the fact that 4 is even. In other words, the first fact obtains in virtue of the second fact.

=== Distinction from causation and supervenience ===
Grounding is generally distinguished from causal dependence. Causation is typically understood as a temporally asymmetric, empirically discoverable relation between events; grounding, by contrast, is taken to be atemporal and non-empirical. For instance, while the melting of ice is caused by a rise in temperature, the existence of a singleton set is grounded in the existence of its sole member. These two modes of dependence differ in directionality, modality, and ontological scope.

Grounding also contrasts with logical entailment and supervenience in being more fine-grained. While grounding implies entailment—if A grounds B, then necessarily, if A then B—the converse does not hold. Necessarily equivalent propositions need not stand in a grounding relation. For example, the propositions "2 + 2 = 4" and "the number of planets in the Solar System is 8" are both necessarily true, but neither grounds the other. This distinction is often framed in terms of grounding’s hyperintensionality: it is sensitive not just to truth-value or necessity, but to the manner in which facts are determined.

=== Explanation and hierarchical structure ===
Because grounding tracks metaphysical explanation rather than mere entailment, many philosophers regard it as a sui generis relation not reducible to other modal or logical notions. Rosen describes grounding as “the metaphysical analogue of explanation,” and Fine argues that grounding supports a “pure logic of ground” capturing explanatory priority in metaphysical structure.

Grounding is typically assumed to be asymmetric and irreflexive: if A grounds B, then B does not ground A, and no fact grounds itself. These properties give rise to a hierarchical conception of reality, where more fundamental facts or entities serve as the basis for less fundamental ones. This layered ontology is central to contemporary neo-Aristotelian metaphysics, which seeks to articulate not merely what exists, but how what exists is structured in terms of priority and dependence.

According to the neo-Aristotelian approach to ontology, the goal of ontology is to determine which entities are fundamental and how the non-fundamental entities depend on them. Fundamentality can be expressed in terms of grounding. For example, according to Aristotle, substances have the highest degree of fundamentality because they exist in themselves. Properties, on the other hand, are less fundamental because they depend on substances for their existence. In this example, properties are grounded in substances.

=== Grounding in contemporary debates ===
Contemporary interest in grounding is driven by the need for a systematic account of non-causal explanation. Many philosophers maintain that there are explanatory relations that do not involve causation—for example, the dependence of normative facts on descriptive ones (as in ethical naturalism), or of mental states on physical states (as in physicalism). Grounding has been proposed as the underlying metaphysical relation that makes sense of these forms of dependence.

Jonathan Schaffer has argued that “metaphysics is the science of what grounds what,” proposing that grounding—not existence per se—is the central organizing concept of metaphysical inquiry. This perspective has led to a wide range of applications: from modeling ontological dependence and fundamentality, to explicating reduction, explanation, and truthmaking. On this view, grounding provides not only a relation between facts, but a conceptual tool for understanding the architecture of reality itself.

== Historical antecedents ==
=== Aristotle and Neoplatonism ===
Although the technical vocabulary of metaphysical grounding is a recent development in analytic philosophy, the core idea—that some entities or truths depend upon more fundamental ones—has deep historical roots. Classical philosophers frequently described reality in terms of ontological hierarchies, where certain beings or truths were considered more basic or prior than others. These antecedents help contextualize contemporary debates, even if they lack the formal rigor or explicit terminology of modern accounts.

In Aristotle’s metaphysics, the notion of what is “prior in being” (proteron tou einai) versus “posterior” anticipates grounding relations. Aristotle holds that substance is ontologically prior to accidents, and that universals depend on particulars for their instantiation. In Metaphysics V.11, he writes: “That which is prior in substance is the cause of what is after in substance.” While this language is causal, its function is explanatory and structural rather than temporal. Similarly, the Posterior Analytics develops a conception of scientific explanation that invokes explanatory priority, wherein knowledge of effects is grounded in knowledge of causes.

Neoplatonism, particularly in the work of Plotinus, elaborates a metaphysical hierarchy grounded in the One. Plotinus’s doctrine of emanation describes all levels of reality as deriving from a single, most fundamental source, with each successive level depending ontologically on the level above it. This structure mirrors contemporary grounding models in which higher-level facts are grounded in more fundamental ones. Although the Neoplatonic scheme is metaphysically loaded, it exemplifies the explanatory and asymmetrical character associated with grounding.

=== Medieval perspectives ===
Medieval thinkers refined these ideas under the heading of ontological dependence. Thomas Aquinas distinguishes between beings that exist per se (through themselves) and those that exist per aliud (through another). This distinction underpins a hierarchical conception of creation, with God as the ungrounded ground of all other beings. The dependence of accidents on substances and of creatures on divine being were treated as real metaphysical asymmetries. These relations exhibit many of the formal features now attributed to grounding: asymmetry, irreflexivity, and (in many cases) transitivity.

=== Early modern developments ===
Grounding-like relations also appear in early modern philosophy, particularly in the systems of Baruch Spinoza and Gottfried Wilhelm Leibniz. Spinoza’s substance monism holds that all finite modes follow necessarily from the one infinite substance—God or nature—via a kind of metaphysical derivation. Though cast in geometrical terms, this derivational structure anticipates grounding frameworks where derivative entities obtain in virtue of the fundamental.

Leibniz likewise emphasizes explanatory priority and asymmetry. In his Monadology, he posits simple substances (monads) as ontologically basic, with all composite things depending on them. His commitment to the Principle of Sufficient Reason—that nothing is true without a reason why—encapsulates the explanatory ambitions that motivate contemporary grounding theory.

While these historical accounts lack the hyperintensional apparatus and logical formalism of recent grounding literature, they share its central concerns: explaining derivative entities or facts in terms of more basic ones. From Aristotle to Leibniz, the aspiration to understand reality through hierarchical dependence has been a recurring motif—one that contemporary metaphysicians now systematize under the heading of grounding.

== Formal properties ==
=== Partial order constraints ===
Grounding is widely treated as a binary relation (or a relation between pluralities and singulars) that satisfies a number of structural features. Many theorists—including Kit Fine, Gideon Rosen, and Michael Raven—have proposed formal constraints on the grounding relation, drawing analogies with the mathematical structure of strict partial orders. These features are intended to reflect the intuition that grounding arranges facts or entities into hierarchical levels of metaphysical priority.

The three most commonly attributed formal properties of grounding are:

- Irreflexivity: No fact or entity grounds itself.
- Asymmetry: If A grounds B, then B does not ground A.
- Transitivity: If A grounds B and B grounds C, then A grounds C.

Together, these properties entail that grounding is a strict partial order. Irreflexivity and asymmetry ensure that grounding proceeds in one direction only—from more fundamental to less fundamental—while transitivity supports the notion of layered dependence. For instance, if atomic facts ground molecular facts, and molecular facts ground macroscopic facts, then atomic facts also ground macroscopic facts.

=== Partial and incomplete grounds ===
These structural features have come under scrutiny, particularly in connection with so-called "partial grounding" or "incomplete grounds." Some have argued that transitivity fails in certain edge cases, especially where B is only partially grounded by A. Jonathan Schaffer and Benjamin Schnieder have suggested that grounding may require contrastive or contextual qualification to preserve transitivity, while others hold that transitivity might hold only for full or complete grounds.

=== Factivity and hyperintensionality ===
Grounding is also said to be factive: if A grounds B, then both A and B must be true. This condition differentiates grounding from many modal or logical entailment relations, which can hold between false propositions. Grounding’s factivity aligns it with explanatory relations: one cannot explain a falsehood by appeal to a truth, nor vice versa. In this respect, grounding resembles truthmaker theory.

One of the most distinctive features of grounding is its hyperintensionality. A hyperintensional relation is one that is sensitive not only to the truth-values of its relata, but to their particular modes of presentation. Grounding can distinguish between necessarily equivalent facts that differ in explanatory structure. For example, the fact that "2 + 2 = 4" and the fact that "the number of planets in the solar system is 8" are both necessarily true, yet neither grounds the other. Likewise, the fact that an object is red may ground the fact that it is colored, even if the two facts might be necessarily coextensive in some contexts. Logical entailment fails to make this distinction, and thus cannot substitute for grounding in capturing metaphysical explanation.

=== Non-monotonicity ===
Grounding is also often assumed to be non-monotonic. In classical logic, if a conclusion follows from a set of premises, it also follows from any superset of those premises. But grounding does not behave this way: adding irrelevant or extraneous facts to the grounds can undermine explanatory sufficiency. For instance, the fact that A grounds B does not entail that A together with some irrelevant fact C grounds B. This non-monotonicity is particularly salient in debates about minimal grounds and explanatory relevance.

=== Well-foundedness debate ===
These formal properties have encouraged metaphysicians to model grounding in terms of well-founded structures, such as directed acyclic graphs (DAGs), where nodes represent facts and edges represent grounding relations. On this view, reality is a stratified structure: all derivative facts trace back, through chains of grounding, to a base layer of fundamental facts that are ungrounded. Whether grounding must always be well-founded—i.e., whether there can be infinitely descending chains of grounding relations—is a matter of ongoing debate. Some, like Schaffer, endorse a foundationalist picture, while others, such as Ricki Bliss and Naomi Thompson, have questioned whether infinite regress should be precluded.

== Grounding and explanation ==
=== Unionist vs. separatist views ===
A central philosophical debate concerns the relationship between grounding and explanation. At issue is whether grounding is a form of explanation, or whether it is a metaphysical relation that merely underwrites explanatory discourse. The two leading positions in this debate are often referred to as the unionist and separatist views.

The unionist view, defended by philosophers such as Kit Fine and Gideon Rosen, holds that grounding just is metaphysical explanation. On this view, when one says that A grounds B, one is making an explanatory claim: B obtains because of A, where "because" expresses a primitive metaphysical notion. Fine has argued that grounding is the core of what he calls a "pure logic of ground," while Rosen similarly treats grounding claims as explanatory assertions, expressing why certain facts obtain in terms of more fundamental facts.

The separatist view, in contrast, maintains that grounding is a metaphysical relation distinct from explanation, though closely connected to it. According to this perspective, defended by philosophers such as Michael Raven and Fabrice Correia, grounding is a metaphysical dependency between facts or entities, while explanation is a linguistic or epistemic activity that tracks this dependency. On the separatist view, grounding is the objective structure of metaphysical determination, while explanation is our way of representing or articulating that structure.

=== Explanation scope and norms ===
The unionist–separatist distinction has implications for the semantics and logic of grounding. Unionists often favor a “connective” approach, representing grounding with an explanatory connective such as “because.” Separatists, by contrast, treat grounding as a binary predicate—e.g., Grounds(A, B)—and develop logical systems in which this predicate plays a central inferential role.

Another point of divergence concerns the explanatory scope of grounding. For unionists, grounding is inherently explanatory: every instance of grounding involves an explanatory connection that can, in principle, be articulated. For separatists, grounding may occur even where no explanation is available or expressible—e.g., in cases of ineffability, brute necessity, or epistemic limitations.

Recent work has explored whether grounding explanations should obey norms akin to those governing scientific or causal explanation (e.g., non-redundancy, minimality, contrastivity), or whether grounding represents a distinct explanatory genre with its own standards. Either way, grounding is widely regarded as key to capturing non-causal, metaphysical explanation.

== Logical formalization ==
Efforts to formalize the concept of grounding have proceeded along two main lines, often called the “connective” and “relational” approaches. Each approach handles the syntax and semantics of grounding differently, carrying distinct logical and ontological commitments.

=== Connective approach ===
Kit Fine has pioneered a connective approach, treating grounding as a sentential connective (e.g., “B because A”) analogous to logical connectives like “and” or “if...then.” In Fine’s formal system, known as the “pure logic of ground,” grounding claims are expressed by a non-truth-functional operator. One might, for example, treat “B because A” as a basic unit in logical analysis, subject to introduction and elimination rules (including transitivity). Fine also assumes grounding is factive (both A and B must be true) and explores axioms governing conjunction and disjunction in grounding contexts.

=== Relational approach ===
By contrast, Gideon Rosen, Jonathan Schaffer, and Michael Raven favor a relational approach, formalizing grounding as a binary predicate—e.g., Grounds(A, B)—that relates one fact (or proposition) to another. This approach allows grounding to be incorporated into first-order logical systems, possibly with quantification over “facts,” “propositions,” or “states of affairs.” Relational theories often pair with structured-proposition frameworks or hyperintensional semantics (like truthmaker semantics) to accommodate the fine-grained explanatory distinctions that grounding requires.

=== Additional considerations ===
Both approaches must address grounding’s hyperintensionality—its sensitivity to more than mere truth-values or necessary equivalences. Classical logic and standard possible-worlds semantics often fail to differentiate necessarily equivalent statements that differ in explanatory structure. This motivates the use of non-classical tools, such as truthmaker semantics or other hyperintensional frameworks.

Some philosophers also model grounding relations using directed acyclic graphs (DAGs), where nodes represent facts and arrows represent the grounding relation. This visual metaphor highlights how derivative facts depend on more fundamental ones, often assuming (though not universally) that grounding chains terminate in a set of ungrounded facts. Disagreements remain over whether grounding must be well-founded, how to regiment grounding claims logically, and what ontological commitments these approaches incur.

== Unity versus plurality ==
=== Unified grounding relation ===
A further debate in the grounding literature concerns whether there is a single unified grounding relation or a plurality of distinct dependence relations that serve different roles across different metaphysical domains. Proponents of a unified grounding relation, such as Kit Fine and Jonathan Schaffer, argue that grounding constitutes a general metaphysical dependence relation that applies uniformly across all domains. On this view, grounding explains how moral facts depend on natural facts, how mental states depend on physical states, how composite objects depend on their parts, and so on.

=== Pluralist objections ===
By contrast, pluralists—including Jessica Wilson, Kathrin Koslicki, and others—argue that the alleged instances of grounding differ too widely (e.g., set membership vs. parthood vs. realization) to be subsumed by one relation. Karen Bennett proposes a moderate pluralism wherein “grounding” is just one among many “building relations,” each of which is directed, asymmetric, and explanatory, but which remain importantly distinct.

== Criticisms and skepticism ==
=== Redundancy and regress concerns ===
Despite its growing prominence, the concept of grounding has faced substantial criticism from philosophers skeptical of its coherence, necessity, or theoretical utility. One influential critique is offered by Jessica Wilson, who argues that grounding, as commonly invoked, fails to provide explanatory resources beyond what is already supplied by more specific dependence relations (like realization or constitution) plus the notion of fundamentality. She calls grounding “explanatorily redundant.”

Karen Bennett, while more sympathetic to grounding, has raised the problem of “meta-grounding”: if grounding facts themselves require grounding, an infinite regress or circularity may ensue. If they do not, grounding might violate its own principles.

=== Epistemic challenges ===
Other critics, such as Naomi Thompson and Jonathan Tallant, question the epistemic basis of grounding claims, wondering whether they can be supported by anything more than controversial philosophical intuitions.

=== Responses and refinements ===
Defenders of grounding respond with more precise formalizations and domain-specific arguments. Jonathan Schaffer acknowledges that early grounding literature was imprecise but maintains that grounding can be sharpened into a rigorous framework for metaphysical explanation. Others, including Fabrice Correia and Benjamin Schnieder, have developed logical systems that delineate different forms or “grades” of grounding, aiming to meet objections about redundancy and regress.

== Applications ==
=== Philosophy of mind ===
Despite ongoing theoretical disputes, metaphysical grounding has been applied across a wide range of philosophical domains. In the philosophy of mind, grounding is often invoked to articulate forms of non-reductive physicalism. According to this view, mental states are not identical to physical states, but are nonetheless grounded in them. This allows theorists to avoid the problems of reductionism while preserving the core physicalist commitment: mental facts are “nothing over and above” the physical because they are fully grounded by physical facts.

=== Metaethics ===
In metaethics, grounding plays a central role in debates over moral realism and moral naturalism. Many naturalists hold that moral facts are grounded in descriptive or natural facts (e.g., about human well-being, preferences, or social practices), thus making them metaphysically dependent but not reducible. By contrast, some non-naturalist moral realists argue that moral facts are fundamental and ungrounded. Grounding thus provides a formal vocabulary for expressing the vertical structure of metaethical commitments.

=== Truthmaker theory and metaphysics of science ===
Grounding is closely related to, and often employed within, truthmaker theory. Truthmaker theorists draw a distinction between truthmakers and truthbearers. Truthbearers, such as beliefs, sentences, or propositions, are said not to be intrinsically true or false but convey the truth of some other thing. Truths are grounded in the facts that make them true—e.g., the proposition “snow is white” is true in virtue of (or grounded in) the fact that snow is white.

In the metaphysics of science, grounding has been used to analyze the relation between laws of nature and the regularities they govern, or between dispositional properties and their manifestations. For example, the disposition of salt to dissolve in water may be grounded in the molecular structure of sodium chloride. Grounding has also been applied to debates about natural kinds, modality, and the nature of scientific explanation.

=== Other domains ===
Grounding has found applications in mathematical Platonism and formal ontology. In ontology, grounding helps articulate dependence relations among abstract entities (e.g., numbers, sets, categories), distinguishing primitive from derivative structures.

Grounding also plays a role in legal philosophy, metaphilosophy, and social ontology. In legal theory, scholars have explored how legal facts (e.g., “X is a valid statute”) are grounded in institutional facts such as legislative enactments or judicial decisions. In social ontology, grounding helps clarify how social entities (e.g., money, corporations, marriages) depend on collective intentionality and constitutive rules.

== See also ==
- Truthmaker theory
- Ontological dependence
- Metametaphysics
