= Understanding Consciousness =

Book by Max Velmans

- Author: Max Velmans
- Genre: Philosophy of mind, metaphysics, consciousness studies
- Publisher: Routledge
- Publication date: 22 June 2000
- Publication place: UK
- Pages: 296 (first edition hardback)
- ISBN: 978-0415186551

Understanding Consciousness (2000) is a book by Max Velmans, Emeritus Professor of Psychology at Goldsmiths, University of London, which combines an account of scientific studies of consciousness with a perspective from the philosophy of mind. The book was shortlisted for the British Psychological Society book of the year award in 2001 and 2002. Philip Pullman called it "one of the clearest and most elegant accounts" he had seen of the topic.

== Synopsis ==
Part 1 reviews the strengths and weaknesses of all currently dominant theories of consciousness, in a form suitable for undergraduates, postgraduates and researchers, focusing mainly on dualism, physicalism, functionalism and consciousness in machines. Part 2 gives a new analysis of consciousness, grounded in its everyday phenomenology, which challenges presuppositions that form the basis of the dualism versus reductionist debate. It also examines the consequences for realism versus idealism, subjectivity, intersubjectivity and objectivity, and the relation of consciousness to brain processing. Part 3 gives a new synthesis, with a novel approach to understanding what consciousness is, and a novel approach to what consciousness does that pays particular attention to the paradoxes surrounding the causal interactions of consciousness with the brain. It also introduces reflexive monism, an alternative to dualism and reductionism that aims to be consistent with the findings of science and with common sense.

Both reductionism and dualism are guilty, Velmans asserts, of not paying enough attention to the phenomenology of consciousness, the condition of being aware of something. Reductionism, for example, attempts to reduce consciousness to being a state of the brain; thus consciousness is nothing more than its neural causes and correlates. This, Velmans says, is guilty of breaking Leibniz's assertion that, in order for A to be identical to B (that is, for consciousness to be a state of the brain), the properties of A must also be the properties of B. Velmans here argues that the subjective, phenomenal experience of consciousness is entirely unlike the neural states of the brain, and thus may not be reduced to them; that is, the phenomenal properties of consciousness are not identifiable with the physical brain states that arguably cause them.
