= Reflexive monism =

Reflexive monism is a philosophical position developed by Max Velmans, in his books Understanding Consciousness (2000, 2009) and Toward a Deeper Understanding of Consciousness (2017), to address the problems of consciousness. It is a modern version of an ancient view that the basic stuff of the universe manifests itself both physically and as conscious experience (a dual-aspect theory in the traditions of Spinoza and Fechner). The argument is that the mind and, ultimately, the universe is psycho-physical.

Monism is the view that the universe, at the deepest level of analysis, is composed of one fundamental kind of stuff. This is usually contrasted with substance dualism, the view found in the writings of Plato and Descartes that the universe is composed of two kinds of stuff, the physical and the stuff of soul, mind or consciousness.

Reflexive monism maintains that, in its evolution from some primal undifferentiated state, the universe differentiates into distinguishable physical entities, at least some of which have the potential for conscious experience, such as human beings. While remaining embedded within and dependent on the surrounding universe and composed of the same fundamental stuff, each human, equipped with perceptual and cognitive systems, has an individual perspective on, or view of, the rest of the universe and themself. In this sense, each human participates in a process whereby the universe differentiates into parts and becomes conscious of itself, making the process reflexive. Donald Price and James Barrell write that, according to reflexive monism, experience and matter are two complementary (first- and third-person viewable) sides of the same reality, and neither can be reduced to the other. That brain states are causes and correlates of consciousness, they write, does not mean that they are ontologically identical to it, and they develop the use of complementary first- and third-person perspectives into a non-reductive, empirical program for investigating the relationship of conscious experience to neuroscience.

A similar combination of monism and reflexivity is found in later Vedic writings such as the Upanishads, as well as the Buddhist views of Chittamatra and Dzogchen.
