= Eli Hirsch =

American philosopher (born 1938)

- Born: 1938 (age 87–88)

Education
- Education: CUNY – Brooklyn College (BA); New York University (MA, PhD)

Philosophical work
- Era: Contemporary philosophy
- Region: Western philosophy
- School: Analytic
- Institutions: Brandeis University
- Main interests: Metaphysics, meta-ontology, epistemology
- Notable ideas: Quantifier variance, soft ontology

Eli Hirsch (born 1938) is an American philosopher and the Charles Goldman Professor of Philosophy at Brandeis University.

Hirsch received a B.A. from CUNY – Brooklyn College, and an M.A. and Ph.D. from NYU.

His brother is Rabbi Moshe Hillel Hirsch, the Rosh Yeshiva of the Slabodka yeshiva and a leader of the Haredi community in Israel.

Hirsch has authored over 70 books and papers on metaphysics and epistemology. He is best known for his work in meta-ontology, having introduced the concepts of "quantifier variance" and "soft ontology". Many of his writings deal with objections to ontology based upon common sense and claim that disputes about what exists generally revolve around linguistics and are merely verbal in nature.
