= Absolute generality =

In philosophical logic, metaphysics, and the philosophy of language, the problem of absolute generality is the problem of referring to absolutely everything. Historically, philosophers have assumed that some of their statements are absolutely general, referring to truly everything. In recent years, logicians working in the logic of quantification and paradox have challenged this view, arguing that it is impossible for the logical quantifiers to range over an absolutely unrestricted domain.

Philosophers who deny the possibility of absolutely unrestricted quantification (often called generality relativists) argue that attempting to speak absolutely generally generates paradoxes such as Russell's or Grelling's, that absolute generality leads to indeterminacy due to the Löwenheim–Skolem theorem, or that absolute generality fails because the notion of "object" is relative.

Philosophers who believe that we can indeed quantify over absolutely everything (known as generality absolutists), such as Timothy Williamson, may respond by noting that it is difficult to see how a skeptic of absolute generality can frame this view without invoking the concept of absolute generality.

A 2006 book, Absolute Generality, published by Oxford University Press, contains essays on the subject written by both the leading proponents and opponents of absolutely unrestricted quantification.

== See also ==
- Domain of discourse
- Metametaphysics
- Quantifier variance
