= Quantifier variance =

The term quantifier variance refers to claims that there is no uniquely best ontological language with which to describe the world. The term "quantifier variance" rests upon the philosophical term 'quantifier', more precisely existential quantifier. A 'quantifier' is an expression like "there exists at least one 'such-and-such'". Quantifier variance then is the thesis that the meaning of quantifiers is ambiguous. This thesis can be used to explain how some disputes in ontology are only due to a failure of the disagreeing parties to agree on the meaning of the quantifiers used.

According to Eli Hirsch, it is an outgrowth of Urmson's dictum:

If two sentences are equivalent to each other, then while the use of one rather than the other may be useful for some philosophical purposes, it is not the case that one will be nearer to reality than the other...We can say a thing this way, and we can say it that way, sometimes...But it is no use asking which is the logically or metaphysically right way to say it.

— James Opie Urmson, Philosophical Analysis, p. 186

== Quantifiers ==
The word quantifier in the introduction refers to a variable used in a domain of discourse, a collection of objects under discussion. In daily life, the domain of discourse could be 'apples', or 'persons', or even everything. In a more technical arena, the domain of discourse could be 'integers', say. The quantifier variable x, say, in the given domain of discourse can take on the 'value' or designate any object in the domain. The presence of a particular object, say a 'unicorn' is expressed in the manner of symbolic logic as:

∃ x; x is a unicorn.

Here the 'turned E ' or ∃ is read as "there exists..." and is called the symbol for existential quantification. Relations between objects also can be expressed using quantifiers. For example, in the domain of integers (denoting the quantifier by n, a customary choice for an integer) we can indirectly identify '5' by its relation with the number '25':

∃ n; n × n = 25.

If we want to point out specifically that the domain of integers is meant, we could write:

∃ n ∈ $\mathbb{Z}$; n × n = 25.

Here, ∈ = is a member of... and ∈ is called the symbol for set membership; and $\mathbb{Z}$ denotes the set of integers.

There are a variety of expressions that serve the same purpose in various ontologies, and they are accordingly all quantifier expressions. Quantifier variance is then one argument concerning exactly what expressions can be construed as quantifiers, and just which arguments of a quantifier, that is, which substitutions for "such-and-such", are permissible.

== Usage, not 'existence'? ==
Hirsch says the notion of quantifier variance is a concept concerning how languages work, and is not connected to the ontological question of what 'really' exists. That view is not universal.

The thesis underlying quantifier variance was stated by Putnam:

The logical primitives themselves, and in particular the notions of object and existence, have a multitude of different uses rather than one absolute 'meaning'.

— Hilary Putnam, "Truth and Convention", p. 71

Citing this quotation from Putnam, Wasserman states: "This thesis – the thesis that there are many meanings for the existential quantifier that are equally neutral and equally adequate for describing all the facts – is often referred to as 'the doctrine of quantifier variance'".

Hirsch's quantifier variance has been connected to Carnap's idea of a linguistic framework as a 'neo'-Carnapian view, namely, "the view that there are a number of equally good meanings of the logical quantifiers; choosing one of these frameworks is to be understood analogously to choosing a Carnapian framework." Of course, not all philosophers (notably Quine and the 'neo'-Quineans) subscribe to the notion of multiple linguistic frameworks. See meta-ontology.

Hirsch himself suggests some care in connecting his version of quantifier variance with Carnap: "Let's not call any philosophers quantifier variantists unless they are clearly committed to the idea that (most of) the things that exist are completely independent of language." In this connection Hirsch says "I have a problem, however, in calling Carnap a quantifier variantist, insofar as he is often viewed as a verificationist anti-realist." Although Thomasson does not think Carnap is properly considered to be an antirealist, she still disassociates Carnap from Hirsch's version of quantifier variance: "I'll argue, however, that Carnap in fact is not committed to quantifier variance in anything like Hirsch's sense, and that he [Carnap] does not rely on it in his ways of deflating metaphysical debates."

== See also ==
- Ordinary language philosophy
- Metaphilosophy
- Mereology
- Internal–external distinction
- Absolute generality
