= Max Velmans =

British psychologist

Max Velmans is a British psychologist and emeritus professor of psychology at Goldsmiths, University of London, principally known for the theory of consciousness called "reflexive monism".

Reflexive monism bridges the materialist/dualist divide by noting that, in terms of their phenomenology, experiences of the external world are none other than the physical world-as-experienced, thereby placing aspects of human consciousness in the external phenomenal world, rather than exclusively within the head or brain. A similar point of departure is adopted in much of European phenomenology. The theory then explores the consequences of this point of departure for a different understanding of various conventional ways of distinguishing mental from physical phenomena, such as internal versus external phenomena, private versus public phenomena, subjective versus objective phenomena, and the world-as-experienced versus the world as described by physics. The theory also combines facets of realism (for the existence of reality per se), with idealism (for the existence of the phenomenal world), which falls short of avowing the necessity of perception to the existence of reality per se (the principle of "esse est percipi").

Velmans has around 100 publications in the area of consciousness studies in which he develops this basic point of departure into a general theory that addresses the many problems of consciousness, including Understanding Consciousness (2000, 2009), and Towards a Deeper Understanding of Consciousness (2017). In his map of prominent theories of consciousness Francisco Varela categorises Velmans' work as non-reductionist, stressing the importance of first-person accounts of the phenomenology of consciousness, as well as third-person accounts of brain states and functions, which in Velmans' work are thought of as complementary.

== Biography ==
Born in Amsterdam, Velmans grew up in Sydney, Australia. After attending Sydney Boy's High School, he studied Electrical Engineering at St. Andrews College at the University of Sydney, where he received his B.Eng in 1963. In the evening he attended psychology classes at the University of Sydney for another two years, before moving to Europe. After several years of research and development he received his PhD in psychology from Bedford College in 1974. After his graduation in 1963 Velmans had started his career designing electrical circuits at the electronics laboratory of the Australian engineering company EMAIL Ltd.

== Academic career ==
Velmans began his academic teaching career at The City University, London, in 1967, and joined Goldsmiths, University of London, in 1969. Over the next three decades, he held teaching and research roles focusing on cognitive psychology, language, memory, attention, philosophy of science, and consciousness studies. His undergraduate course “The Psychology of Consciousness,” taught over 25 years, was one of the earliest mainstream UK university courses dedicated to consciousness. Velmans co-founded the Consciousness and Experiential Psychology Section of the British Psychological Society in 1994, and served as its chair from 2003 to 2006.

In 1997 he was awarded a Fellowship of the British Psychological Society and in 2011 was elected to a Fellowship of the British Academy of Social Sciences. He was appointed emeritus professor of psychology at Goldsmiths in 2006. Between 2007 and 2014, he held the position of visiting professor of consciousness studies at the University of Plymouth. In 2011–2012, he was appointed National Visiting Professor by the Indian Council of Philosophical Research, under the Ministry of Human Resources, Government of India. Velmans has also been a visiting professor at the University of Westminster and was a Senior Fulbright Scholar and research associate at the University of California, Berkeley, in 1984. In 1997, he was a faculty member of the University of Arizona's online "Dialogues on Consciousness" course.

== Work ==
=== Early Work: Deafness Research ===
During the early phase of his academic career, Velmans made a contribution to auditory science through the invention and development of an innovative hearing aid designed to assist individuals with sensorineural hearing loss.

While a postgraduate student at Bedford College, University of London, in 1970, Velmans devised a frequency-transposing hearing aid, later named FRED (Frequency Recognition and Enhancement Device). This device was specifically designed to aid individuals with little or no residual hearing above 4 kHz by shifting high-frequency sounds into lower, more audible frequency ranges. The goal was to expand the detectable auditory spectrum and thereby improve the perception of speech and environmental sounds for the hearing impaired.

The technical novelty and potential clinical utility of FRED led to patents being awarded in the United Kingdom, United States, and Japan in 1973. The invention was subsequently adopted by the British Technology Group, and in 1977 Velmans received substantial external funding from the Department of Health and Social Security (DHSS), the Medical Research Council (MRC), and the British Technology Group to support an extensive research and development programme. Between 1977 and 1987, this multidisciplinary research initiative received over £100,000 in grants (approximately £300,000 in today's currency) and engaged specialists in psychoacoustics, electrical engineering, deafness rehabilitation, and the psychology of language.

Over the course of a decade, Max Velmans directed a programme of experimental and clinical research evaluating the FRED (Frequency Recognition and Enhancement Device) system. This work focused on assessing the device's effectiveness in improving speech and environmental sound perception in adults with acquired hearing loss, as well as its impact on speech perception and production in congenitally deaf children. Under Velmans' leadership, the programme produced various iterations of the aid including body-worn, desktop, and radio transmission models and developed clinical protocols for diagnosis, training, and rehabilitation. The research was conducted in collaboration with NHS hearing aid clinics, the Royal National Institute for Deaf People (RNID), and a network of academic and industrial partners.

The results of the programme were documented in three major reports, totalling approximately 500 pages, and submitted to the Department of Health and Social Security (DHSS) and the Medical Research Council (MRC), with copies distributed to research centres both in the UK and internationally. The findings were further disseminated through fifteen peer-reviewed journal articles, including in The British Journal of Audiology and Language and Speech, and were presented by Velmans at more than twenty scientific conferences and six technical exhibitions. The project received significant public and professional attention, featuring in media coverage, BBC World Service broadcasts, and television programmes such as BBC2's Medical Express.

The Royal Society selected the work for exhibition at its "Conversaziones" on two occasions, and the British Society of Audiology entered a working version of the device into the National Hearing Aid Museum.

=== Understanding Consciousness ===
Velmans' Understanding Consciousness (2000, 2009) is a comprehensive summary of his theoretical work, and introduces the idea of "reflexive monism."

Reflexive monism presents itself as an alternative to both dualism and reductionism. It states that it does not make sense to speak of phenomenological experiences of reality as occurring solely within the brain, given that some of them quite clearly occur within the experienced world itself (for example, asked to point to an external light as-experienced, almost all rational subjects would point to the light that is experienced rather than to the brain, which is where, according to dualists and reductionists, the experience actually takes place). Thus, Velmans argues, the relationship between subjects and experienced reality is reflexive: some experiences apprehended by the subject are quite clearly placed "in the world" by the perceiving mind. The contents of consciousness are, thus, not exclusively in the brain, but often in the perceived physical world itself; in fact, in terms of phenomenology, there is no clear and distinct difference between what we normally think of as the "physical world", the "phenomenal world" and the "world as perceived". He writes:

This sketch of how consciousness fits into the wider universe supports a form of non-reductive, Reflexive Monism. Human minds, bodies and brains are embedded in a far greater universe. Individual conscious representations are perspectival. That is, the precise manner in which entities, events and processes are translated into experiences depends on the location in space and time of a given observer, and the exact mix of perceptual, cognitive, affective, social, cultural and historical influences which enter into the 'construction' of a given experience. In this sense, each conscious construction is private, subjective, and unique. Taken together, the contents of consciousness provide a view of the wider universe, giving it the appearance of a 3D phenomenal world. ... However, such conscious representations are not the thing-itself. In this vision, there is one universe (the thing-itself), with relatively differentiated parts in the form of conscious beings like ourselves, each with a unique, conscious view of the larger universe of which it is a part. In so far as we are parts of the universe that, in turn, experience the larger universe, we participate in a reflexive process whereby the universe experiences itself."

=== Changing Places ===
The changing places thought experiment is one of many conceived by Velmans, discussed in Understanding Consciousness. The experiment was designed to demonstrate the difficulties in distinguishing phenomenologically between a "subjective" first-person experience of a given event or object and a third-person "objective" observation of the same event or object. It also throws doubt on the supposed contrast between the "subjectivity" of a subject's experience and the supposed "objectivity" of an external observer's observations of the neural correlates of that experience in the subject's brain.

Velmans conceives of a situation in which an experimenter ("E") is observing a subject ("S") exposed to a light stimulus. The differences between the two viewpoints, Velmans argues, is primarily derived from a difference in interest, reflected in a difference in their required activities. To explain, during the experiment S is required only to report on her experiences of the light, which she needs to communicate to E in an appropriate manner. E, on the other hand, is interested primarily in S's experience of the light, and thus E's focus is not just on the light (which he thinks of as a "stimulus") but also on the observable events in S's brain, and on S's reports concerning what she experiences. Thus, E is interested first and foremost in the subject's experience, and how these relate to the light stimulus and brain states of S that he can observe. In such a case, E's experience of events would be considered "objective" or "public", while S's experiences are "subjective" and "private"; while E's focus is on recording the neural causes and correlates of visual experiences, S is interested only in reporting about such experiences.

However, Velmans points out that all that would be required for S and E to exchange roles is for them to change their respective foci (as he puts it "S and E merely have to turn their heads"), so that E focuses exclusively on the light and reports his experiences, while S focuses her attention not just on the light, but on the events in E's brain and his reports of the experience. In such a situation, S becomes the experimenter and E becomes the subject; thus, following current conventions, "S would now be entitled to think of her observations (of the light and E's brain) as 'public and objective' and to regard E's experiences of the light as 'private and subjective'."

Velmans points out that this outcome is patently absurd, as the phenomenology of the light (that is, the way it is experienced) remains the same from the perspective of S or E, whether it is thought of as being an observed stimulus or a subjective experience. Nothing has changed in the nature of the light that either party can observe, save in the contextualising focus of their interests. That is, Velmans concludes, there is no phenomenological difference between publicly observed phenomena and private, subjective experiences. This becomes a point of departure for a more nuanced analysis of subjectivity, intersubjectivity and objectivity, and ultimately for an epistemology for the study of consciousness that, according to Velmans, fits psychology smoothly into science.

=== Reflexive Monism ===
Reflexive Monism is a theoretical framework developed by Velmans as a non-reductive, dual-aspect monist account of the relationship between consciousness and the physical world. Introduced formally in his early 1990s writings and extensively elaborated in Understanding Consciousness (2000; 2nd ed. 2009), Velmans' Reflexive Monism offers a systematic alternative to both Cartesian dualism and mainstream physicalist theories of mind. It seeks to integrate first-person phenomenological accounts of experience with third-person scientific descriptions of brain and behavior without reducing one to the other. Velmans formulated Reflexive Monism as part of a broader critique of reductive functionalism and identity theories, arguing that such models fail to account for the intrinsic qualities of subjective experience. Instead, he proposed that conscious experiences and physical brain processes are complementary appearances of a single underlying reality. In this view, consciousness is not something that occurs "inside the head" or a computational by-product of information processing; rather, it is the reflexive manifestation of the world as experienced from the perspective of the embodied subject. For example, in visual perception, the perceived object such as a tree is not a mental copy stored within the brain but is the tree as it appears in experience, reflexively related to the observing organism.

Drawing on Bohr's principle of complementarity, Velmans argued that while empirical science can investigate the neural correlates of consciousness, the qualitative nature of experience must be understood through phenomenological and intersubjective methods.

He introduced a dual-aspect theory of information, suggesting that informational states possess both neurophysiological and experiential properties. His foundational papers, including Consciousness, Brain and the Physical World (1990) and a widely discussed 1991 target article in Behavioral and Brain Sciences, challenged reductive accounts of consciousness and initiated broad scholarly debate.

Over subsequent decades, Velmans elaborated Reflexive Monism across multiple publications and explored its intersections with non-Western traditions such as Integral Vedanta, emphasizing panentheistic and dual-aspect conceptions of mind and reality. He has consistently advocated for an intersubjective science that integrates experiential and empirical approaches, establishing Reflexive Monism as a leading framework in consciousness studies.

== Selected publications ==
Velmans is the author and editor of numerous books and papers on consciousness, including the following:

=== Books ===
- Consciousness (Critical Concepts in Psychology) Major Works Series (4 Volumes) (Routledge, 2018)
- Towards a Deeper Understanding of Consciousness (Routledge, 2017)
- Understanding Consciousness (Routledge/Psychology Press, London, 2000), edition 2 (Routledge/Psychology Press, London, 2009)
- The Blackwell Companion to Consciousness (jointly edited with Susan Schneider - Blackwell, 2007)
- The Blackwell Companion to Consciousness Second Edition (jointly edited with Susan Schneider, Wiley-Blackwell, 2017)
- How Could Conscious Experiences Affect Brains? (Imprint, 2003)
- Investigating Phenomenal Consciousness (John Benjamins, 2000)
- The Science of Consciousness: Psychological, Neuropsychological and Clinical Reviews (Routledge, 1996)

=== Journals ===
- Velmans, Max (2012). "The evolution of consciousness". Contemporary Social Science. 7 (2): 117–138. doi:10.1080/21582041.2012.692099. ISSN 2158-2041.
- Velmans, Max (2012). "Reflexive Monism Psychophysical Relations Among Mind, Matter, and Consciousness". Journal of Consciousness Studies. 19 (9–10): 143–165.
- Velmans, Max (2009). "How to Define Consciousness–and How Not to Define Consciousness". Journal of Consciousness Studies. 16 (5): 139–156.
- Velmans, Max (2008). "Reflexive Monism". Journal of Consciousness Studies. 15 (2): 5–50.
- Velmans, Max (2007). "The Co-Evolution of Matter and Consciousness". Synthesis Philosophica. 22 (2): 273–282. ISSN 0352-7875.
- Velmans, Max (2 October 2007). "Where experiences are: Dualist, physicalist, enactive and reflexive accounts of phenomenal consciousness". Phenomenology and the Cognitive Sciences. 6 (4): 547–563. doi:10.1007/s11097-007-9071-1. ISSN 1568-7759.
- Velmans, Max (7 September 2007). "A Natural Account of Phenomenal Consciousness". NeuroQuantology. 3 (3). doi:10.14704/nq.2005.3.3.70. ISSN 1303-5150.
- Velmans, Max (15 November 2006). "Heterophenomenology versus critical phenomenology". Phenomenology and the Cognitive Sciences. 6 (1–2): 221–230. doi:10.1007/s11097-006-9033-z. ISSN 1568-7759.
- Velmans, Max (2002). "How Could Conscious Experiences Affect Brains?". Journal of Consciousness Studies. 9 (11): 3–29.

=== Chapters ===
- Velmans, Max, ed. (2021). "Is the Universe Conscious?". Consciousness Unbound. pp. 175–228. doi:10.5040/9798881814885.ch5. ISBN 979-8-8818-1488-5.
- Velmans, Max (17 March 2017). "An Epistemology for the Study of Consciousness". The Blackwell Companion to Consciousness. pp. 769–784. doi:10.1002/9781119132363.ch54. ISBN 978-0-470-67406-2.
- Velmans, Max (19 October 2013), "Conscious Agency and the Preconscious/Unconscious Self", Interdisciplinary Perspectives on Consciousness and the Self, New Delhi: Springer India, pp. 11–25, doi:10.1007/978-81-322-1587-5_2, ISBN 978-81-322-1586-8
- "How to arrive at an Eastern place from a Western direction: Convergences and divergences among Samkhya Dualism, Advaita Nondualism, the Body–Mind–Consciousness Trident Model and Reflexive Monism (2013)", Towards a Deeper Understanding of Consciousness, Routledge, 14 October 2016, pp. 206–233, doi:10.4324/9781315516776-17, ISBN 978-1-315-51677-6
- Velmans, Max (2014). "Sentient matter". In Harvey, Graham (ed.). The handbook of contemporary animism. Oxon [England]: Routledge. doi:10.4324/9781315728964-41. ISBN 978-1-315-72896-4.
- Velmans, Max (2009), "Psychophysical Nature", Recasting Reality, Berlin, Heidelberg: Springer Berlin Heidelberg, pp. 115–134, doi:10.1007/978-3-540-85198-1_6, ISBN 978-3-540-85197-4
- Velmans, Max (2007), "How to separate conceptual issues from empirical ones in the study of consciousness", Models of Brain and Mind - Physical, Computational and Psychological Approaches, Progress in Brain Research, vol. 168, Elsevier, pp. 1–9, doi:10.1016/s0079-6123(07)68001-7, ISBN 978-0-444-53050-9, PMID 18166381
- Velmans, Max (13 December 2007), "An Epistemology for the Study of Consciousness", The Blackwell Companion to Consciousness, Malden, MA, USA: Blackwell Publishing, pp. 711–725, doi:10.1002/9780470751466.ch56, ISBN 978-0-470-75146-6
