= Contrastivism =

Epistemological theory

Contrastivism, or the contrast theory of meaning, is an epistemological theory proposed by Jonathan Schaffer that suggests that knowledge attributions have a ternary structure of the form 'S knows that p rather than q'. This is in contrast to the traditional view whereby knowledge attributions have a binary structure of the form 'S knows that p'. Contrastivism was suggested as an alternative to contextualism. Both are semantic theories that try to explain skepticism using semantic methods.

Walter Sinnott-Armstrong proposed in a paper titled "A Contrastivist Manifesto" a variant of contrastivism that, he argues, differs from contextualism, invariantism, and Schaffer's contrastivism.

Ernest Gellner in Words and Things "terms derive their meaning from the fact that there are or could be things which fall under them and that there are others which do not."

== The contrast clause ==
The '...rather than q' part of the knowledge attribution is known as the 'contrast clause'. This is what separates it from traditional binary formulations. Rather than taking the same road as contextualism and saying that the meaning of 'knows' can change with attributor context the contrastivist claims that it is the unspoken contrast clause that changes. This can be used to avoid skeptical problems.

== See also ==
- Contrast (linguistics)
- Meaning (linguistic), meaning which is communicated through the use of language.
- Meaning (non-linguistic)
