= Sealioning =

Type of trolling or harassment

The Terrible Sea Lion by David Malki (19 September 2014, No. 1062) from which the term sealioning originates

Sealioning (also sea-lioning and sea lioning) is a type of trolling or harassment that consists of pursuing people with relentless requests for evidence, often tangential or previously addressed, while maintaining a pretense of civility and sincerity ("I'm just trying to have a debate"), and feigning ignorance of the subject matter. It may take the form of "incessant, bad-faith invitations to engage in debate", and has been likened to a denial-of-service attack targeted at human beings. The term originated with a 2014 strip of the webcomic Wondermark by David Malki, which The Independent called "the most apt description of Twitter you'll ever see".

== Description ==
The "sealioner" feigns ignorance and politeness while making relentless demands for answers and evidence (while often ignoring or sidestepping any evidence their target has already presented), under the guise of "just trying to have a debate", so that when the target is eventually provoked into an angry response, the sealioner can act as the aggrieved party, and the target presented as closed-minded and unreasonable. Another maneuver of sealioning is the "Just Asking Questions" tactic, which frames false or misleading statements in the form of questions. Sealioning has been described as "incessant, bad-faith invitations to engage in debate". Sealioning can be performed by an individual or by a group acting in concert.

An essay in the collection Perspectives on Harmful Speech Online, published by the Berkman Klein Center for Internet & Society at Harvard, noted:

Rhetorically, sealioning fuses persistent questioning—often about basic information, information easily found elsewhere, or unrelated or tangential points—with a loudly-insisted-upon commitment to reasonable debate. It disguises itself as a sincere attempt to learn and communicate. Sealioning thus works both to exhaust a target's patience, attention, and communicative effort, and to portray the target as unreasonable. While the questions of the "sea lion" may seem innocent, they're intended maliciously and have harmful consequences.

— Amy Johnson, Berkman Klein Center for Internet & Society (May 2019)

American academic philosopher Walter Sinnott-Armstrong discussed the term in his book Think Again: How to Reason and Argue, saying:

Internet trolls sometimes engage in what is called 'sealioning'. They demand that you keep arguing with them for as long they want you to, even long after you realize that further discussion is pointless. If you announce that you want to stop, they accuse you of being closed-minded or opposed to reason. The practice is obnoxious. Reason should not be silenced, but it needs to take a vacation sometimes.

— Walter Sinnott-Armstrong, Think Again: How to Reason and Argue (June 2018).

Several other academics link or directly describe sealioning as a technique employed by internet trolls.

In December 2020, the Merriam-Webster Online Dictionary listed the term as "Words We're Watching", being "words we are increasingly seeing in use but that have not yet met our criteria for entry":

What is Sealioning: 'Sealioning' is a form of trolling meant to exhaust the other debate participant with no intention of real discourse.

In 2021, Canadian magazine Maclean's praised the Merriam-Webster definition saying, "This neologism on Merriam-Webster's list of words to watch aptly describes the frustration of conversing online".

=== Comparisons ===
The technique of sealioning has been compared to the Gish gallop and metaphorically described as a denial-of-service attack targeted at human beings (i.e., overloading a target with questions).

In 2022, English philosopher and academic Sophie Grace Chappell likened sealioning to the Socratic term eirōneíā (from which the word irony is derived but with a different end meaning), which she described as an insincere pretense of ignorance as a way to disassemble an argument, saying "[i]n contemporary internet slang, eironeia is «sealioning»."

== Origins and history ==
Use of the term originates from a 19 September 2014 strip of the webcomic Wondermark by David Malki titled The Terrible Sea Lion, where a character expresses a dislike of sea lions and a sea lion intrudes to repeatedly ask her to explain her statement and attempts (in an exaggeratedly civil manner) to interrogate her views, even following the characters into the privacy of their own home. "Sea lion" was quickly verbed, and noting this, Malki posted on his own Wondermark site, "I'm happy that it's resonated with so many people".

Malki later commented, regarding objections he had received to the strip, "It has been suggested that the couple in this comic, and the woman in particular, are bigots for making a pejorative statement about a species of animal, and then refusing to justify their statements. ... But often, in satire such as this, elements are employed to stand in for other, different objects or concepts. Using animals for this purpose has the effect of allowing the point (which usually is about behavior) to stand unencumbered by the connotations that might be suggested if a person is portrayed in that role .... The sea lion character ... is meant as a metaphorical stand-in for human beings that display certain behaviors. Since behaviors are the result of choice, I would assert that the woman's objection to sea lions—which, if the metaphor is understood, is read as actually an objection to human beings who exhibit certain behaviors—is not analogous to a prejudice based on race, species, or other immutable characteristics."

In 2014, Dina Rickman of the online version of The Independent said of Malki's strip, "This comic is the most apt description of Twitter you'll ever see".

The term gained popularity as a way to describe a specific type of online trolling, and it was used to describe some of the behavior of those participating in the Gamergate harassment campaign.

In a 2016 study published in First Monday focusing on users of the Gamergate subreddit /r/KotakuInAction, participants were surveyed about what they believed constituted "harassment". Participants were quoted stating that "expressions of sincere disagreement" were considered harassment by opponents of the forum and that the term sealioning was used to silence legitimate requests for proof.

In 2021, Maclean's compared its origination to other terms derived from comic strips that became common speech such as Brainiac (1958 comic book) and Milquetoast (from the 1924 comic strip). Maclean's noted that Malki had mixed feelings about the term, quoting him as saying: "I didn't set out to coin a phrase. I just wanted to make an observation", and "The core of what I set out to criticize is just the notion that any random patient stranger should feel entitled to as much of someone's attention as they want".

== See also ==
- Argumentum ad nauseam – a more general term for an argument that has continued past the point of value
- Brandolini's law
- Griefer
