= Jonathan Schaffer =

American philosopher

- Born: Jonathan Moshe Schaffer

Education
- Education: Kenyon College (BA); Rutgers University (PhD)
- Thesis: Causation and the Probabilities of Processes (1999)
- Doctoral advisor: Brian P. McLaughlin
- Other advisors: Barry Loewer; Tim Maudlin

Philosophical work
- Era: Contemporary philosophy
- Region: Western philosophy
- School: Analytic philosophy
- Institutions: Rutgers University
- Main interests: Metaphysics; Metaontology
- Notable ideas: Priority monism Argument from gunk

Jonathan Moshe Schaffer is an American philosopher specializing in metaphysics and also working in epistemology, mind, and language. He is best known for his work on grounding and his development of monism, and is also a notable proponent of contrastivism.

== Career ==
Since earning his PhD from Rutgers University in 1999, Schaffer has published 73 papers. He wrote his PhD thesis Causation and the Probabilities of Processes under Brian McLaughlin. In 2000, he accepted a position as assistant professor at the University of Massachusetts Amherst in Amherst, Massachusetts, earning tenure by 2004. In that period he was awarded the Philosophy of Science Recent PhD Essay Contest in 2001, and the Young Epistemologist Prize in 2002.

In 2007, Schaffer accepted a permanent research position at the Australian National University, and was described as "one of philosophy's most creative and interesting younger figures". He subsequently won awards for two papers published that year, the American Philosophical Association's 2008 Article Prize, for "Knowing the Answer" in Philosophy and Phenomenological Research, and the Australasian Journal of Philosophy's 2008 Best Paper Award, for "From Nihilism to Monism".

In 2010, Schaffer accepted a permanent position at Rutgers University. In 2014 he was awarded the Lebowitz Prize for excellence in philosophical thought by Phi Beta Kappa in conjunction with the American Philosophical Association. In 2015 he was promoted to Distinguished Professor, and from 2016 to 2019 he had a Humboldt Prize.

== Philosophical work ==
=== Metaontology ===
Schaffer advocates a neo-Aristotelian approach to metaontology in which composite objects, abstract objects, fictional characters, and many other philosophically contentious entities exist. Rather than debating such objects' existence, the primary role of metaphysics is to organize all existent entities into a hierarchical dependence structure. Within this structure, all existing things are classified as fundamental entities, derivative entities, or grounding relations.

Fundamental entities (also called substances) have nothing ontologically prior to them upon which their existence depends. They are the most basic units of existence. derivative entities, on the other hand, depend upon other entities for their existence. Schaffer uses the holes in a block of Swiss Cheese as an example of a derivative entity, since the holes are ontologically dependent upon the cheese. A derivative entity may be grounded in either another derivative entity or in a substance. A grounding relation is a primitive relation of dependence that holds between a derivative entity and that entity's "grounds". Grounding relations are irreflexive, asymmetric, and transitive. This allows for chains of grounding. Schaffer asserts that all chains of grounding must terminate in a fundamental entity in his "well-foundedness" assumption.

=== Priority monism ===
Schaffer is perhaps most well known for his arguments in favor of priority monism. Priority monism is a form of monism that claims that while very many entities exist, only one is fundamental. For Schaffer, this entity is the cosmos. Schaffer's position is motivated by his belief that the whole universe may be an entangled system and thus have properties that are not reducible to the universe's parts. "Monism: The Priority of the Whole" also contains his argument from gunk, according to which mereological atoms cannot be fundamental due to the possibility of infinitely divisible matter.
