= Internal–external distinction =

Concept in ontology

The internal–external distinction is a distinction used in philosophy to divide an ontology into two parts: trivial internal questions and meaningless external questions.

== Linguistic framework ==
Rudolf Carnap introduced the idea of a 'linguistic framework' or a 'form of language' that uses a precise specification of the definitions of and the relations between ontological entities. The discussion of a proposition within a framework can take on a logical or an empirical (that is, factual) aspect. The logical aspect concerns whether the proposition respects the definitions and rules set up in the framework. The empirical aspect concerns the application of the framework in some or another practical situation.

“If someone wishes to speak in his language about a new kind of entities, he has to introduce a system of new ways of speaking, subject to new rules; we shall call this procedure the construction of a linguistic framework for the new entities in question.”

— Rudolf Carnap, "Empiricism, Semantics, and Ontology"

“After the new forms are introduced into the language, it is possible to formulate with their help internal questions and possible answers to them. A question of this kind may be either empirical or logical; accordingly a true answer is either factually true or analytic.”

— Rudolf Carnap, "Empiricism, Semantics, and Ontology"

The utility of a linguistic framework constitutes issues that Carnap calls 'external' or 'pragmatic'.

“To be sure, we have to face at this point an important question; but it is a practical, not a theoretical question; it is the question of whether or not to accept the new linguistic forms. The acceptance cannot be judged as being either true or false because it is not an assertion. It can only be judged as being more or less expedient, fruitful, conducive to the aim for which the language is intended. Judgments of this kind supply the motivation for the decision of accepting or rejecting the kind of entities.”

— Rudolf Carnap, "Empiricism, Semantics, and Ontology"

“the decisive question is not the alleged ontological question of the existence of abstract entities but rather the question whether the rise of abstract linguistic forms or, in technical terms, the use of variables beyond those for things (or phenomenal data), is expedient and fruitful for the purposes for which semantical analyses are made, viz. the analysis, interpretation, clarification, or construction of languages of communication, especially languages of science.”

— Rudolf Carnap, "Empiricism, Semantics, and Ontology"

The distinction between 'internal' and 'external' arguments is not as obvious as it might appear. For example, discussion of the imaginary unit √−1 might be an internal question framed in the language of complex numbers about the correct usage of √−1, or it might be a question about the utility of complex numbers: whether there is any practical advantage in using √−1. Clearly the question of utility is not completely separable from the way a linguistic framework is organized. A more formal statement of the internal-external difference is provided by Myhill:

"A question...is internal relative to [a linguistic framework] T if the asker accepts T at the time of his asking, and is prepared to use T in order to obtain an answer; external otherwise, in particular if the question is part of a chain of reflections and discussions aimed at choosing between T and some rival theory."

— John R Myhill, Review of W. V. Quine: "On Carnap's Views on Ontology"

== Quine's critique ==
Quine disputed Carnap's position from several points of view. His most famous criticism of Carnap was Two dogmas of empiricism, but this work is not directed at the internal-external distinction but at the analytic–synthetic distinction brought up by Carnap in his work on logic: Meaning and Necessity. Quine's criticism of the internal-external distinction is found in his works On Carnap's views on Ontology and Word and Object.

Quine's approach to the internal-external division was to cast internal questions as subclass questions and external questions as category questions. What Quine meant by 'subclass' questions were questions like "what are so-and-so's?" where the answers are restricted to lie within a specific linguistic framework. On the other hand, 'category' questions were questions like "what are so-and-so's?" asked outside any specific language where the answers are not so-restricted. The term subclass arises as follows: Quine supposes that a particular linguistic framework selects from a broad category of meanings for a term, say furniture, a particular or subclass of meanings, say chairs.

Quine argued that there is always possible an overarching language that encompasses both types of question and the distinction between the two types is artificial.

It is evident that the question whether there are numbers will be a category question only with respect to languages which appropriate a separate style of variables for the exclusive purpose of referring to numbers. If our language refers to numbers through variables that also take classes other than numbers as values, then the question whether there are numbers becomes a subclass question...Even the question whether there are classes, or whether there are physical objects becomes a subclass question if our language uses a single style of variables to range over both sorts of entities. Whether the statement that there are physical objects and the statement that there are black swans should be put on the same side of the dichotomy, or on opposite sides, comes to depend upon the rather trivial consideration of whether we use one style of variables or two for physical objects and classes.

— Willard Van Orman Quine, Carnap's views on ontology

So we can switch back and forth from internal to external questions just by a shift of vocabulary. As Thomasson puts it, if our language refers to 'things' we can ask of all the things there are, are any of them numbers; while if our language includes only 'numbers', we can ask only narrower questions like whether any numbers are prime numbers. In other words, Quine's position is that "Carnap's main objection to metaphysics rests on an unsupported premise, namely the assumption that there is some sort of principled plurality in language which blocks Quine's move to homogenize the existential quantifier." "What is to stop us treating all ontological issues as internal questions within a single grand framework?"

== Later views ==
A view close to Quine’s subclass/category description is called ‘’conceptual relativity’’. To describe conceptual relativity, Putnam points out that while the pages of a book are regarded as part of book when they are attached, they are things-in-themselves if they are detached. My nose is only part of an object, my person. On the other hand, is my nose the same as the collection of atoms or molecules forming it? This arbitrariness of language is called conceptual relativity, a matter of conventions. The point is made that if one wishes to refer only to 'pages', then books may not exist, and vice versa if one wishes to admit only to books. Thus, in this view, the Carnapian multiplicity of possible linguistic frameworks proposes a variety of 'realities' and the prospect of choosing between them, a form of what is called ontological pluralism, or multiple realities. The notion of 'one reality' behind our everyday perceptions is common in everyday life, and some find it unsettling that what 'exists' might be a matter of what language one chooses to use.

A related idea is quantifier variance. Loosely speaking a 'quantifier expression' is just a function that says there exists at least one such-and-such. Then 'quantifier variance' combines the notion that the same object can have different names, so the quantifier may refer to the same thing even though different names are employed by it, and the notion that quantifier expressions can be formed in a variety of ways. Hirsch says this arbitrariness over what 'exists' is a quandary only due to Putnam's formulation, and it is resolved by turning things upside down and saying things that exist can have different names. In other words, Hirsch agrees with Quine that there is an overarching language that we can adapt to different situations. The Carnapian internal/external distinction in this view, as with the subclass/category distinction, is just a matter of language, and has nothing to do with 'reality'.

More recently, some philosophers have stressed that the real issue is not one of language as such, but the difference between questions asked using a linguistic framework and those asked somehow before the adoption of a linguistic framework, the difference between questions about the construction and rules of a framework, and questions about the decision whether to use a framework. This distinction is called by Thomasson and Price the difference between ‘’using’’ a term and ‘’mentioning’’ a term. As Price notes, Carnap holds that there is a mistake involved in "assimilating issues of the existence of numbers (say) and of the existence of physical objects...the distinctions in question are not grounded at the syntactical level." Price suggests a connection with Ryle's view of different functions of language:

Ryle's functional orientation attention – his attention to the question as to what a linguistic category does – will instead lead us to focus on the difference between the functions of talk of beliefs and talk of tables; on the issue of what the two kinds of talk are for, rather than that of what they are about.

— Huw Price, Metaphysics after Carnap: The ghost who walks, p. 331

Although not supporting an entire lack of distinction like the subclass/category view of Quine, as a pragmatic issue, the use/mention distinction still does not provide a sharp division between the issues of forming and conceptualizing a framework and deciding whether to adopt it: each informs the other. An example is the well-known tension between mathematicians and physicists, the one group very concerned over questions of logic and rigor, and the other inclined to sacrifice a bit of rigor to explain observations.

But the poor mathematician translates it into equations, and as the symbols do not mean anything to him he has no guide but precise mathematical rigor and care in the argument. The physicist, who knows more or less how the answer is going to come out, can sort of guess part way, and so go along rather rapidly. The mathematical rigor of great precision is not very useful in physics. But one should not criticize the mathematicians on this score...They are doing their own job.

— Richard Feynman, The Character of Physical Law, pp. 56–57

One approach to selecting a framework is based upon an examination of the conceptual relations between entities in a framework, which entities are more 'fundamental'. One framework may then 'include' another because the entities in one framework apparently can be derived from or 'supervene' upon those in the more fundamental one. While Carnap claims such decisions are pragmatic in nature, external questions with no philosophical importance, Schaffer suggests avoiding this formulation. Instead, go back to Aristotle and look upon nature as hierarchical, and pursue philosophical diagnostics: that is, examination of criteria for what is fundamental and what relations exist between all entities and these fundamental ones. But "how can we discover what grounds what?...questions regarding not only what grounds what, but also what the grounding consists in, and how one may discover or discern grounding facts, seem to be part of an emerging set of relational research problems in metaphysics."

== See also ==
- Analytic–synthetic distinction
- Anti-realism
- Indeterminacy of translation
- Internalism and externalism
- Logical positivism
- Meta-ontology
- Mereology
- Model-dependent realism
- Ordinary language philosophy
- Philosophical realism
- Vertiginous question
