= Personology =

Personology may refer to:

- A theory of personality psychology advanced by Henry Murray and others
- Physiognomy, the assessment of a person's character or personality from outer appearance, especially the face
