= Monism =

Philosophical view that everything in reality is ultimately one kind of thing

The circled dot was used by the Pythagoreans and later Greeks to represent the first metaphysical being, the Monad or The Absolute.

Monism attributes oneness or singleness (Greek: μόνος) to a concept, such as existence. Primarily used in philosophy, the term sometimes overlaps with nondualism. Various kinds of monism can be distinguished:

- Priority monism states that all existing things go back to a source that is distinct from them; e.g., in Neoplatonism everything is derived from the One. In this view, only the One is ontologically fundamental or prior to everything else.
- Existence monism posits that, strictly speaking, there exists only a single thing, the universe, which can only be artificially and arbitrarily divided into many things.
- Substance monism asserts that a variety of existing things can be explained in terms of a single reality or substance. Substance monism posits that only one kind of substance exists, although many things may be made up of this substance, e.g., matter or mind.
- Dual-aspect monism is the view that the mental and the physical are two aspects of, or perspectives on, the same substance.
- Neutral monism believes the fundamental nature of reality to be neither mental nor physical; in other words it is "neutral".
- Political monism is sometimes used to describe political concepts, such as unitarianism, based on certain principles like ethnicity or identity.

== Definitions ==
There are two sorts of definitions for monism:

- The wide definition: a philosophy is monistic if it postulates unity of the origin of all things; all existing things return to a source that is distinct from them.
- The restricted definition: this requires not only unity of origin but also unity of substance and essence.

Although the term monism is derived from Western philosophy to typify positions in the mind–body problem, it has also been used to typify religious traditions. In modern Hinduism, the term "absolute monism" has been applied to Advaita Vedanta, though Philip Renard points out that this may be a Western interpretation, bypassing the intuitive understanding of a nondual reality. It is more generally categorized by scholars as a form of absolute nondualism.

== History ==
Material monism can be traced back to the pre-Socratic philosophers who sought to understand the arche or basic principle of the universe in terms of different material causes. These included Thales, who argued that the basis of everything was water, Anaximenes, who claimed it was air, and Heraclitus, who believed it to be fire. Later, Parmenides described the world as "One", which could not change in any way. Zeno of Elea defended this view of everything being a single entity through his paradoxes, which aim to show the existence of time, motion and space to be illusionary.

Baruch Spinoza argued that 'God or Nature' (Deus sive Natura) is the only substance of the universe, which can be referred to as either 'God' or 'Nature' (the two being interchangeable). This is because God/Nature has all the possible attributes and no two substances can share an attribute, which means there can be no other substances than God/Nature.

Monism has been discussed thoroughly in Indian philosophy and Vedanta throughout their history starting as early as the Rig Veda. The term monism was introduced in the 18th century by Christian von Wolff in his work Logic (1728), to designate types of philosophical thought in which the attempt was made to eliminate the dichotomy of body and mind and explain all phenomena by one unifying principle, or as manifestations of a single substance.

The mind–body problem in philosophy examines the relationship between mind and matter, and in particular the relationship between consciousness and the brain. The problem was addressed by René Descartes in the 17th century, resulting in Cartesian dualism, and by pre-Aristotelian philosophers, in Avicennian philosophy, and in earlier Asian and more specifically Indian traditions.

Monism was later also applied to the theory of absolute identity set forth by Hegel and Schelling. Thereafter the term was more broadly used for any theory postulating a unifying principle. The opponent thesis of dualism also was broadened, to include pluralism. According to Urmson, as a result of this extended use, the term is "systematically ambiguous".

According to Jonathan Schaffer, monism lost popularity due to the emergence of analytic philosophy in the early twentieth century, which revolted against the neo-Hegelians. Rudolf Carnap and A. J. Ayer, who were strong proponents of positivism, "ridiculed the whole question as incoherent mysticism".

The mind–body problem has reemerged in social psychology and related fields, with the interest in mind–body interaction and the rejection of Cartesian mind–body dualism in the identity thesis, a modern form of monism. Monism is also still relevant to the philosophy of mind, where various positions are defended.

== Types ==
A diagram with neutral monism compared to Cartesian dualism, physicalism and idealism

Different types of monism include:

- Substance monism, "the view that the apparent plurality of substances is due to different states or appearances of a single substance"
- Attributive monism, "the view that whatever the number of substances, they are of a single ultimate kind"
- Epistemological monism, where "ultimately, everything that can be thought, observed and engaged, shares one conceptual system of interaction, however complex."
- Partial monism, "within a given realm of being (however many there may be) there is only one substance"
- Existence monism, "the view that there is only one concrete object token (The One, "Τὸ Ἕν" or the Monad)"
- Priority monism, "the whole is prior to its parts" or "the world has parts, but the parts are dependent fragments of an integrated whole"
- Property monism, "the view that all properties are of a single type (e.g., only physical properties exist)"
- Genus monism, "the doctrine that there is a highest category; e.g., being"

Views contrasting with monism are:

- Metaphysical dualism, which asserts that there are two ultimately irreconcilable substances or realities such as Good and Evil, for example, Gnosticism and Manichaeism.
- Metaphysical pluralism, which asserts three or more fundamental substances or realities.
- Metaphysical nihilism, negates any of the above categories (substances, properties, concrete objects, etc.).

Monism in modern philosophy of mind can be divided into three broad categories:

- Idealist, mentalistic monism, which holds that only mind or spirit exists.
- Neutral monism, which holds that one sort of thing fundamentally exists, to which both the mental and the physical can be reduced
- Material monism (also called Physicalism and materialism), which holds that the material world is primary, and consciousness arises through the interaction with the material world
- Eliminative materialism, according to which everything is physical and mental things do not exist
- Reductive physicalism, according to which mental things do exist and are a kind of physical thing (Note: Such as Behaviourism, Type-identity theory and Functionalism)

Certain positions do not fit easily into the above categories, such as functionalism, anomalous monism, and reflexive monism. Moreover, they do not define the meaning of "real".

== Monistic philosophers ==
=== Pre-Socratic ===
While the lack of information makes it difficult in some cases to be sure of the details, the following pre-Socratic philosophers thought in monistic terms:

- Thales: Water
- Anaximander: Apeiron (meaning 'the undefined infinite'). Reality is some, one thing, but we cannot know what.
- Anaximenes of Miletus: Air
- Heraclitus: Change, symbolized by fire (in that everything is in constant flux).
- Parmenides: Being or Reality is an unmoving perfect sphere, unchanging, undivided.

=== Post-Socrates ===
- Neopythagorians such as Apollonius of Tyana centered their cosmologies on the Monad or One.
- Stoics taught that there is only one substance, identified as God.
- Middle Platonism under such works as those by Numenius taught that the Universe emanates from the Monad or One.
- Neoplatonism is monistic. Plotinus taught that there was an ineffable transcendent god, 'The One', of which subsequent realities were emanations. From The One emanates the Divine Mind (Nous), the Cosmic Soul (Psyche), and the World (Cosmos).

=== Modern ===
- Alexander Bogdanov
- F. H. Bradley
- Giordano Bruno
- Gilles Deleuze
- Friedrich Engels
- Johann Gottlieb Fichte
- Ernst Haeckel
- David Bentley Hart
- Georg Wilhelm Friedrich Hegel
- Christopher Langan
- Giacomo Leopardi
- Ernst Mach
- Karl Marx
- Wilhelm Ostwald
- Charles Sanders Peirce
- Georgi Plekhanov
- Gilbert Ryle
- Jonathan Schaffer
- Friedrich Wilhelm Joseph Schelling
- Hans Jonas
- Arthur Schopenhauer
- Rupert Sheldrake
- B. F. Skinner
- Herbert Spencer
- Baruch Spinoza
- Rudolf Steiner
- Alan Watts
- Alfred North Whitehead

== Monistic neuroscientists ==
- György Buzsáki
- Francis Crick
- Karl Friston
- Eric Kandel
- Mark Solms
- Rodolfo Llinas
- Ivan Pavlov
- Roger Sperry

== Religion ==
=== Pantheism ===
Pantheism is the belief that everything composes an all-encompassing, immanent God, or that the universe (or nature) is identical with divinity. Pantheists thus do or do not believe in a personal or anthropomorphic god, but believe that interpretations of the term differ.

Pantheism was popularized in the modern era as both a theology and philosophy based on the work of the 17th-century philosopher Baruch Spinoza, whose Ethics was an answer to Descartes' famous dualist theory that the body and spirit are separate. Spinoza held that the two are the same, and this monism is a fundamental quality of his philosophy. He was described as a "God-intoxicated man," and used the word God to describe the unity of all substance. Although the term pantheism was not coined until after his death, Spinoza is regarded as its most celebrated advocate.

H. P. Owen claimed that

Pantheists are "monists" ... they believe that there is only one Being, and that all other forms of reality are either modes (or appearances) of it or identical with it.

Pantheism is closely related to monism, as pantheists also believe that all of reality is one substance, called the Universe, God, or Nature. Panentheism, a slightly different concept, is explained below in the next section. Some of the most famous pantheists are the Stoics, Giordano Bruno and Spinoza.

=== Panentheism ===
Panentheism (from Greek πᾶν (pân) "all"; ἐν (en) "in"; and θεός (theós) "God"; "all-in-God") is a belief system that posits that the divine (be it a monotheistic God, polytheistic gods, or an eternal cosmic animating force) interpenetrates every part of nature, but is not one with nature. Panentheism differentiates itself from pantheism, which holds that the divine is synonymous with the universe.

In panentheism, there are two types of substance: "pan," the universe, and God. The universe and the divine are not ontologically equivalent. God is viewed as the eternal animating force within the universe. In some forms of panentheism, the cosmos exists within God, who in turn "transcends", "pervades" or is "in" the cosmos.

While pantheism asserts that 'All is God', panentheism claims that God animates all of the universe, and also transcends the universe. In addition, some forms indicate that the universe is contained within God, as in the Judaic concept of Tzimtzum. Much Hindu thought is highly characterized by panentheism and pantheism.

Paul Tillich has argued for such a concept within Christian theology, as has liberal biblical scholar Marcus Borg and mystical theologian Matthew Fox, an Episcopal priest. (Note: See Creation Spirituality)

=== Pandeism ===
Pandeism or pan-deism (from Ancient Greek: πᾶν, romanized: pan, lit. 'all' and Latin: deus meaning "god" in the sense of deism) is a term describing beliefs coherently incorporating or mixing logically reconcilable elements of pantheism (that "God", or a metaphysically equivalent creator deity, is identical to Nature) and classical deism (that the creator-god who designed the universe no longer exists in a status where it can be reached, and can instead be confirmed only by reason). It is therefore, most particularly, the belief that the creator of the universe actually became the universe and thus ceased to exist as a separate entity.

Through this synergy, pandeism claims to answer primary objections to deism (why would God create and then not interact with the universe?) and to pantheism (how did the universe originate and what is its purpose?).

=== Indian and East Asian religions ===
==== Characteristics ====
The central problem in Asian (religious) philosophy is not the body-mind problem, but the search for an unchanging Real or Absolute beyond the world of appearances and changing phenomena, and the search for liberation from dukkha and the liberation from the cycle of rebirth. In Hinduism, substance-ontology prevails, seeing Brahman as the unchanging reality beyond the world of appearances. In Buddhism, process ontology is prevalent, seeing reality as empty of an unchanging essence.

Characteristic for various Asian philosophy, technology and religions is the discernment of levels of truth, an emphasis on intuitive-experiential understanding of the Absolute such as jnana, bodhi and jianxing: (Chinese; 見性), and the technology of yin and yang used within East Asian medicine with an emphasis on the integration of these levels of truth and its understanding.

==== Hinduism ====
===== Vedanta =====
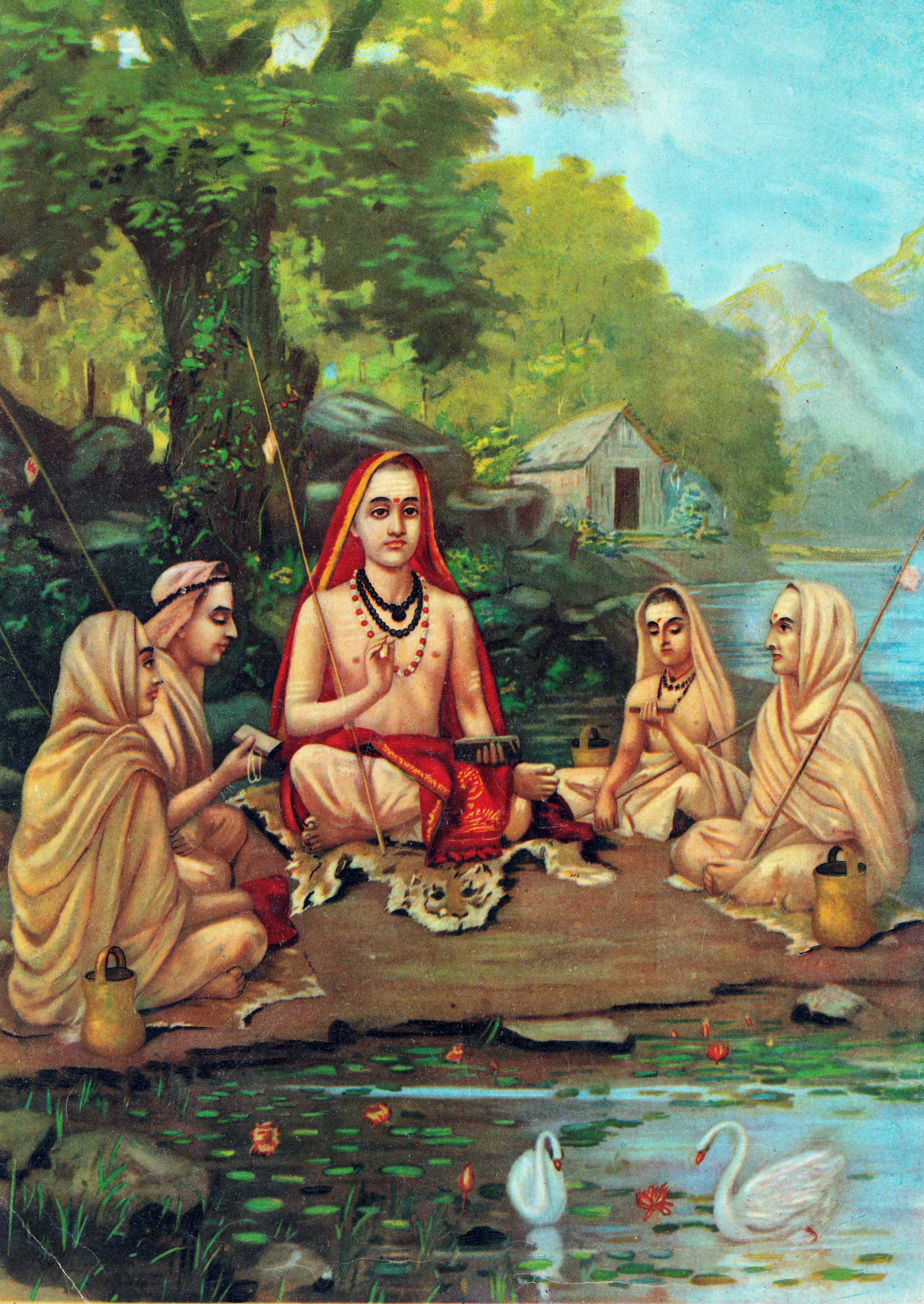
Adi Shankara with Disciples, by Raja Ravi Varma (1904)

Vedanta is the inquiry into and systematisation of the Vedas and Upanishads, to harmonise the various and contrasting ideas that can be found in those texts. Within Vedanta, different schools exist:

- Vishishtadvaita, qualified monism, is from the school of Ramanuja;
- Shuddhadvaita, in-essence monism, is the school of Vallabha;
- Dvaitadvaita, differential monism, is a school founded by Nimbarka;
- Achintya Bheda Abheda, a school of Vedanta founded by Chaitanya Mahaprabhu representing the philosophy of inconceivable one-ness and difference. It can be understood as an integration of the strict dualist (dvaita) theology of Madhvacharya and the qualified monism (vishishtadvaita) of Ramanuja.

===== Modern Hinduism =====
The colonisation of India by the British had a major impact on Hindu society. In response, leading Hindu intellectuals began studying Western culture and philosophy, integrating several Western notions into Hinduism. This modernised Hinduism, in turn, has gained popularity in the West.

A major role was played in the 19th century by Swami Vivekananda in the revival of Hinduism, and the spread of Advaita Vedanta to the west via the Ramakrishna Mission. His interpretation of Advaita Vedanta has been called Neo-Vedanta. In Advaita, Shankara suggests meditation and Nirvikalpa Samadhi are means to gain knowledge of the already existing unity of Brahman and Atman, not the highest goal itself:

[Y]oga is a meditative exercise of withdrawal from the particular and identification with the universal, leading to contemplation of oneself as the most universal, namely, Consciousness. This approach is different from the classical Yoga of complete thought suppression.

Vivekananda, according to Gavin Flood, was "a figure of great importance in the development of a modern Hindu self-understanding and in formulating the West's view of Hinduism." Central to his philosophy is the idea that the divine exists in all beings, that all human beings can achieve union with this "innate divinity", and that seeing this divine as the essence of others will further love and social harmony. According to Vivekananda, there is an essential unity to Hinduism, which underlies the diversity of its many forms. According to Flood, Vivekananda's view of Hinduism is the most common among Hindus today. This monism, according to Flood, is at the foundation of earlier Upanishads, to theosophy in the later Vedanta tradition and in modern Neo-Hinduism.

==== Buddhism ====
According to the Pāli Canon, both pluralism (nānatta) and monism (ekatta) are speculative views. A Theravada commentary notes that the former is similar to or associated with nihilism (ucchēdavāda), and the latter is similar to or associated with eternalism (sassatavada).

===== Levels of truth =====
Within Buddhism, a wide variety of philosophical and pedagogical models can be found. Various schools of Buddhism discern levels of truth:

- The Two truths doctrine of the Madhyamaka
- The Three Natures of the Yogacara
- Essence-Function, or Absolute-relative in Chinese and Korean Buddhism
- The Trikaya-formule, consisting of
  - The Dharmakāya or Truth body which embodies the very principle of enlightenment and knows no limits or boundaries;
  - The Sambhogakāya or body of mutual enjoyment which is a body of bliss or clear light manifestation;
  - The Nirmāṇakāya or created body which manifests in time and space.

The Prajnaparamita-sutras and Madhyamaka emphasize the non-duality of form and emptiness: "form is emptiness, emptiness is form", as the Heart Sutra says. In Chinese Buddhism, this was understood to mean that ultimate reality is not a transcendental realm but is equal to the daily world of relative reality. This idea was well-situated for the existing Chinese culture, which emphasized the mundane world and society. But this does not tell how the absolute is present in the relative world:

To deny the duality of samsara and nirvana, as the Perfection of Wisdom does, or to demonstrate logically the error of dichotomizing conceptualization, as Nagarjuna does, is not to address the question of the relationship between samsara and nirvana -or, in more philosophical terms, between phenomenal and ultimate reality [...] What, then, is the relationship between these two realms?

This question is answered in such schemata as the Five Ranks of Tozan, the Oxherding Pictures, and Hakuin's Four ways of knowing.

The Lotus Sutra emphasizes the "One Vehicle" teaching that one who attains Supreme Awakening to the Wonderful Dharma sees that the phenomenal, emptiness, and the ultimate are non-dual, yet such Awakening cannot be expressed in words. For this reason, the Buddha employs innumerable skillful and expedient means depending on different people's capacity to embrace the teachings.

The Tiantai school articulated the concept of "three thousand worlds in one thought moment", which categorizes existence into ten worlds: hell dwellers, hungry ghosts, beasts, asuras, humans, gods (devas), sravakas (voice hearers or disciples), pratyekabuddhas (solitary contemplatives or "private buddhas"), bodhisattvas and Buddhas. According to Zhiyi, each of these ten worlds mutually includes all of the others, resulting in 100 worlds. Each of these 100 worlds share the characteristics of the "ten suchnesses", taken from Chapter 2 of Kumarajiva's translation of the Lotus Sutra: suchness of the dharmas, the suchness of their marks, the suchness of their nature, the suchness of their substance, the suchness of their powers, the suchness of their functions, the suchness of their causes, the suchness of their conditions, the suchness of their effects, the suchness of their retributions, and the absolute identity of their beginning and end. This multiplies the states of existence to 1000, which manifest in three spheres of existence: sentient beings, the environment in which they live, and the five skandhas: form, sensation, perception, mental activity, and consciousness. These 3000 worlds are all manifested in a single thought moment. Nichiren Buddhists take three thousand worlds in one thought moment to be the essence of the Buddha's teaching, based on the Buddha's revelation in Chapter 16 of the Lotus Sutra that the Buddha, the Sangha, and the Pure Land are eternally present in this world of endurance, and are not otherworldly or apart from it, hence nondual.

==== Sikhism ====
Sikhism aligns with the concept of Absolute Monism. Sikh philosophy advocates that only God is the ultimate reality. Forms, being subject to time, shall pass away. God's Reality alone is eternal and abiding. The thought is that Atma (soul) is born from, and a reflection of, ParamAtma (Supreme Soul), and "will again merge into it", in the words of the fifth guru of Sikhs, Guru Arjan, "just as water merges back into the water."

God and Soul are fundamentally the same; identical in the same way as Fire and its sparks. "Atam meh Ram, Ram meh Atam" which means "The Ultimate Eternal reality resides in the Soul and the Soul is contained in Him". As from one stream, millions of waves arise and yet the waves, made of water, again become water; in the same way all souls have sprung from the Universal Being and would blend again into it.

=== Abrahamic faiths ===
==== Judaism ====
Jewish thought considers God as separate from all physical, created things and as existing outside of time. (Note: For a discussion of the resultant paradox, see Tzimtzum.) (Note: See also Negative theology.)

According to Maimonides, God is an incorporeal being that caused all other existence; to admit corporeality to God is tantamount to admitting complexity to God, which is a contradiction to God as the first cause and constitutes heresy. While Hasidic mystics considered the existence of the physical world a contradiction to God's simpleness, Maimonides saw no contradiction. (Note: See the "Guide for the Perplexed", especially chapter I:50.)

According to Hasidic thought (particularly as propounded by the 18th century, early 19th-century founder of Chabad, Shneur Zalman of Liadi), God is held to be immanent within creation for two interrelated reasons:

1. A very strong Jewish belief is that "[t]he Divine life-force which brings [the universe] into existence must constantly be present ... were this life-force to forsake [the universe] for even one brief moment, it would revert to a state of utter nothingness, as before the creation ..."
2. Simultaneously, Judaism holds as axiomatic that God is an absolute unity, and that he is perfectly simple; thus, if his sustaining power is within nature, then his essence is also within nature.{{}}

==== Christianity ====
===== Creator–creature distinction =====
Christians maintain that God created the universe ex nihilo and not from his own substance, so that the creator is not to be confused with creation, but rather transcends it. There is a movement of "Christian Panentheism".

===== Rejection of radical dualism =====
In On Free Choice of the Will, Augustine argued, in the context of the problem of evil, that evil is not the opposite of good, but rather merely the absence of good, something that does not have existence in itself. Likewise, C. S. Lewis described evil as a "parasite" in Mere Christianity, as he viewed evil as something that cannot exist without good to provide it with existence. Lewis went on to argue against dualism from the basis of moral absolutism, and rejected the dualistic notion that God and Satan are opposites, arguing instead that God has no equal, hence no opposite. Lewis rather viewed Satan as the opposite of Michael the Archangel. As a result, Lewis instead argued for a more limited form of dualism. Other theologians, such as Greg Boyd, have argued in more depth that the Biblical authors held a "limited dualism", meaning that God and Satan do engage in real battle, but only due to free will given by God, for the duration that God allows.

===== Mormonism =====
Latter Day Saint theology also expresses a form of dual-aspect monism via materialism and eternalism, claiming that creation was ex materia (as opposed to ex nihilo in conventional Christianity), as expressed by Parley Pratt and echoed in view by the movement's founder Joseph Smith, making no distinction between the spiritual and the material, these being not just similarly eternal, but ultimately two manifestations of the same reality or substance.

Parley Pratt implies a vitalism paired with evolutionary adaptation, noting, "these eternal, self-existing elements possess in themselves certain inherent properties or attributes, in a greater or less degree; or, in other words, they possess intelligence, adapted to their several spheres."

Parley Pratt's view is also similar to Gottfried Leibniz's monadology, which holds that "reality consists of mind atoms that are living centers of force."

Brigham Young anticipates a proto-mentality of elementary particles with his vitalist view, "there is life in all matter, throughout the vast extent of all the eternities; it is in the rock, the sand, the dust, in water, air, the gases, and in short, in every description and organization of matter; whether it be solid, liquid, or gaseous, particle operating with particle."

The LDS conception of matter is "essentially dynamic rather than static, if indeed it is not a kind of living energy, and that it is subject at least to the rule of intelligence."

John A. Widstoe held a similar, more vitalist view, that "Life is nothing more than matter in motion; that, therefore, all matter possess a kind of life... Matter... [is] intelligence... hence everything in the universe is alive." However, Widstoe resisted outright affirming a belief in panpsychism.

==== Islam ====
===== Quran =====
Vincent Cornell argues that the Quran presents a monist image of God by describing reality as a unified whole, with God as a single concept that encompasses all existing things.

But most argue that Abrahamic religious scriptures, especially the Quran, see creation and God as two separate existences. It explains that God has created everything and is under his control, but at the same time distinguishes creation as being dependent on the existence of God.

===== Sufism =====
Some Sufi mystics advocate monism. One of the most notable was the 13th-century Persian poet Rumi (1207–1273), who, in his didactic poem Masnavi, espoused monism. Rumi says in the Masnavi,

In the shop for Unity (wahdat); anything that you see there except the One is an idol.

Other Sufi mystics however, such as Ahmad Sirhindi, upheld dualistic Monotheism (the separation of God and the Universe).

The most influential of the Islamic monists was the Sufi philosopher Ibn Arabi (1165–1240). He developed the concept of 'unity of being' (Arabic: waḥdat al-wujūd), which some argue is a monistic philosophy. Born in al-Andalus, he made an enormous impact on the Muslim world, where he was crowned "the great Master". In the centuries following his death, his ideas became increasingly controversial. Ahmad Sirhindi criticised the monistic understanding of 'unity of being', advocating the dualistic-compatible 'unity of witness' (Arabic: wahdat ash-shuhud), maintaining separation of creator and creation. Later, Shah Waliullah Dehlawi reconciled the two ideas maintaining that their differences are semantic, arguing that the universal existence (which is different in creation to creator) and the divine essence are different and that the universal existence emanates (in a non-platonic sense) from the divine essence and that the relationship between them is similar to the relationship between the number four and a number being even.

===== Shi'ism =====
The doctrine of waḥdat al-wujūd also enjoys considerable following in the rationalist philosophy of Twelver Shi'ism, with the most famous modern-day adherent being Ruhollah Khomeini.

==== Baháʼí Faith ====
Although the teachings of the Baháʼí Faith have a strong emphasis on social and ethical issues, there exist a number of foundational texts that have been described as mystical. Some of these include statements of a monist nature (e.g., The Seven Valleys and the Hidden Words). The differences between dualist and monist views are reconciled by the teaching that these opposing viewpoints are caused by differences in the observers themselves, not in that which is observed. This is not a 'higher truth/lower truth' position. God is unknowable. For man it is impossible to acquire any direct knowledge of God or the Absolute, because any knowledge that one has, is relative.

== See also ==
- Cosmic pluralism
- Dialectical monism
- Henosis
- Holism
- Indefinite monism
- Neoplatonism
- Material monism
- Monadology
- Monistic idealism
- Ontological pluralism
- Priority monism
- Realistic monism
- Sikhism
- Taoism
- Univocity of being
- Wuji

== Sources ==
- Abernethy, George L; Langford, Thomas A. (1970), Introduction to Western Philosophy: pre-Socratics to Mill, Belmont, CA: Dickenson, ISBN 978-0-8221-0179-6
- Brugger, Walter, ed. (1972), Diccionario de Filosofía, Barcelona: Herder, art. dualismo, monismo, pluralismo
- Buswell, Robert E. Jr.; Gimello, Robert M., eds. (1994), Paths to Liberation. The Marga and its Transformations in Buddhist Thought, Delhi: Motilal Banarsidass Publishers, ISBN 978-8-1208-1197-3
- Chande, M.B. (2000), Indian Philosophy In Modern Times, Atlantic Publishers & Dist
- Comans, Michael (January 1993), "The Question of the Importance of Samadhi in Modern and Classical Advaita Vedanta", Philosophy East and West, 43 (1): 19–38, doi:10.2307/1399467, JSTOR 1399467, archived from the original on 2017-06-03
- Cross, F. L.; Livingstone, E. A. (1974), "monism", The Oxford Dictionary of the Christian Church, OUP
- Dasgupta, Surendranath (1992), A history of Indian philosophy part 1, Motilall Banarsidass
- Dense, Christian D. Von (1999), Philosophers and Religious Leaders, Greenwood Publishing Group
- Fiske, Susan T.; et al. (2010), Handbook of Social Psychology, vol. 1, John Wiley & Sons
- Flood, Gavin (1996), An Introduction to Hinduism, Cambridge University Press, ISBN 0-521-43878-0
- Hawley, michael (2006), Sarvepalli Radhakrishnan (1888–1975)
- Kalupahana, David J. (1992), The Principles of Buddhist Psychology, Delhi: ri Satguru Publications
- Kalupahana, David J. (1994), A history of Buddhist philosophy, Delhi: Motilal Banarsidass Publ.
- Kasulis, Thomas P. (2003), Takeuchi Yoshinori (ed.), "Ch'an Spirituality", Buddhist Spirituality. Later China, Korea, Japan and the Modern World, Delhi: Motilal Banarsidass
- Liang-Chieh (1986), The Record of Tung-shan, William F. Powell transl., Kuroda Institute
- Low, Albert (2006), Hakuin on Kensho. The Four Ways of Knowing, Boston & London: Shambhala
- Loy, David (1988), Nonduality: A Study in Comparative Philosophy, New Haven, Conn: Yale University Press, ISBN 1-57392-359-1
- Maezumi, Taizan; Glassman, Bernie (2007), The Hazy Moon of Enlightenment, Wisdom Publ
- Mandik, Pete (2010), Key Terms in Philosophy of Mind, Continuum International Publish.
- McLaughlin, Brian; et al. (2009), The Oxford Handbook of Philosophy of Mind, Oxford University Press
- Michaels, Axel (2004), Hinduism. Past and present, Princeton, New Jersey: Princeton University Press
- Mukerji, Mādhava Bithika (1983), Neo-Vedanta and Modernity, Ashutosh Prakashan Sansthan
- Nakamura, Hajime (1991), Ways of Thinking of Eastern Peoples: India, China, Tibet, Japan, Delhi: Motilal Banarsidass Publishers Private Limited, hdl:10125/23054
- Puligandla, Ramakrishna (1997), Fundamentals of Indian Philosophy, New Delhi: D.K. Printworld (P) Ltd.
- Rambachan, Anatanand (1994), The Limits of Scripture: Vivekananda's Reinterpretation of the Vedas, University of Hawaii Press
- Renard, Philip (1999), Ramana Upanishad: de verzamelde geschriften van Ramana Maharshi (in Dutch), Utrecht: Servire, ISBN 978-9021587448
- Schaffer, Jonathan (2010), "Monism: The Priority of the Whole" (PDF), Philosophical Review, 119 (1): 31–76), doi:10.1215/00318108-2009-025
- Sharf, Robert H. (1995), "Buddhist Modernism and the Rhetoric of Meditative Experience" (PDF), NUMEN, 42 (3): 228–283, doi:10.1163/1568527952598549, hdl:2027.42/43810, archived from the original (PDF) on 2019-04-12
- Urmson, James Opie (1991), The Concise Encyclopedia of Western Philosophy and Philosophers, Routledge
- Williams, Paul (1994), Mahayana Buddhism, Routledge, ISBN 0-415-02537-0
