= Julius Frauenstädt =

German philosopher and editor (1813–1879)

- Born: April 17, 1813; Bojanowo, Posen
- Died: January 13, 1879 (aged 65); Berlin, Germany
- Occupations: Philosopher and editor

Christian Martin Julius Frauenstädt (April 17, 1813, Bojanowo, Posen – January 13, 1879, Berlin) was a German philosopher and editor. He was educated at the house of his uncle at Neisse, and converted from Judaism to protestant Christianity in 1833. He studied theology and, later, philosophy at Berlin, where he came under the sway of the philosophies of Hegel and Schelling. He worked as a private tutor for the Sayn-Wittgenstein family during this period.

Frauenstädt met the philosopher Arthur Schopenhauer in the winter of 1846/47 in Frankfurt. He became a private lecturer and scholar in 1848 in Berlin, where he would become the primary editor and interpreter of Schopenhauer's philosophy.

Schopenhauer made Frauenstädt his literary executor to edit his works, calling him indefatigabilis (unwearying). Frauenstädt participated in contemporary debates over materialism in his 1855 and 1856 books and pessimism in his works on Schopenhauer.

== Works ==
While Frauenstädt's early books reveal his interest in Hegel and Schelling, his 1848 book is dedicated to Schopenhauer and he became a prominent advocate for his philosophy in this and subsequent works:

- Studien und Kritiken zur Theologie und Philosophie, 1840
- Schelling's Vorlesungen in Berlin: Darstellung und Kritik der Hauptpunkte derselben, mit besonderer Beziehung auf das Verhältniss zwischen Christenthum und Philosophie, 1842
- Ueber das Wahre Verhältniss der Vernunft zur Offenbarung, 1848
- Aesthetische Fragen, 1853
- Die Naturwissenschaft in Ihrem Einfluss auf Poesie, Religion, Moral, und Philosophie, 1855
- Der Materialismus, Seine Wahrheit und Sein Irrthum, 1856 (written against Ludwig Büchner)
- Briefe über die Natürliche Religion, 1858
- Lichtstrahlen aus Immanuel Kant's Werken, 1872.

Frauenstädt edited the collected works of Schopenhauer: Gesammtausgabe der Werke Schopenhauers, 6 vols., 1873–74, 2d ed. 1877. His works concerning Schopenhauer's life and thought include:

- Briefe über die Schopenhauer'sche Philosophie, 1854
- Lichtstrahlen aus Schopenhauer's Werken, 1862, 7th ed. 1891 (with Otto Lindner)
- Schopenhauer, von Ihm und über Ihn, 1863
- Aus Schopenhauer's Handschriftlichem Nachlass, 1864
- Das Sittliche Leben, 1866
- Blicke in die intellektuelle, physische und moralische Welt: nebst Beiträgen zur Lebensphilosophie, 1869
- Schopenhauer-Lexikon, 1871
- Neue Briefe über die Schopenhauer'sche Philosophie, 1876
