= Walter Sinnott-Armstrong =

American philosopher (born 1955)

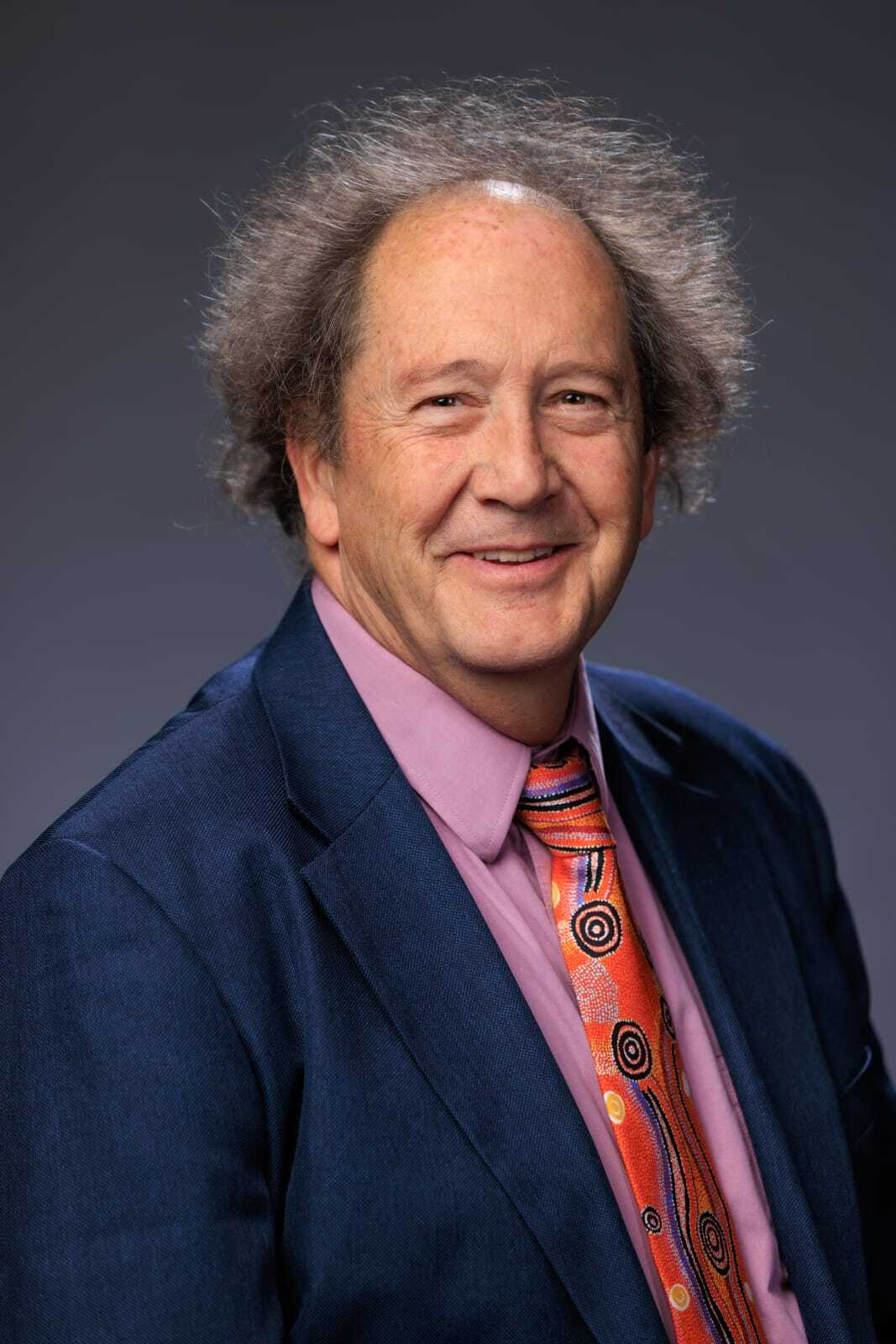
- Born: 1955 (age 70–71)
- Occupation: Philosopher

Education
- Education: Yale University
- Doctoral advisors: Ruth Barcan Marcus; Robert Fogelin

Philosophical work
- Institutions: Duke University
- Main interests: moral psychology epistemology philosophy of religion ethics
- Notable works: Moral Skepticisms (2006); Morality Without God? (2009)

Walter Sinnott-Armstrong (born 1955) is an American philosopher specializing in ethics, epistemology, neuroethics, the philosophy of law, moral psychology, and the philosophy of artificial intelligence.

He is the Chauncey Stillman Professor of Practical Ethics at Duke University. He also has secondary positions in Duke's Law School and the Department of Psychology and Neuroscience, and he is affiliated with the Duke Institute for Brain Sciences, as well as the Centers for Cognitive Neuroscience and Interdisciplinary Decision Sciences.

== Education and career ==
He earned his Ph.D. from Yale University in 1982 under the supervision of Robert Fogelin and Ruth Barcan Marcus, and taught for many years at Dartmouth College, before moving to Duke in 2010.

Sinnott-Armstrong is the Chauncey Stillman Professor of Practical Ethics at Duke University, holding appointments in both the Department of Philosophy and the Kenan Institute for Ethics. He is a core faculty member at several interdisciplinary research centers at Duke, including the Duke Institute for Brain Sciences, the Center for Cognitive Neuroscience, and the Center for Interdisciplinary Decision Sciences. He also serves as Resource Faculty in the Department of Philosophy at the University of North Carolina at Chapel Hill.

Beyond Duke, Sinnott-Armstrong serves as a Partner Investigator at the Oxford Uehiro Centre for Neuroethics and as a Research Scientist at the Mind Research Network in New Mexico. He has held leadership roles in the field, including as vice chair of the Board of Officers of the American Philosophical Association and co-director of the MacArthur Law and Neuroscience Project.

Sinnott-Armstrong also co-directs the Summer Seminars in Neuroscience and Philosophy and co-teaches the online course Think Again, a widely enrolled MOOC with over one million registered students.

== Philosophical work ==
His Moral Skepticisms (2006) defends the view that we do not have fully adequate responses to the moral skeptic. It also defends a coherentist moral epistemology, which he has defended for decades. In 1999, he debated William Lane Craig in a debate titled "God? A Debate Between A Christian and An Atheist". His Morality Without God? (2009) endorses the moral philosophy of his former colleague Bernard Gert as an alternative to religious views of morality. Sinnott-Armstrong argues that God is not only not essential to morality, but moral behaviour should be independent of religion. He strongly disagrees with several core ideas: that atheists are immoral people; that any society will become like Lord of the Flies if it becomes too secular; that without morality being laid out in front of us, like a commandment, we have no reason to be moral; that absolute moral standards require the existence of a God.

Sinnott-Armstrong is a proponent of Contrastivism, the idea that all claims of reasons are relative to contrast classes. Sinnott-Armstrong is known for advancing several notable philosophical positions including non-demanding consequentialism, Pyrrhonian skepticism, contrastivism, and more recently, semi-compatibilism.

He is known as an advocate for philosophy's public relevance and has been instrumental in shaping the interdisciplinary field of moral psychology.

His current research focuses on free will and moral responsibility, the role of moral narratives, and the ethical dimensions of artificial intelligence, particularly in legal and medical contexts. He has developed a method for building human morality into artificial intelligence systems in kidney allocation and medical treatment decision-making for patients with dementia.

== Selected publications ==
- Moral Dilemmas, Basil Blackwell, 1988.
- God? A Debate between a Christian and an Atheist, William Lane Craig and Walter Sinnott-Armstrong, New York: Oxford University Press, 2003.
- Moral Skepticisms, Oxford University Press, 2006.
- editor, Moral Psychology (Five Volumes), MIT Press, 2008.
- Morality Without God?, Oxford University Press, 2009.
- Think Again: How to Reason and Argue, Oxford University Press / Penguin Books, 2018.
- Moral AI: And How We Get There (Pelican Books). Pelican. February 8, 2024. ISBN 978-0-241-45476-3.

== See also ==
- Sealioning
