= Meta-ontology =

Study of the field of ontology

Metaontology or meta-ontology is the study of the field of inquiry known as ontology. The goal of meta-ontology is to clarify what ontology is about and how to interpret the meaning of ontological claims. Different meta-ontological theories disagree on what the goal of ontology is and whether a given issue or theory lies within the scope of ontology. There is no universal agreement whether meta-ontology is a separate field of inquiry besides ontology or whether it is just one branch of ontology.

Meta-ontological realists hold that there are objective answers to the basic questions of ontology. According to the Quinean approach, the goal of ontology is to determine what exists and what doesn't exist. The neo-Aristotelian approach asserts that the goal of ontology is to determine which entities are fundamental and how the non-fundamental entities depend on them. Meta-ontological anti-realists, on the other hand, deny that there are objective answers to the basic questions of ontology. One example of such an approach is Rudolf Carnap's thesis that the truth of existence-claims depends on the framework in which these claims are formulated.

The term "meta-ontology" is of recent origin. It was coined in the francophone world by Alain Badiou, in his work 'Being and Event,' in which he proposes a philosophy of the event conditioned by axiomatic set theory. Its first Anglo-American use can be found in the work of Peter van Inwagen, in which he analyzes Willard Van Orman Quine's critique of Rudolf Carnap's metaphysics, where Quine introduced a formal technique for determining the ontological commitments in a comparison of ontologies.

== Relation to ontology ==
Thomas Hofweber, while acknowledging that the use of the term is controversial, suggests that meta-ontology constitutes a separate field of enquiry besides ontology as its metatheory, when understood in a strict sense. But ontology can also be construed more broadly as containing its metatheory. Advocates of the term seek to distinguish 'ontology', which investigates what there is, from 'meta'-ontology, which investigates what we are asking when we ask what there is.

The notion of ontological commitment is useful for elucidating the difference between ontology and meta-ontology. A theory is ontologically committed to an entity if that entity must exist in order for the theory to be true. Meta-ontology is interested in, among other things, what the ontological commitments of a given theory are. For this inquiry it is not important whether the theory and its commitments are true or false. Ontology, on the other hand, is interested in, among other things, what entities exist, i.e. which ontological commitments are true.

== Realism ==
The meta-ontological realist holds that there are objective answers to the basic questions of ontology. Recent work in meta-ontological realism can be roughly divided into 2 approaches: the neo-Aristotelian approach and the Quinean approach.

=== Quinean approach ===
According to the Quinean approach, the goal of ontology is to determine what exists and what doesn't exist. Quine himself developed a specific version of this approach relying on first-order logic and pre-existing scientific theories in order to answer existence-questions. It involves translating these theories into first-order logic formulas. Their ontological commitments are then read off from the existential quantifiers used in the formulas.

One idea behind this approach is that scientific theories are our best guess about what is true. But in order for them to be true there should be something there that makes them true: their truthmakers. The existential quantifiers act as a guide to truthmakers.

Another approach to answering existence-questions is proposed by Amie L. Thomasson. Her easy approach to ontology differs from Quine's approach in that it relies on common sense instead of science. The approach is easy because it usually starts off from very trivial common-sense premises. For example, an easy argument for the existence of numbers in the philosophy of mathematics can be made in the following way. There are five books on the table. So the number of books on the table is five. Therefore numbers exist. Thomasson's approach differs from Quine's not just concerning her commitment to common sense but also concerning her account of quantification.

=== Neo-Aristotelian approach ===
According to the neo-Aristotelian approach, the goal of ontology is to determine which entities are fundamental and how the non-fundamental entities depend on them. The concept of fundamentality is usually defined in terms of metaphysical grounding. Fundamental entities are different from non-fundamental entities because they are not grounded in other entities. For example, it is sometimes held that elementary particles are more fundamental than the macroscopic objects (like chairs and tables) they compose. This is a claim about the grounding-relation between microscopic and macroscopic objects. A neo-Aristotelian would categorize this claim as an ontological claim.

Aristotle himself was also "neo-Aristotelian" in the sense that he held that entities from different ontological categories have different degrees of fundamentality. For example, substances have the highest degree of fundamentality because they exist in themselves. Properties, on the other hand, are less fundamental because they depend on substances for their existence.

Jonathan Schaffer's priority monism is a more recent form of neo-Aristotelian ontology. He holds that on the most fundamental level there exists only one thing: the world as a whole. This thesis doesn't deny our common-sense intuition that the distinct objects we encounter in our everyday affairs like cars or other people exist. It only denies that these objects have the most fundamental form of existence.

=== Comparison ===
According to Schaffer, an important difference between the two approaches is that the Quinean approach leads to a flat ontology while the neo-Aristotelian approach leads to an ordered ontology. In a flat ontology, there is no difference in fundamentality between the different objects: they are all on the same level. In an ordered ontology, on the other hand, the entities are part of a complex hierarchical structure with different levels. The higher levels of this structure are grounded in the more basic levels. Schaffer also distinguishes a third type of ontology which he calls sorted. Sorted ontologies classify entities into different exclusive ontological categories. But this classification doesn't entail any hierarchical relations between the entities of the different categories.

It has been argued that neo-Aristotelianism is not a genuine alternative to Quineanism. So theories in ontology may combine elements from both approaches without becoming inconsistent.

== Anti-realism ==
The meta-ontological anti-realist holds that there are no objective answers to the basic questions of ontology. One example of such an approach is Rudolf Carnap's thesis that the truth of existence-claims depends on the framework in which these claims are formulated. The choice between frameworks is guided by pragmatic considerations but there is no definite fact about which framework is correct. Quine disagreed with his teacher Carnap on these points, which led to the Carnap-Quine debate. Amie L. Thomasson summarizes the disagreement underlying this debate with reference to the distinction "between existence questions asked using a linguistic framework and existence questions that are supposed to be asked somehow without being subject to those rules—asked, as Quine puts it 'before the adoption of the given language'." Carnap refers to this distinction as the internal–external distinction.

== See also ==
- Grounding (metaphysics)
- Metametaphysics
- Metaphilosophy
