= David Lewis =

David or Dave Lewis may refer to:

== Academics ==
- A. David Lewis (born 1977), American comic writer and scholar of religion and literature
- David Lewis (anthropologist) (born 1960), English scholar of development
- David Lewis (lawyer) (c. 1520–1584), Welsh civil lawyer and first Principal of Jesus College, Oxford
- David Lewis (philosopher) (1941–2001), American philosopher
- David Lewis (psychologist) (born 1942), English neuropsychologist
- David A. Lewis, American psychiatrist and neuroscientist
- David C. Lewis (physician) (1935–2020), addictions treatment and drug policy expert
- David Levering Lewis (born 1936), American historian and biographer
- David Malcolm Lewis (1928–1994), English ancient historian
- David W. Lewis (lawyer) (1815–1885), American agriculturalist and Confederate Georgian politician
- David W. Lewis (mathematician) (1944–2021), Manx mathematician known for his contributions to quadratic forms theory

== Actors and film producers ==
- David Lewis (American actor) (1916–2000), American actor
- David Lewis (Canadian actor) (born 1976), Canadian actor
- David Lewis (producer) (1903–1987), American film producer

== Businessmen ==
- Dave Lewis (businessman) (born 1965), English businessman
- David Lewis (English merchant) (1823–1885), English merchant and philanthropist
- David Edward Lewis (1866–1941), known as Dafydd Lewis, Welsh-born Australian businessman and philanthropist
- David S. Lewis (1917–2003), American aerospace engineer and engineering industry executive

== Clergymen ==
- David Lewis (Anglican priest, born 1760) (1760–1850), Welsh Anglican priest and Rector of Garthbeibio, Montgomeryshire
- David Lewis (archdeacon of Carmarthen) (1839–1901), British Anglican priest and Archdeacon of Carmarthen
- David Lewis (Jesuit priest) (1616–1679), Welsh Catholic priest and martyr
- David Lewis (priest, born 1814) (1814–1895), Welsh Anglican priest who converted to Catholicism

== Musicians ==
- Dave Lewis (American musician) (1938–1998), African-American Seattle rock musician
- Dave Lewis (Northern Irish musician) (born 1951), Northern Irish singer-songwriter
- David Lewis (Australian musician) (born c. 1960), Australian jazz and pop musician
- David Lewis (singer) (born 1958), American lead singer for the R&B group Atlantic Starr
- David C. Lewis (musician) (1940–2021), American keyboardist and composer

== Politicians and judges ==
- Dave Lewis (politician) (born 1942), American state legislator in Montana
- David Lewis (British MP) (died 1872), British Member of Parliament for Carmarthen
- David Lewis (lord mayor) (born 1947), British solicitor and Lord Mayor of London
- David Lewis (Canadian politician) (1909–1981), Canadian politician and lawyer, leader of the New Democratic Party
- David Lewis (Oklahoma judge) (born 1957/1958), American judge in Oklahoma
- David Lewis (Indiana judge) (1909–1985), justice of the Indiana Supreme Court
- David Lewis, 1st Baron Brecon (1905–1976), Welsh businessman and Conservative politician
- David Chester Lewis (1884–1975), American lawyer, politician, and judge
- David John Lewis (1869–1952), American congressman and state politician in Maryland
- David P. Lewis (1820–1884), American Confederate politician and Governor of Alabama
- David R. Lewis (born 1971), American state legislator in North Carolina

== Sportsmen ==
=== American football ===
- Dave Lewis (linebacker) (1954–2020), American football linebacker
- Dave Lewis (punter) (born 1945), American football punter
- David Lewis (American football) (born 1961), American football tight end

=== Association football ===
- Dai Lewis (footballer) (1912–?), Welsh international footballer
- Dave Lewis (footballer), UK footballer for Cheltenham Town F.C.
- David Morral Lewis (1864–1925), Welsh international footballer

=== Rugby ===
- Dai Lewis (1866–1943), Welsh rugby union forward
- Dave Lewis (rugby union) (born 1989), Gloucester rugby scrum-half
- David Lewis (rugby league), Welsh rugby league footballer

=== Other sports ===
- Dave Lewis (ice hockey) (born 1953), Canadian hockey player and coach
- Dave Lewis (racing driver) (1881–1928), American racecar driver
- David Lewis (bobsleigh) (born 1936), British Olympic bobsledder
- David Lewis (Zimbabwean cricketer) (1927–2013), Zimbabwean cricketer
- David Lewis (cricketer, born 1940) (1940–2026), Welsh cricketer
- David Lewis (sport shooter) (1879–1966), British Olympic shooter
- David Lewis (tennis) (born 1964), New Zealand tennis player

== Writers ==
- David Lewis, co-writer with his wife Beverly Lewis
- David Lewis (poet) (1682–1760), British poet
- David Emrys Lewis (1887–1954), Welsh poet and journalist

== Other ==
- David Lewis (designer) (1939–2011), British industrial designer
- David Lewis (adventurer) (1917–2002)
- David "Robber" Lewis (1790–1820), American criminal
- David Thomas Lewis (1912–1983), US appeal judge
- David Lewis (Indiana judge) (1909–1985), of the Indiana Supreme Court
- Death of David Glenn Lewis (1953–1993), unresolved crime

== See also ==
- David Maybury-Lewis (1929–2007), British anthropologist
