= Modal metaphysics =

Branch of metaphysics concerned with possibility and necessity

Modal metaphysics is a branch of metaphysics concerned with the nature and metaphysical foundations of modal facts and statements, particularly those involving possibility, necessity, contingency, and impossibility. It investigates what it means for something to be possible or necessary, what makes modal statements true, and whether modal facts depend on possible worlds, the essences of objects, laws of nature, or other metaphysical principles.

Unlike ordinary factual statements, which describe how things actually are, modal statements concern not only actuality but also how things could have been or must be. For example, the statement "I could have become a dentist" describes a possibility that was not necessarily realized, whereas "Necessarily, 2 + 2 = 4" expresses a claim of necessity. Modal metaphysics seeks to explain the grounds of such claims and the nature of the possibilities and necessities they describe.

One influential framework for understanding modal claims is possible world semantics, developed within modern modal logic. In this framework, a proposition is possible if it is true in at least one possible world, and necessary if it is true in every possible world. However, the use of possible worlds as a formal framework does not by itself settle the metaphysical question of what possible worlds are or what makes them relevant to the truth of modal statements.

== Scope and fundamental concepts ==
Modal metaphysics examines several closely related concepts, particularly possibility, necessity, contingency, and impossibility. These concepts are used to explain the different ways in which a state of affairs may or may not obtain.

=== Possibility and necessity ===
Possibility and necessity are two central concepts in the study of modality. In standard modal frameworks, they are closely related and can be expressed through modal operators.

In modal logic, the following symbols are commonly used:

- $\Box p$: proposition p is necessarily true.
- $\Diamond p$: proposition p is possibly true.

The two operators are interdefinable through negation. Necessity can be understood as the impossibility of the negation, while possibility can be understood as the absence of necessity for the negation.

These relationships can be expressed as follows:

- $\Box p \leftrightarrow \neg\Diamond\neg p$
- $\Diamond p \leftrightarrow \neg\Box\neg p$

Two additional concepts are important:

- Contingency refers to a state of affairs that is actual but could have been otherwise, or one that is not actual but could have occurred.
- Impossibility refers to a state of affairs that cannot obtain under the relevant modal constraints.

For example, a person's being in a particular place at a particular time is generally contingent because that person could have been somewhere else. By contrast, a logical contradiction is traditionally considered impossible within classical logic.

=== Types of modality ===
Philosophers distinguish several kinds of modality according to the principles or constraints that determine what is possible and necessary.

- Logical modality concerns what is possible or necessary according to the principles of logic. A proposition is logically possible if it is consistent with the relevant logical system.
- Metaphysical modality concerns what could or could not have been the case given the nature of reality. It investigates possibilities that are not determined solely by the laws of nature governing the actual world.
- Physical modality concerns what is possible under the laws of nature. A situation may be logically conceivable but physically impossible because it conflicts with the laws of physics.
- Epistemic modality concerns what is possible or necessary relative to an individual's knowledge, information, or available evidence. It is therefore concerned with the limits of knowledge rather than exclusively with objective metaphysical possibility.

In some philosophical accounts, logical possibility is broader than metaphysical possibility, while metaphysical possibility is broader than physical possibility. On this understanding, what is physically possible is also metaphysically and logically possible. However, the precise relationships among these forms of modality remain debated.

=== De dicto and de re modality ===
An important distinction in modal metaphysics is between de dicto and de re modality.

De dicto modality concerns the necessity or possibility of a proposition as a whole. For example, the statement "Necessarily, all bachelors are unmarried" attributes necessity to a proposition.

De re modality concerns the properties or characteristics of a particular object or individual. For example, the statement "Socrates could have been a soldier" concerns a possible property or circumstance of a particular individual.

This distinction is important because claims about the necessary properties of objects raise questions about identity, existence, and the nature of objects across different possible circumstances.

== Historical development ==
The philosophical investigation of possibility and necessity has a long history, extending from ancient Greek philosophy through medieval scholasticism and early modern philosophy to contemporary analytic metaphysics.

=== Ancient and medieval philosophy ===
The systematic study of modality can be traced to Aristotle, whose logical writings examined modal propositions involving possibility, necessity, and impossibility. In Prior Analytics, Aristotle discussed the relationships among modal propositions and their logical consequences. These investigations became an important foundation for subsequent developments in the philosophy of modality.

During the Middle Ages, scholastic philosophers further developed modal concepts in connection with logic, theology, causation, and existence. They debated whether things could have been otherwise, how necessity relates to possibility, and whether contingent beings depend on a necessary being.

Medieval discussions also addressed the distinction between different forms of necessity, including logical, natural, and theological necessity. These debates contributed to later philosophical treatments of possibility and contingency.

=== Early modern philosophy ===
The concept of possible worlds became particularly influential in the philosophy of Gottfried Wilhelm Leibniz. He used possible worlds in discussions of creation, divine choice, contingency, and the relationship between necessity and actuality.

In Leibniz's philosophy, the actual world is one among several possible worlds. The actual world is the world that has been realized, while other possible worlds represent alternative ways in which reality could have been. Leibniz connected this account with the view that God chooses to actualize the best possible world.

His philosophical system linked modal questions with broader issues concerning existence, perfection, divine knowledge, and the principle of sufficient reason. Leibniz's work became an important influence on subsequent discussions of possible worlds and metaphysical modality.

=== Modern modal logic and analytic metaphysics ===
The development of modern logic provided new formal methods for analyzing possibility and necessity. In the early twentieth century, Clarence Irving Lewis and Cooper Harold Langford developed influential systems of modal logic. Subsequent developments involved philosophers and logicians such as Rudolf Carnap, Arthur Prior, Jaakko Hintikka, and Saul Kripke.

Kripke's work in the late 1950s and early 1960s was particularly influential in establishing possible-world semantics as a framework for interpreting modal operators. His contributions helped clarify the relationships between possibility, necessity, and the evaluation of propositions across different possible worlds.

The development of possible-world semantics also renewed interest in the metaphysical questions underlying modality, including the nature of possible worlds, the identity of objects across different worlds, and the distinction between essential and accidental properties.

== Possible worlds ==
A possible world is commonly understood as a maximally comprehensive way things could have been. The actual world represents the way things are, while other possible worlds represent alternative ways reality might have been.

Possible worlds provide a framework for explaining modal claims:

- A proposition is possible if it is true in at least one possible world.
- A proposition is necessary if it is true in every possible world.
- A proposition is contingent if it is true in some possible worlds but false in others.

For example, a historical event may have occurred differently in another possible world, even though it has a particular outcome in the actual world. By contrast, a necessary mathematical truth is traditionally understood as holding in every possible world.

Possible worlds are not necessarily understood as separate universes that literally exist. In metaphysics, they may be interpreted as concrete entities, abstract entities, or theoretical representations of possible ways reality could have been. The differences among these interpretations form a central debate in modal metaphysics.

== Ontological theories of possible worlds ==
Philosophers have proposed several theories to explain the nature of possible worlds. These theories differ in their ontological commitments and in how they account for the truth of modal statements.

=== Modal realism ===
Modal realism is an influential position developed by David Lewis. According to Lewis, possible worlds are concrete entities that exist in the same broad sense as the actual world. The actual world is not ontologically privileged over other possible worlds; rather, it is the world inhabited by the speaker or observer.

In Lewis's account, other possible worlds are spatiotemporally and causally disconnected from the actual world. A proposition is possible if it is true in at least one world, while it is necessary if it is true in every world.

This theory offers a systematic explanation of modal truths, but it also involves substantial ontological commitments. One major criticism is that it requires accepting the existence of a vast plurality of concrete worlds that cannot be directly observed.

=== Abstractionism and ersatzism ===
Abstractionism, often associated with the term ersatzism, treats possible worlds as abstract entities rather than concrete universes.

On this approach, possible worlds may be understood as sets of propositions, complete descriptions, states of affairs, or other abstract representations of ways reality could have been. These entities represent possibilities without requiring the existence of separate concrete universes.

Different forms of abstractionist approaches have been developed or discussed by philosophers such as Robert Merrihew Adams, Alvin Plantinga, and Robert Stalnaker. Their accounts differ in how they understand the structure and metaphysical status of possible worlds.

Abstractionism avoids some of the ontological commitments of Lewisian modal realism. However, it faces questions about what makes an abstract representation accurately represent a genuine possibility.

=== Modal fictionalism ===
Modal fictionalism treats discourse about possible worlds as part of a theoretical fiction or representational framework. According to this approach, statements about possible worlds can be useful for explaining modality without requiring that possible worlds literally exist as entities.

For example, the statement that a proposition is true in a possible world may be understood as a convenient way of expressing the claim that the proposition is possible. Possible-world discourse is therefore used as an explanatory device rather than as a commitment to the existence of other worlds.

Modal fictionalism primarily concerns the status of possible-world discourse. It does not necessarily reject possibility and necessity themselves.

=== Combinatorialism ===
Combinatorialism is a family of approaches that seeks to explain possible worlds through combinations or arrangements of elements, properties, and states of affairs.

Rather than treating possible worlds as separate concrete universes, combinatorial theories attempt to understand possibilities in terms of the ways in which the fundamental constituents of reality can be combined. These approaches are associated with discussions of states of affairs, recombination, and the relationship between possibility and the structure of the actual world.

Combinatorial approaches differ in their accounts of which elements can be combined and what restrictions govern the resulting possibilities.

== Essence and identity ==
Modal metaphysics is closely connected to the study of essence and identity. An essential property is generally understood as a property that an object must possess, whereas an accidental property is one that an object possesses but could have lacked.

For example, a particular person may have been born in a different city or chosen a different profession. Such characteristics are commonly regarded as accidental rather than essential. Other properties, especially those associated with the identity or nature of an object, may be considered essential, although their status is often disputed.

The distinction raises several philosophical questions:

- Which properties are essential to a particular object?
- Can an object exist without possessing certain properties?
- What makes an object the same individual across different possible circumstances?
- Is an object's essence independent of its modal properties, or can essence be explained in terms of necessity?

The relationship between essence and modality remains an important subject in contemporary metaphysics.

=== Essential and accidental properties ===
The distinction between essential and accidental properties is closely related to the distinction between necessary and contingent truths about objects.

An essential property is one that an object possesses necessarily, while an accidental property is one that it possesses contingently. For example, some philosophers argue that being human is essential to a particular human individual, whereas having a particular occupation is accidental.

However, there is disagreement about which properties are essential and how essential properties should be identified. Some theories explain essence in terms of necessity, while others argue that essence is a more fundamental notion that helps explain why certain properties are necessary.

=== Identity across possible worlds ===
The question of identity across possible worlds concerns whether an individual can exist in more than one possible world and, if so, what makes that individual the same individual in each world.

This issue is particularly important for de re modality. Statements such as "Socrates could have been a soldier" appear to refer to the same individual across different possible circumstances, even though the individual has different properties in those circumstances.

Philosophers have proposed different approaches to this problem, including theories based on transworld identity, counterpart relations, and essential properties.

Lewis, for example, developed a counterpart-theoretic account according to which an individual in one world has counterparts in other worlds rather than literally existing in multiple worlds. Other philosophers defend accounts that allow the same individual to exist across different possible circumstances.

== Epistemology of modality ==
The epistemology of modality investigates how people can know or justify beliefs about what is possible, necessary, or impossible.

Unlike knowledge of actual events, modal knowledge concerns circumstances that may never have occurred. For example, someone may judge that a particular person could have pursued a different career even though that possibility was never realized.

Philosophers have proposed several methods for investigating modal knowledge, including:

- Conceivability: determining whether a situation can be coherently conceived or imagined.
- A priori reasoning: using reasoning independent of particular empirical observations to establish modal claims.
- Counterfactual reasoning: evaluating what would have happened under circumstances different from those that actually occurred.
- Essentialist reasoning: examining the nature or essential properties of objects to determine what they can or cannot be.
- Empirical investigation: using scientific evidence to establish constraints on physical possibilities and natural laws.

However, the relationship between conceivability and genuine metaphysical possibility is controversial. A situation may appear conceivable without being metaphysically possible, and establishing the reliability of modal judgments remains an important philosophical problem.

== Impossible worlds ==
The concept of impossible worlds extends the discussion of possible worlds by considering descriptions or representations of situations that violate the relevant principles of possibility.

In classical possible-world semantics, impossible situations are generally excluded from the range of possible worlds. However, some philosophical and logical approaches introduce impossible worlds to represent inconsistent, contradictory, or otherwise impossible states of affairs.

Impossible worlds have been discussed in connection with non-classical logic, counterfactual reasoning, belief representation, and the analysis of inconsistent information. They may also provide a way to distinguish different kinds of impossibility that cannot be adequately represented using standard possible-world frameworks.

The metaphysical status of impossible worlds remains disputed. Some approaches treat them as abstract representations, while others use them as formal or theoretical devices without making strong ontological claims.

== Criticism and alternative approaches ==
Modal metaphysics has faced criticism concerning the intelligibility, necessity, and ontological status of modal facts.

W. V. O. Quine expressed skepticism about certain uses of modal concepts, particularly when modal logic is combined with quantification and claims about essential properties. His criticism raised questions about the coherence and theoretical usefulness of some forms of modal discourse.

Other philosophers have questioned whether possible worlds should be treated as fundamental metaphysical entities or whether modal facts can be explained through other concepts, such as laws of nature, dispositions, causal powers, or the essences of objects.

Some approaches attempt to explain modality through dispositions and powers. On such accounts, the possibilities available to an object are connected to its causal capacities and potentialities. Other approaches seek to understand modal facts through counterfactual conditionals or fundamental metaphysical principles.

These debates concern not only the nature of possible worlds but also whether modality is a fundamental feature of reality or can be reduced to other aspects of metaphysics.

=== Dispositional and powers-based approaches ===
Some philosophers seek to explain modality through the dispositions, powers, and capacities of objects. According to these approaches, what an object can do or what can happen to it depends partly on its causal powers and properties.

For example, the fragility of a glass is associated with its disposition to break under certain conditions. This disposition describes a way in which the glass could behave, even if it never actually breaks.

Powers-based approaches attempt to connect modal facts with the causal and dispositional structure of reality. They offer an alternative to explanations that rely primarily on possible worlds, although questions remain about how dispositions themselves should be understood and whether they can account for all forms of modality.

== Relationship with modal logic ==
Modal metaphysics is closely related to modal logic, but the two fields address different questions.

Modal logic is a branch of formal logic that studies systems involving operators such as necessity and possibility. It provides formal languages, axioms, and semantic frameworks for analyzing modal reasoning.

Modal metaphysics, by contrast, investigates the nature and metaphysical foundations of the modalities represented by these operators. It asks what makes a proposition necessary or possible, what possible worlds are, and whether modal facts depend on more fundamental features of reality.

Possible-world semantics is therefore an important connection between the two fields. It provides a formal framework for evaluating modal propositions while also raising metaphysical questions about the nature of the worlds used in that evaluation.

== See also ==
- Modal logic
- Possible world
- Metaphysics
- Necessity and sufficiency
- Essentialism
- Modal fictionalism
- Counterfactual
- Philosophy of language
- Philosophy of logic
- Ontology
