= Bobbitt =

Bobbitt is a surname. Notable people with the surname include:

- Arch Bobbitt (1895–1978), Associate Justice of the Indiana Supreme Court
- Betty Bobbitt (1939–2020), American-Australian actress
- John Franklin Bobbitt (1876–1956), American educator
- James M. Bobbitt (1930–2021), American chemist and professor
- John and Lorena Bobbitt, American couple known for Lorena severing John's penis
- Philip Bobbitt (born 1948), American author on Constitutional and military strategy
- Sean Bobbitt (born 1958), Texas-born British cinematographer
- William H. Bobbitt (1900–1992), Chief Justice of the North Carolina Supreme Court

== See also ==
- Justice Bobbitt (disambiguation)
- Eunice aphroditois, also known as the bobbitt worm
