= 1944 United States presidential election in Indiana =

- November 7, 1944
- Turnout: 71.7% ▼9.4 pp

Nominee	Thomas E. Dewey	Franklin D. Roosevelt
Party	Republican	Democratic
Home state	New York	New York
Running mate	John W. Bricker	Harry S. Truman
Electoral vote	13	0
Popular vote	875,891	781,403
Percentage	52.38%	46.73%
County results
Dewey
40–50%
50–60%
60–70%
70–80%
Roosevelt
40–50%
50–60%
60–70%
President before election
Franklin D. Roosevelt
Democratic
Elected President
Franklin D. Roosevelt
Democratic

A presidential election was held in Indiana on November 7, 1944, as part of the 1944 United States presidential election. The Republican ticket of the governor of New York Thomas E. Dewey and the governor of Ohio John W. Bricker defeated the Democratic ticket of the incumbent president of the United States Franklin D. Roosevelt and the junior U.S. senator from Missouri Harry S. Truman. Roosevelt defeated Dewey in the national election with 432 electoral votes.

== General election ==
=== Electors ===
Voters in Indiana chose 13 members of the Electoral College from lists submitted by party officials prior to the election. State law specified that the names of the national party nominees for president and vice president be listed on the ballot, with a vote for a party's national candidates being considered a vote for all the electors nominated by that party. The names of the electors nominated by each party are listed below.

Thomas E. Dewey and John W. Bricker Republican Party	Franklin D. Roosevelt and Harry S. Truman Democratic Party	Claude A. Watson and Andrew N. Johnson Prohibition Party	Norman Thomas and Darlington Hoopes Socialist Party
Edward J. Hancock; Samuel E. Boys; E. Miles Norton; Josiah F. Ale; Harry Danielson; Ernest Galmeyer; Hurd Hurst; Isaac T. Sollers; Reid Dugger; Robert S. Davis; Manse Johnson; Leo Kinman; Clyde E. Whitehill	Carleton B. McCulloch; Araminta C. Kern; Frank Migas; Margaret Afflis; George N. Beamer; August J. Lassus; William Rollings; A. J. Stevenson; Ross Lockridge; L. N. Savage; W. I. Brunton; Glenn R. Henderson; Walter Myers Jr.	Sam B. Woods; Noah McCoy; R. L. Frame; Celia Wertenberger; Ralph Stallsmith; J. W. Myers; A. A. Ulmet; Phillip Swing; Harry Copeland; Zolly Golliher; C. M. Kroft; George M. Carr; I. F. Beeson	Eugene Cooney; Earl V. Hankins; Joseph Thomas; William Figolah; Clarence M. McColley; Wallace Whitmore; Lilly Miller; Charles Back; Charles H. Miller; Mayme Hartman; Arthur Seuta; Sam Thornburg; Luella Hunter

=== Results ===
1944 United States presidential election in Indiana
Party	Candidate	Votes	%	±%
Republican	Thomas E. Dewey John W. Bricker	875,891	52.38	▲1.93
Democratic	Franklin D. Roosevelt Harry S. Truman	781,403	46.73	▼2.30
Prohibition	Claude A. Watson Andrew N. Johnson	12,574	0.75	▲0.39
Socialist	Norman Thomas Darlington Hoopes	2,223	0.13	▲0.01
Total votes		1,672,091	100.00	

=== Results by county ===
1944 United States presidential election in Indiana by county
County	Thomas E. Dewey Republican		Franklin D. Roosevelt Democratic		Others		Margin		Total
County	Votes	%	Votes	%	Votes	%	Votes	%	Total
Adams	5,648	58.83%	3,804	39.62%	149	1.55%	1,844	19.21%	9,601
Allen	41,907	57.64%	30,445	41.87%	357	0.49%	11,462	15.76%	72,709
Bartholomew	7,689	50.99%	7,139	47.34%	252	1.67%	550	3.65%	15,080
Benton	3,621	63.38%	2,065	36.15%	27	0.47%	1,556	27.24%	5,713
Blackford	3,079	47.82%	3,207	49.81%	153	2.38%	-128	-1.99%	6,439
Boone	6,823	56.00%	5,292	43.43%	70	0.57%	1,531	12.56%	12,185
Brown	1,174	45.66%	1,352	52.59%	45	1.75%	-178	-6.92%	2,571
Carroll	4,872	57.28%	3,578	42.07%	55	0.65%	1,294	15.21%	8,505
Cass	9,788	52.89%	8,615	46.55%	103	0.56%	1,173	6.34%	18,506
Clark	7,241	42.39%	9,778	57.24%	62	0.36%	-2,537	-14.85%	17,081
Clay	6,688	53.28%	5,721	45.57%	144	1.15%	967	7.70%	12,553
Clinton	8,087	55.37%	6,381	43.69%	137	0.94%	1,706	11.68%	14,605
Crawford	2,488	50.50%	2,335	47.39%	104	2.11%	153	3.11%	4,927
Daviess	7,458	57.14%	5,523	42.32%	71	0.54%	1,935	14.83%	13,052
Dearborn	5,487	51.32%	5,157	48.24%	47	0.44%	330	3.09%	10,691
Decatur	5,479	60.86%	3,471	38.55%	53	0.59%	2,008	22.30%	9,003
DeKalb	7,479	60.38%	4,810	38.83%	98	0.79%	2,669	21.55%	12,387
Delaware	17,340	47.41%	18,780	51.35%	455	1.24%	-1,440	-3.94%	36,575
Dubois	4,855	47.78%	5,273	51.89%	34	0.33%	-418	-4.11%	10,162
Elkhart	20,659	60.39%	12,991	37.98%	558	1.63%	7,668	22.42%	34,208
Fayette	5,603	51.23%	5,299	48.45%	36	0.33%	304	2.78%	10,938
Floyd	8,410	44.10%	10,541	55.27%	120	0.63%	-2,131	-11.17%	19,071
Fountain	5,557	57.74%	4,022	41.79%	46	0.48%	1,535	15.95%	9,625
Franklin	3,796	59.82%	2,530	39.87%	20	0.32%	1,266	19.95%	6,346
Fulton	5,190	61.28%	3,201	37.80%	78	0.92%	1,989	23.49%	8,469
Gibson	7,895	50.85%	7,462	48.06%	168	1.08%	433	2.79%	15,525
Grant	14,527	55.07%	11,031	41.82%	821	3.11%	3,496	13.25%	26,379
Greene	8,213	54.44%	6,744	44.70%	129	0.86%	1,469	9.74%	15,086
Hamilton	8,297	66.06%	4,101	32.65%	162	1.29%	4,196	33.41%	12,560
Hancock	5,139	51.71%	4,652	46.81%	147	1.48%	487	4.90%	9,938
Harrison	4,397	50.05%	4,285	48.77%	104	1.18%	112	1.27%	8,786
Hendricks	6,673	60.45%	4,297	38.93%	69	0.63%	2,376	21.52%	11,039
Henry	10,583	54.85%	8,297	43.00%	416	2.16%	2,286	11.85%	19,296
Howard	11,515	49.49%	11,224	48.24%	526	2.26%	291	1.25%	23,265
Huntington	8,668	57.15%	6,128	40.41%	370	2.44%	2,540	16.75%	15,166
Jackson	6,321	50.87%	5,982	48.14%	123	0.99%	339	2.73%	12,426
Jasper	4,364	66.63%	2,168	33.10%	18	0.27%	2,196	33.53%	6,550
Jay	6,207	53.38%	5,166	44.42%	256	2.20%	1,041	8.95%	11,629
Jefferson	5,748	56.17%	4,376	42.76%	110	1.07%	1,372	13.41%	10,234
Jennings	3,643	58.58%	2,537	40.79%	39	0.63%	1,106	17.78%	6,219
Johnson	6,194	53.06%	5,426	46.48%	53	0.45%	768	6.58%	11,673
Knox	10,023	48.98%	10,297	50.32%	143	0.70%	-274	-1.34%	20,463
Kosciusko	9,577	65.11%	4,865	33.08%	266	1.81%	4,712	32.04%	14,708
LaGrange	3,501	68.71%	1,539	30.21%	55	1.08%	1,962	38.51%	5,095
Lake	48,147	38.84%	75,066	60.56%	737	0.59%	-26,919	-21.72%	123,950
LaPorte	16,543	54.12%	13,896	45.46%	129	0.42%	2,647	8.66%	30,568
Lawrence	9,200	63.38%	5,246	36.14%	69	0.48%	3,954	27.24%	14,515
Madison	21,381	46.10%	24,488	52.80%	514	1.11%	-3,107	-6.70%	46,383
Marion	116,421	52.01%	106,382	47.53%	1,034	0.46%	10,039	4.48%	223,837
Marshall	8,225	59.88%	5,254	38.25%	257	1.87%	2,971	21.63%	13,736
Martin	2,467	49.37%	2,515	50.33%	15	0.30%	-48	-0.96%	4,997
Miami	8,207	55.54%	6,379	43.17%	191	1.29%	1,828	12.37%	14,777
Monroe	8,993	55.77%	6,809	42.23%	323	2.00%	2,184	13.54%	16,125
Montgomery	8,319	59.43%	5,620	40.15%	60	0.43%	2,699	19.28%	13,999
Morgan	6,115	59.09%	4,156	40.16%	77	0.74%	1,959	18.93%	10,348
Newton	3,398	67.91%	1,583	31.63%	23	0.46%	1,815	36.27%	5,004
Noble	7,200	62.89%	4,174	36.46%	74	0.65%	3,026	26.43%	11,448
Ohio	1,126	51.56%	1,043	47.76%	15	0.69%	83	3.80%	2,184
Orange	4,784	60.06%	3,130	39.29%	52	0.65%	1,654	20.76%	7,966
Owen	3,318	55.53%	2,602	43.55%	55	0.92%	716	11.98%	5,975
Parke	4,751	59.03%	3,241	40.27%	56	0.70%	1,510	18.76%	8,048
Perry	4,087	50.44%	3,996	49.32%	19	0.23%	91	1.12%	8,102
Pike	4,267	54.11%	3,513	44.55%	106	1.34%	754	9.56%	7,886
Porter	8,561	60.52%	5,528	39.08%	57	0.40%	3,033	21.44%	14,146
Posey	4,374	50.75%	4,183	48.53%	62	0.72%	191	2.22%	8,619
Pulaski	3,206	55.03%	2,509	43.07%	111	1.91%	697	11.96%	5,826
Putnam	5,386	52.38%	4,857	47.23%	40	0.39%	529	5.14%	10,283
Randolph	7,805	61.18%	4,590	35.98%	363	2.85%	3,215	25.20%	12,758
Ripley	5,642	59.12%	3,835	40.18%	67	0.70%	1,807	18.93%	9,544
Rush	5,853	59.60%	3,891	39.62%	77	0.78%	1,962	19.98%	9,821
St. Joseph	39,875	45.53%	47,149	53.83%	565	0.65%	-7,274	-8.30%	87,589
Scott	2,379	47.07%	2,621	51.86%	54	1.07%	-242	-4.79%	5,054
Shelby	6,816	49.63%	6,798	49.50%	119	0.87%	18	0.13%	13,733
Spencer	4,986	57.40%	3,647	41.99%	53	0.61%	1,339	15.42%	8,686
Starke	3,574	55.71%	2,791	43.51%	50	0.78%	783	12.21%	6,415
Steuben	4,739	71.61%	1,837	27.76%	42	0.63%	2,902	43.85%	6,618
Sullivan	5,855	47.23%	6,420	51.79%	122	0.98%	-565	-4.56%	12,397
Switzerland	2,019	47.32%	2,191	51.35%	57	1.34%	-172	-4.03%	4,267
Tippecanoe	15,888	60.61%	10,229	39.02%	95	0.36%	5,659	21.59%	26,212
Tipton	4,296	54.77%	3,427	43.70%	120	1.53%	869	11.08%	7,843
Union	1,998	63.05%	1,154	36.42%	17	0.54%	844	26.63%	3,169
Vanderburgh	30,684	46.87%	34,440	52.61%	338	0.52%	-3,756	-5.74%	65,462
Vermillion	4,998	50.17%	4,912	49.30%	53	0.53%	86	0.86%	9,963
Vigo	21,493	46.50%	24,649	53.33%	81	0.18%	-3,156	-6.83%	46,223
Wabash	8,357	62.30%	4,665	34.77%	393	2.93%	3,692	27.52%	13,415
Warren	2,870	64.73%	1,555	35.07%	9	0.20%	1,315	29.66%	4,434
Warrick	5,042	55.01%	4,049	44.17%	75	0.82%	993	10.83%	9,166
Washington	4,033	50.32%	3,940	49.16%	42	0.52%	93	1.16%	8,015
Wayne	15,295	54.51%	12,432	44.31%	332	1.18%	2,863	10.20%	28,059
Wells	4,708	50.03%	4,475	47.56%	227	2.41%	233	2.48%	9,410
White	5,039	58.25%	3,570	41.27%	41	0.47%	1,469	16.98%	8,650
Whitley	5,268	55.88%	4,079	43.27%	80	0.85%	1,189	12.61%	9,427
TOTAL	875,891	52.38%	781,403	46.73%	14,797	0.88%	94,488	5.65%	1,672,091

==== Counties that flipped from Democratic to Republican ====
- Bartholomew
- Cass
- Crawford
- Dearborn
- Gibson
- Hancock
- Harrison
- Howard
- Jackson
- Jay
- Ohio
- Posey
- Putnam
- Shelby
- Vermillion
- Washington
- Wells

==== Counties that flipped from Republican to Democratic ====
- Martin

== See also ==
- United States presidential elections in Indiana

== Bibliography ==
- Indiana (1944). Year Book of the State of Indiana for the Year 1944. [Indianapolis]: Division of Accounting and Statistics.
- Madison, James H. (1986). The Indiana Way: A State History. Bloomington: Indiana University Press.
- Petersen, Svend (1963). A Statistical History of the American Presidential Elections. New York: Frederick Ungar Publishing Company. LCCN 62-21786.
- Steers, Edwin; Lewis, David M., eds. (1944). Election Laws of Indiana and 1944 Political Calendar. Indianapolis: State Board of Election Commissioners.
