= Mark Massa =

American judge (born 1961)

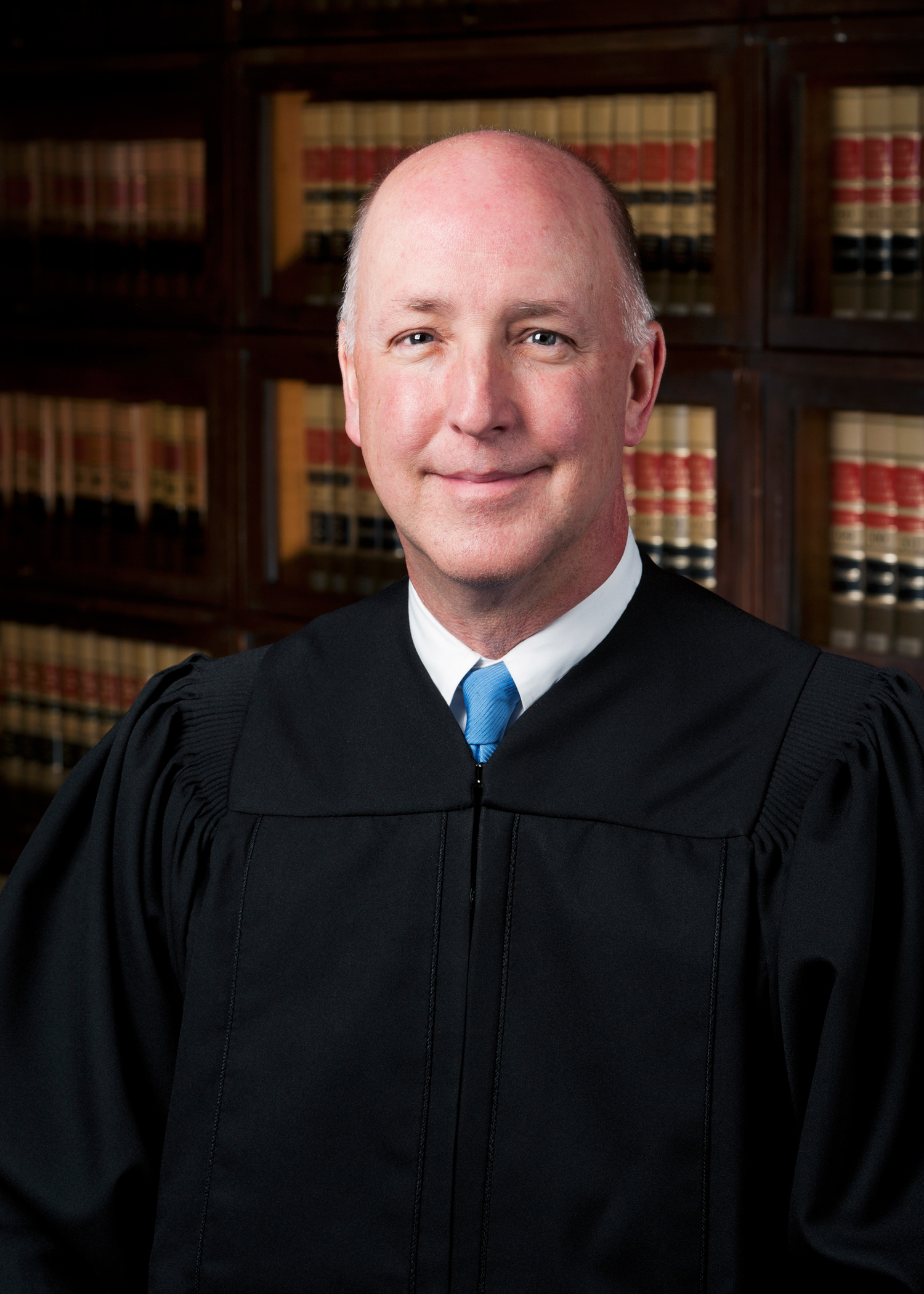

Associate Justice of the Indiana Supreme Court
- Incumbent
- Assumed office April 2, 2012
- Appointed by: Mitch Daniels
- Preceded by: Randall T. Shepard

Personal details
- Born: March 6, 1961 (age 64); Milwaukee, Wisconsin, U.S.
- Political party: Republican
- Education: Indiana University, Bloomington (BS); Indiana University, Indianapolis (JD)

Mark S. Massa (born March 6, 1961) is an American lawyer who has served as an associate justice of the Indiana Supreme Court since April 2, 2012, when he succeeded Justice Randall T. Shepard.

Massa was born in Milwaukee, Wisconsin and attended Greendale High School. He moved to Indiana in 1979 to attend Indiana University Bloomington, from which he received a Bachelor of Arts in Journalism in 1983. Massa interned at the South Bend Tribune and Milwaukee Journal Sentinel before becoming a sportswriter for the Evansville Courier & Press, where he also covered the courts and local government.

In 1985, he became a deputy press secretary and speechwriter for Governor Robert D. Orr. He then attended the evening division of Indiana University Robert H. McKinney School of Law, and was a law clerk for Indiana Supreme Court Chief Justice Randall Shepard from 1991 to 1993.

Massa joined the Marion County Prosecutor's Office in Indianapolis. After serving as a deputy prosecutor for 15 years, including seven years as chief counsel to Prosecutor Scott Newman. Massa was an assistant United States attorney in the Southern District of Indiana, where he earned the Inspector General's Integrity Award from the Department of Health and Human Services. He served as general counsel to Governor Mitch Daniels, chaired the Alcohol and Tobacco Commission, served on the Indianapolis Marion County Police Merit Board, and was executive director of the Indiana Criminal Justice Institute prior to his appointment to the supreme court.

In March 2012, Governor Mitch Daniels appointed Massa to the Indiana Supreme Court.

In 2018, Massa authored an opinion of the court holding that Indiana's shoreline on Lake Michigan was open to all, barring adjacent property owners from excluding others from such land.

August 23, 2023, Justice Massa joined the 4-1 decision without written opinion, putting Indiana's near total abortion ban immediately into effect.

In March 2024, Massa authored the majority opinion in Morales v. Rust, a case in which John Rust, a would-be Republican candidate for U.S. Senate, challenged Indiana election law, which requires candidates on a primary election ballot to demonstrate party affiliation by either (1) having voted in the party's two most recent primaries or (2) obtaining the county party chair's certification of their party membership. Rust could not satisfy either of the Affiliation Statute requirements. Before his candidacy could be challenged, Rust sued Indiana election officials and the Jackson County Republican Party Chair in state court. He requested—and the trial court granted—a preliminary injunction against enforcement of the Affiliation Statute against him. The trial court agreed with Rust that the challenged statute violated the First and Fourteenth Amendments by infringing his right of association; the Seventeenth Amendment by disenfranchising voters; Article 1, Section 23 of the Indiana Constitution by violating his equal-protection rights; the void-for-vagueness and overbreadth doctrines by failing to give fair notice of prohibited conduct and by overly restricting protected speech; and the Indiana Constitution's amendment process by adding eligibility requirements for candidacy. The trial court also found the county Republican chair's refusal to certify Rust's membership was invalid under the Affiliation Statute according to canons of statutory interpretation.

On direct appeal, the Indiana Supreme Court rejected the trial court's ruling and upheld the Affiliation Statute. Writing for the court, Justice Massa concluded that it does not violate the federal or state constitutions, including the right to free association under the First and Fourteenth Amendments to the U.S. Constitution. Applying the Anderson-Burdick framework that applies in First and Fourteenth Amendment challenges to state election laws, the court concluded that the Affiliation Statute passes constitutional muster. Explaining that Rust does not have a "fundamental right" to run for U.S. Senate as the Republican nominee but "still enjoys a statutory right to appear on the general-election ballot as an independent, Libertarian, or write-in candidate," the court determined that the Affiliation Statute "imposes a reasonable and nondiscriminatory restriction on Rust's right to be on the primary election ballot." The court then concluded that the state's "important regulatory interests"—including "safeguarding parties from forced inclusion of unwanted members and candidates," "sustaining the identifiability of political parties," "fostering the health and 'stability of their political systems,'" and "protect[ing] the integrity of the election process"—justify the restriction. Justice Goff, joined by Chief Justice Rush, dissented. Describing the law as "legislative overreach," the dissent concluded that the Affiliation Statute violates the First Amendment. Taking aim at the dissent, the court emphasized that it applied First Amendment doctrine more faithfully, while the dissent "express[ed] policy preferences" and would "assert[]" "raw judicial power" to "undermine[]" the will of the people and their elected representatives who enacted the statute. In response, Rust filed a petition for certiorari to U.S. Supreme Court. On October 7, 2024, the Court denied Rust's certiorari request.

Political offices
Preceded by Randall T. Shepard	Justice of the Indiana Supreme Court; 2012–present	Incumbent
