= Necessary =

Necessary or necessity may refer to:

== Concept of necessity ==
- Need
  - An action somebody may feel they must do
  - An important task or essential thing to do at a particular time or by a particular moment
- Necessary and sufficient condition, in logic, something that is a required condition for something else to be the case
- Logical necessity, a statement about facts that is unassailably true
- Metaphysical necessity, in philosophy, a truth which is true in all possible worlds
- Necessity in modal logic
- Necessity good in economics

== Law ==
- Doctrine of necessity, a concept in constitutional law
- Military necessity, a concept in international law
- Necessity (criminal law), a defence in criminal law
- Necessity (tort), a concept in the law of tort
- A necessity in contract law

== Other uses ==
- Necessity., a poem by Letitia Elizabeth Landon being part of Three Extracts from the Diary of a Week, 1837.
- "Necessary" (song), by Every Little Thing, 1998
- A bathroom or toilet, in some languages (in English this is an archaic usage)
- An economic need enunciated by US President Franklin D. Roosevelt in his 1944 Second Bill of Rights
- Necessity (novel), of 2016 by Jo Walton
- Necessary Records, UK record label
- "Necessary", a song by Jay Rock from the album 90059

== See also ==
- Bare Necessities (disambiguation)
