= Justice Bobbitt =

Justice Bobbitt may refer to:

- Arch Bobbitt (1895–1978), associate justice of the Indiana Supreme Court
- William H. Bobbitt (1900–1992), chief justice of the North Carolina Supreme Court
