= Metaphysics =

Study of fundamental reality

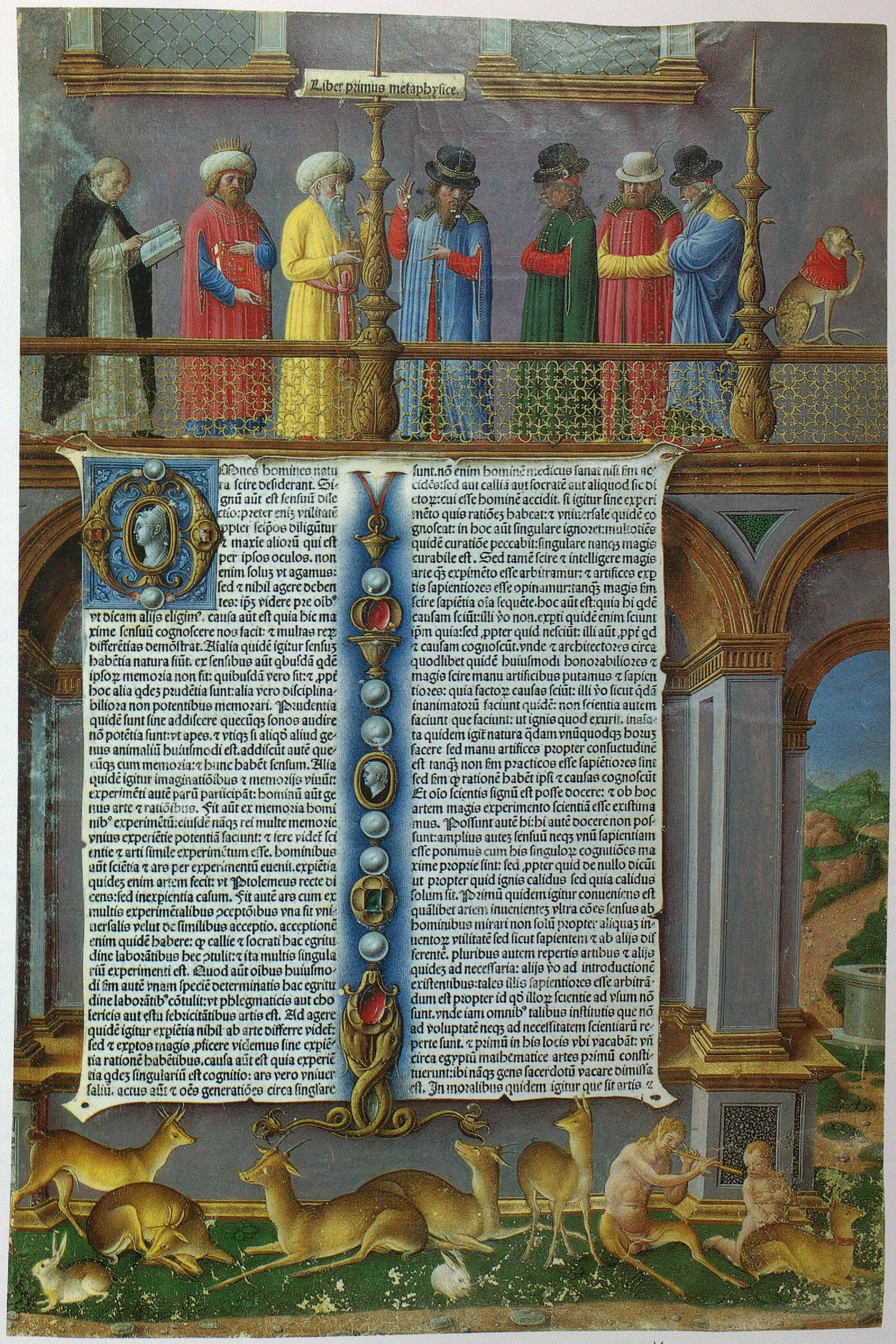
The beginning of Aristotle's Metaphysics, one of the foundational texts of the discipline

Metaphysics is the branch of philosophy that examines the basic nature or most fundamental structure of reality. It is traditionally seen as the study of mind-independent features of the world, but some theorists view it as an inquiry into the conceptual framework of human understanding. Some philosophers, including Aristotle, designate metaphysics as the first philosophy to suggest that it is more fundamental than other forms of philosophical inquiry.

Metaphysics encompasses a wide range of general and abstract topics. It investigates the nature of existence, the features all entities have in common, and their division into categories of being. An influential division is between particulars and universals. Particulars are unique individual entities, like a specific apple. Universals are general features that different particulars have in common, like the color red. Modal metaphysics examines what it means for something to be possible or necessary. Metaphysicians also explore the concepts of space, time, and change, and their connection to causality and the laws of nature. Other topics include how mind and matter are related, whether everything in the world is predetermined, and whether there is free will.

Metaphysicians use various methods to conduct their inquiry. They typically rely on rational intuitions and abstract reasoning but also include empirical approaches associated with scientific theories. Due to the abstract nature of its topic, metaphysics has received criticisms questioning the reliability of its methods and the meaningfulness of its theories. Metaphysics is relevant to many fields of inquiry that often implicitly rely on metaphysical concepts and assumptions.

The roots of metaphysics lie in antiquity with speculations about the nature and origin of the universe, like those found in the Upanishads in ancient India, Taoism in ancient China, and pre-Socratic philosophy in ancient Greece. During the subsequent medieval period in the West, discussions about the nature of universals were influenced by the philosophies of Plato and Aristotle. The modern period saw the emergence of various comprehensive systems of metaphysics, many of which embraced idealism. In the 20th century, traditional metaphysics in general and idealism in particular faced various criticisms, which prompted new approaches to metaphysical inquiry.

== Definition ==
Metaphysics is the study of the most elementary features of reality, including existence, objects and their properties, possibility and necessity, space and time, change, causation, and the relation between matter and mind. It is one of the oldest branches of philosophy. (Note: Philosophers engaged in metaphysics are called metaphysicians or metaphysicists. Outside the academic discourse, the term metaphysics is sometimes used in a different sense for the study of occult and paranormal phenomena, like metaphysical healing, auras, and the power of pyramids.)

The precise nature of metaphysics is disputed and its characterization has changed in the course of history. Some approaches see metaphysics as a unified field and give a wide-sweeping definition by understanding it as the study of "fundamental questions about the nature of reality" or as an inquiry into the essences of things. Another approach doubts that the different areas of metaphysics share a set of underlying features and provides instead a fine-grained characterization by listing all the main topics investigated by metaphysicians. Some definitions are descriptive by providing an account of what metaphysicians do while others are normative and prescribe what metaphysicians ought to do.

Two historically influential definitions in ancient and medieval philosophy understand metaphysics as the science of the first causes and as the study of being qua being, that is, the topic of what all beings have in common and to what fundamental categories they belong. In the modern period, the scope of metaphysics has expanded to include topics such as the distinction between mind and body and free will. Some philosophers follow Aristotle in describing metaphysics as "first philosophy", suggesting that it is the most basic inquiry upon which all other branches of philosophy depend in some way. (Note: For example, the metaphysical problem of causation is relevant both to epistemology, as a factor involved in perceptual knowledge, and ethics, in regard to moral responsibility for the consequences caused by one's actions.)

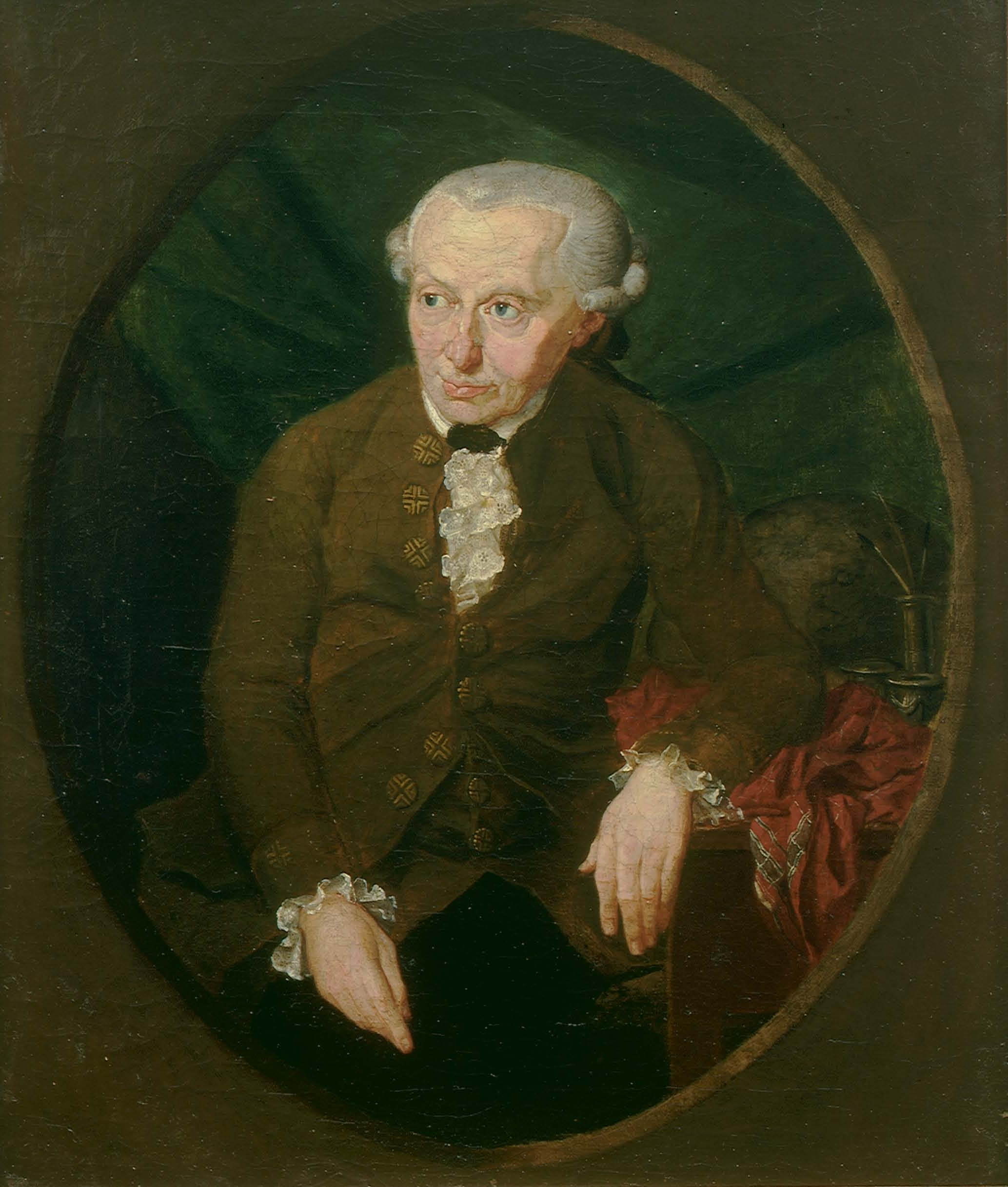
Immanuel Kant conceived metaphysics from the perspective of critical philosophy as the study of the principles underlying all human thought and experience.

Metaphysics is traditionally understood as a study of mind-independent features of reality. Starting with Immanuel Kant's critical philosophy, an alternative conception gained prominence that focuses on conceptual schemes rather than external reality. Kant distinguishes transcendent metaphysics, which aims to describe the objective features of reality beyond sense experience, from the critical perspective on metaphysics, which outlines the aspects and principles underlying all human thought and experience. Philosopher P. F. Strawson further explored the role of conceptual schemes, contrasting descriptive metaphysics, which articulates conceptual schemes commonly used to understand the world, with revisionary metaphysics, which aims to produce better conceptual schemes.

Metaphysics differs from the individual sciences by studying the most general and abstract aspects of reality. The individual sciences, by contrast, examine more specific and concrete features and restrict themselves to certain classes of entities, such as the focus on physical things in physics, living entities in biology, and cultures in anthropology. It is disputed to what extent this contrast is a strict dichotomy rather than a gradual continuum.

=== Etymology ===
The word metaphysics has its origin in the ancient Greek words metá (μετά, meaning 'after', 'above', and 'beyond') and phusiká (φυσικά), as a short form of ta metá ta phusiká, meaning 'what comes after the physics'. This is often interpreted to mean that metaphysics discusses topics that, due to their generality and comprehensiveness, lie beyond the realm of physics and its focus on empirical observation.

Alternatively, metaphysics may have received its name by a historical accident when Aristotle's book on this subject, Metaphysics, was published. Aristotle himself did not use the term metaphysics but an editor of his works some two centuries later (likely Andronicus of Rhodes) coined it for the title, presumably to indicate that this book should be studied after Aristotle's book Physics: thus, literally 'after physics'. The term entered the English language in the mid 1500s through the Latin word metaphysica.

=== Branches ===
The nature of metaphysics can also be characterized in relation to its main branches. An influential division from early modern philosophy distinguishes between general and special or specific metaphysics. General metaphysics, also called ontology, (Note: The term ontology is sometimes also used as a synonym of metaphysics as a whole.) takes the widest perspective and studies the most fundamental aspects of being. It investigates the features that all entities share and how entities can be divided into different categories. Categories are the most general kinds, such as substance, property, relation, and fact. Ontologists research which categories there are, how they depend on one another, and how they form a system of categories that provides a comprehensive classification of all entities.

Special metaphysics considers being from more narrow perspectives and is divided into subdisciplines based on the perspective they take. Metaphysical cosmology examines changeable things and investigates how they are connected to form a world as a totality extending through space and time. Rational psychology focuses on metaphysical foundations and problems concerning the mind, such as its relation to matter and the freedom of the will. Natural theology studies the divine and its role as the first cause. The scope of special metaphysics overlaps with other philosophical disciplines, making it unclear whether a topic belongs to it or to areas like philosophy of mind and theology.

Starting in the second half of the 20th century, applied metaphysics was conceived as the area of applied philosophy examining the implications and uses of metaphysics, both within philosophy and other fields of inquiry. In areas like ethics and philosophy of religion, it addresses topics like the ontological foundations of moral claims and religious doctrines. Beyond philosophy, its applications include the use of ontologies in artificial intelligence, economics, and sociology to classify entities. In psychiatry and medicine, it examines the metaphysical status of diseases.

Meta-metaphysics (Note: Some philosophers use the term metaontology as a synonym while others characterize metaontology as a subfield of meta-metaphysics.) is the metatheory of metaphysics and investigates the nature and methods of metaphysics. It examines how metaphysics differs from other philosophical and scientific disciplines and assesses its relevance to them. Even though discussions of these topics have a long history in metaphysics, meta-metaphysics has only recently developed into a systematic field of inquiry.

== Topics ==
=== Existence and categories of being ===
Metaphysicians often regard existence or being as one of the most basic and general concepts. To exist means to be part of reality, distinguishing real entities from imaginary ones. According to a traditionally influential view, existence is a property of properties: if an entity exists then its properties are instantiated. A different position states that existence is a property of individuals, meaning that it is similar to other properties, such as shape or size. It is controversial whether all entities have this property. According to philosopher Alexius Meinong, there are nonexistent objects, including merely possible objects like Santa Claus and Pegasus. (Note: According to Meinong, existence is not a synonym of being: all entities have being but not all entities have existence.) A related question is whether existence is the same for all entities or whether there are different modes or degrees of existence. For instance, Plato held that Platonic forms, which are perfect and immutable ideas, have a higher degree of existence than matter, which can only imperfectly reflect Platonic forms. (Note: Although commonly labelled Plato's theory of forms, there is some scholarly disagreement about the extent to which this position belongs to Socrates rather than Plato.)

Another key concern in metaphysics is the division of entities into distinct groups based on underlying features they share. Theories of categories provide a system of the most fundamental kinds or the highest genera of being by establishing a comprehensive inventory of everything. One of the earliest theories of categories was proposed by Aristotle, who outlined a system of 10 categories. He argued that substances (e.g., man and horse), are the most important category since all other categories like quantity (e.g., four), quality (e.g., white), and place (e.g., in Athens) are said of substances and depend on them. Kant understood categories as fundamental principles underlying human understanding and developed a system of 12 categories, divided into the four classes: quantity, quality, relation, and modality. More recent theories of categories were proposed by C. S. Peirce, Edmund Husserl, Samuel Alexander, Roderick Chisholm, and E. J. Lowe. Many philosophers rely on the contrast between concrete and abstract objects. According to a common view, concrete objects, like rocks, trees, and human beings, exist in space and time, undergo changes, and impact each other as cause and effect. They contrast with abstract objects, like numbers and sets, which do not exist in space and time, are immutable, and do not engage in causal relations.

=== Particulars ===
Particulars are individual entities and include both concrete objects, like Aristotle, the Eiffel Tower, or a specific apple, and abstract objects, like the number 2 or a specific set in mathematics. They are unique, non-repeatable entities and contrast with universals, like the color red, which can at the same time exist in several places and characterize several particulars. A widely held view is that particulars instantiate universals but are not themselves instantiated by something else, meaning that they exist in themselves while universals exist in something else. Substratum theory, associated with John Locke's philosophy, analyzes each particular as a substratum, also called bare particular, together with various properties. The substratum confers individuality to the particular while the properties express its qualitative features or what it is like. This approach is rejected by bundle theorists. Inspired by David Hume's philosophy, they state that particulars are only bundles of properties without an underlying substratum. Some bundle theorists include in the bundle an individual essence, called haecceity following scholastic terminology, to ensure that each bundle is unique. Another proposal for concrete particulars is that they are individuated by their space-time location.

Concrete particulars encountered in everyday life, like rocks, tables, and organisms, are complex entities composed of various parts. For example, a table consists of a tabletop and legs, each of which is itself made up of countless particles. The relation between parts and wholes is studied by mereology. (Note: Mereological problems were discussed as early as ancient Greek philosophy.) The problem of the many is a philosophical question about the conditions under which several individual things compose a larger whole. For example, a cloud comprises many droplets without a clear boundary, raising the question of which droplets form part of the cloud. According to mereological universalists, every collection of entities forms a whole. This means that what seems to be a single cloud is an overlay of countless clouds, one for each cloud-like collection of water droplets. Mereological moderatists hold that certain conditions must be met for a group of entities to compose a whole, for example, that the entities touch one another. Mereological nihilists reject the idea of wholes altogether, claiming that there are no clouds or tables but only particles that are arranged cloud-wise or table-wise. A related mereological problem is whether there are simple entities that have no proper parts, as atomists claim, or whether everything can be endlessly subdivided into smaller parts, as continuum theorists contend.

=== Universals ===
Universals are general entities, encompassing both properties (Note: Trope theory proposes a different approach by conceptualizing properties as particularized instances, called tropes.) and relations, that express what particulars are like and how they resemble one another. They are repeatable, meaning that they are not limited to a unique existent but can be instantiated by different particulars at the same time. For example, the particulars Nelson Mandela and Mahatma Gandhi instantiate the universal humanity, similar to how a strawberry and a ruby instantiate the universal red.

A topic discussed since ancient philosophy, the problem of universals consists in the challenge of characterizing the ontological status of universals. Realists argue that universals are real, mind-independent entities that exist in addition to particulars. According to Platonic realists, universals exist independently of particulars, which implies that the universal red would continue to exist even if there were no red things. A more moderate form of realism, inspired by Aristotle, states that universals depend on particulars, meaning that they are only real if they are instantiated. Nominalists reject the idea that universals exist in either form. For them, the world is composed exclusively of particulars. Conceptualists offer an intermediate position, stating that universals exist, but only as concepts in the mind used to order experience by classifying entities. (Note: The positions of nominalism and conceptualism were formulated in medieval philosophy.)

Natural and social kinds are often understood as special types of universals. Entities belonging to the same natural kind share certain fundamental features characteristic of the structure of the natural world. In this regard, natural kinds are not an artificially constructed classification but are discovered, (Note: The classified entities do not have to occur naturally and can encompass man-made products, such as synthetic chemical substances.) usually by the natural sciences, and include kinds like electrons, H_{2}O, and tigers. Scientific realists and anti-realists disagree about whether natural kinds exist. Social kinds, like money and baseball, are studied by social metaphysics and characterized as useful social constructions that, while not purely fictional, do not reflect the fundamental structure of mind-independent reality.

=== Possibility and necessity ===
The concepts of possibility and necessity convey what can or must be the case, expressed in modal statements like "it is possible to find a cure for cancer" and "it is necessary that two plus two equals four". Modal metaphysics studies metaphysical problems surrounding possibility and necessity, for instance, why some modal statements are true while others are false. (Note: A further topic concerns different types of modality, such as the contrast between physical, metaphysical, and logical necessity based on whether the necessity has its source in the laws of nature, the essences of things, or the laws of logic.) Some metaphysicians hold that modality is a fundamental aspect of reality, meaning that besides facts about what is the case, there are additional facts about what could or must be the case. A different view argues that modal truths are not about an independent aspect of reality but can be reduced to non-modal characteristics, for example, to facts about what properties or linguistic descriptions are compatible with each other or to fictional statements.

Borrowing a term from German philosopher Gottfried Wilhelm Leibniz's theodicy, many metaphysicians use the concept of possible worlds to analyze the meaning and ontological ramifications of modal statements. A possible world is a complete and consistent way the totality of things could have been. For example, the dinosaurs were wiped out in the actual world but there are possible worlds in which they are still alive. According to possible world semantics, a statement is possibly true if it is true in at least one possible world, whereas it is necessarily true if it is true in all possible worlds. Modal realists argue that possible worlds exist as concrete entities in the same sense as the actual world, with the main difference being that the actual world is the world we live in while other possible worlds are inhabited by counterparts. This view is controversial and various alternatives have been suggested, for example, that possible worlds only exist as abstract objects or are similar to stories told in works of fiction.

=== Space, time, and change ===
Space and time are dimensions that entities occupy. Spacetime realists state that space and time are fundamental aspects of reality and exist independently of the human mind. Spacetime idealists, by contrast, hold that space and time are constructs of the human mind, created to organize and make sense of reality. Spacetime absolutism or substantivalism understands spacetime as a distinct object, with some metaphysicians conceptualizing it as a container that holds all other entities within it. Spacetime relationism sees spacetime not as an object but as a network of relations between objects, such as the spatial relation of being next to and the temporal relation of coming before.

In the metaphysics of time, an important contrast is between the A-series and the B-series. According to the A-series theory, the flow of time is real, meaning that events are categorized into the past, present, and future. The present continually moves forward in time and events that are in the present now will eventually change their status and lie in the past. From the perspective of the B-series theory, time is static, and events are ordered by the temporal relations earlier-than and later-than without any essential difference between past, present, and future. Eternalism holds that past, present, and future are equally real, whereas presentism asserts that only entities in the present exist.

Material objects persist through time and change in the process, like a tree that grows or loses leaves. The main ways of conceptualizing persistence through time are endurantism and perdurantism. According to endurantism, material objects are three-dimensional entities that are wholly present at each moment. As they change, they gain or lose properties but otherwise remain the same. Perdurantists see material objects as four-dimensional entities that extend through time and are made up of different temporal parts. At each moment, only one part of the object is present, not the object as a whole. Change means that an earlier part is qualitatively different from a later part. For example, when a banana ripens, there is an unripe part followed by a ripe part.

=== Causality ===
Causality is the relation between cause and effect whereby one entity produces or alters another entity. For instance, if a person bumps a glass and spills its contents then the bump is the cause and the spill is the effect. Besides the single-case causation between particulars in this example, there is also general-case causation expressed in statements such as "smoking causes cancer". The term agent causation is used when people and their actions cause something. Causation is usually interpreted deterministically, meaning that a cause always brings about its effect. However, some philosophers such as G. E. M. Anscombe have provided counterexamples to this idea. Such counterexamples have inspired the development of probabilistic theories, which claim that the cause merely increases the probability that the effect occurs. This view can explain that smoking causes cancer even though this does not happen in every single case.

The regularity theory of causation, inspired by David Hume's philosophy, states that causation is nothing but a constant conjunction in which the mind apprehends that one phenomenon, like putting one's hand in a fire, is always followed by another phenomenon, like a feeling of pain. According to nomic regularity theories, regularities manifest as laws of nature studied by science. Counterfactual theories focus not on regularities but on how effects depend on their causes. They state that effects owe their existence to the cause and would not occur without them. According to primitivism, causation is a basic concept that cannot be analyzed in terms of non-causal concepts, such as regularities or dependence relations. One form of primitivism identifies causal powers inherent in entities as the underlying mechanism. Eliminativists reject the above theories by holding that there is no causation.

=== Mind and free will ===
Different approaches toward resolving the mind–body problem

Mind encompasses phenomena like thinking, perceiving, feeling, and desiring as well as the underlying faculties responsible for these phenomena. The mind–body problem is the challenge of clarifying the relation between physical and mental phenomena. According to Cartesian dualism, minds and bodies are distinct substances. They causally interact with each other in various ways but can, at least in principle, exist on their own. This view is rejected by monists, who argue that reality is made up of only one kind. According to metaphysical idealism, everything is mental or dependent on the mind, including physical objects, which may be understood as ideas or perceptions of conscious minds. (Note: There are other forms of idealism that assert slightly different positions, such as transcendental idealism and absolute idealism.) Materialists, by contrast, state that all reality is at its core material. Some deny that mind exists but the more common approach is to explain mind in terms of certain aspects of matter, such as brain states, behavioral dispositions, or functional roles. Neutral monists argue that reality is fundamentally neither material nor mental and suggest that matter and mind are both derivative phenomena. A key aspect of the mind–body problem is the hard problem of consciousness or how to explain that physical systems like brains can produce phenomenal consciousness.

The status of free will as the ability of a person to choose their actions is a central aspect of the mind–body problem. Metaphysicians are interested in the relation between free will and causal determinism—the view that everything in the universe, including human behavior, is determined by preceding events and laws of nature. It is controversial whether causal determinism is true, and, if so, whether this would imply that there is no free will. According to incompatibilism, free will cannot exist in a deterministic world since there is no true choice or control if everything is determined. (Note: For example, the consequence argument by Peter van Inwagen says that people have no power over the future if everything is determined by the past together with the laws of nature.) Hard determinists infer from this that there is no free will, whereas libertarians conclude that determinism must be false. Compatibilists offer a third perspective, arguing that determinism and free will do not exclude each other, for instance, because a person can still act in tune with their motivation and choices even if they are determined by other forces. Free will plays a key role in ethics regarding the moral responsibility people have for what they do.

=== Others ===
Identity is a relation that every entity has to itself as a form of sameness. It refers to numerical identity when the same entity is involved, as in the statement "the morning star is the evening star" (both are the planet Venus). In a slightly different sense, it encompasses qualitative identity, also called exact similarity and indiscernibility, which occurs when two distinct entities are exactly alike, such as perfect identical twins. (Note: The term qualitative identity is sometimes also used in a weaker sense for entities that only share some properties. In this sense, a bulldog and a German Shepherd have a certain degree of qualitative identity since both have the property of being a dog.) The principle of the indiscernibility of identicals is widely accepted and holds that numerically identical entities exactly resemble one another. The converse principle, known as the identity of indiscernibles or Leibniz's Law, is more controversial and states that two entities are numerically identical if they exactly resemble one another. Another distinction is between synchronic and diachronic identity. Synchronic identity relates an entity to itself at the same time, whereas diachronic identity is about the same entity at different times, as in statements like "the table I bought last year is the same as the table in my dining room now". Personal identity is a related topic in metaphysics that uses the term identity in a slightly different sense and concerns questions like what personhood is or what makes someone a person.

Various contemporary metaphysicians rely on the concepts of truth, truth-bearer, and truthmaker to conduct their inquiry. Truth is a property of being in accord with reality. Truth-bearers are entities that can be true or false, such as linguistic statements and mental representations. A truthmaker of a statement is the entity whose existence makes the statement true. For example, the fact that a tomato exists and that it is red acts as a truthmaker for the statement "a tomato is red". Based on this observation, it is possible to pursue metaphysical research by asking what the truthmakers of statements are, with different areas of metaphysics being dedicated to different types of statements. According to this view, modal metaphysics asks what makes statements about what is possible and necessary true while the metaphysics of time is interested in the truthmakers of temporal statements about the past, present, and future. A closely related topic concerns the nature of truth. Theories of truth aim to determine this nature and include correspondence, coherence, pragmatic, semantic, and deflationary theories.

== Methodology ==
Metaphysicians employ a variety of methods to develop metaphysical theories and formulate arguments for and against them. Traditionally, a priori methods have been the dominant approach. They rely on rational intuition and abstract reasoning from general principles rather than sensory experience. A posteriori approaches, by contrast, ground metaphysical theories in empirical observations and scientific theories. Some metaphysicians incorporate perspectives from fields such as physics, psychology, linguistics, and history into their inquiry. The two approaches are not mutually exclusive: it is possible to combine elements from both. The method a metaphysician chooses often depends on their understanding of the nature of metaphysics, for example, whether they see it as an inquiry into the mind-independent structure of reality, as metaphysical realists claim, or the principles underlying thought and experience, as some metaphysical anti-realists contend.

A priori approaches often rely on intuitions—non-inferential impressions about the correctness of specific claims or general principles. (Note: The term intuition has a variety of other meanings in philosophy. It can refer to a simple opinion, a disposition to belief, what seems to be the case, or a relation between the mind and abstract objects. The concept plays a central role in the philosophy of Immanuel Kant, who understands intuitions as conscious, objective representations closely associated with the sense of space and time.) For example, arguments for the A-theory of time, which states that time flows from the past through the present and into the future, often rely on pre-theoretical intuitions associated with the sense of the passage of time. Some approaches use intuitions to establish a small set of self-evident fundamental principles, known as axioms, and employ deductive reasoning to build complex metaphysical systems by drawing conclusions from these axioms. Intuition-based approaches can be combined with thought experiments, which help evoke and clarify intuitions by linking them to imagined situations. They use counterfactual thinking to assess the possible consequences of these situations. For example, to explore the relation between matter and consciousness, some theorists compare humans to philosophical zombies—hypothetical creatures identical to humans but without conscious experience. A related method relies on commonly accepted beliefs instead of intuitions to formulate arguments and theories. The common-sense approach is often used to criticize metaphysical theories that deviate significantly from how the average person thinks about an issue. For example, common-sense philosophers have argued that mereological nihilism is false since it implies that commonly accepted things, like tables, do not exist.

Conceptual analysis, a method particularly prominent in analytic philosophy, aims to decompose metaphysical concepts into component parts to clarify their meaning and identify essential relations. In phenomenology, the method of eidetic variation is used to investigate essential structures underlying phenomena. This method involves imagining an object and varying its features to determine which ones are essential and cannot be changed. The transcendental method is a further approach and examines the metaphysical structure of reality by observing what entities there are and studying the conditions of possibility without which these entities could not exist.

Some approaches give less importance to a priori reasoning and view metaphysics as a practice continuous with the empirical sciences that generalizes their insights while making their underlying assumptions explicit. This approach is known as naturalized metaphysics and is closely associated with the work of Willard Van Orman Quine. He relies on the idea that true sentences from the sciences and other fields have ontological commitments, that is, they imply that certain entities exist. For example, if the sentence "some electrons are bonded to protons" is true then it can be used to justify that electrons and protons exist. Quine used this insight to argue that one can learn about metaphysics by closely analyzing (Note: Quine's method of analysis relies on logic translation to first-order logic in order to express claims as precisely as possible while relying existential quantifiers to identify their ontological commitments.) scientific claims to understand what kind of metaphysical picture of the world they presuppose.

In addition to methods of conducting metaphysical inquiry, there are various methodological principles used to decide between competing theories by comparing their theoretical virtues. Ockham's Razor is a well-known principle that gives preference to simple theories, in particular, those that assume that few entities exist. Other principles consider explanatory power, theoretical usefulness, and proximity to established beliefs.

== Criticism ==
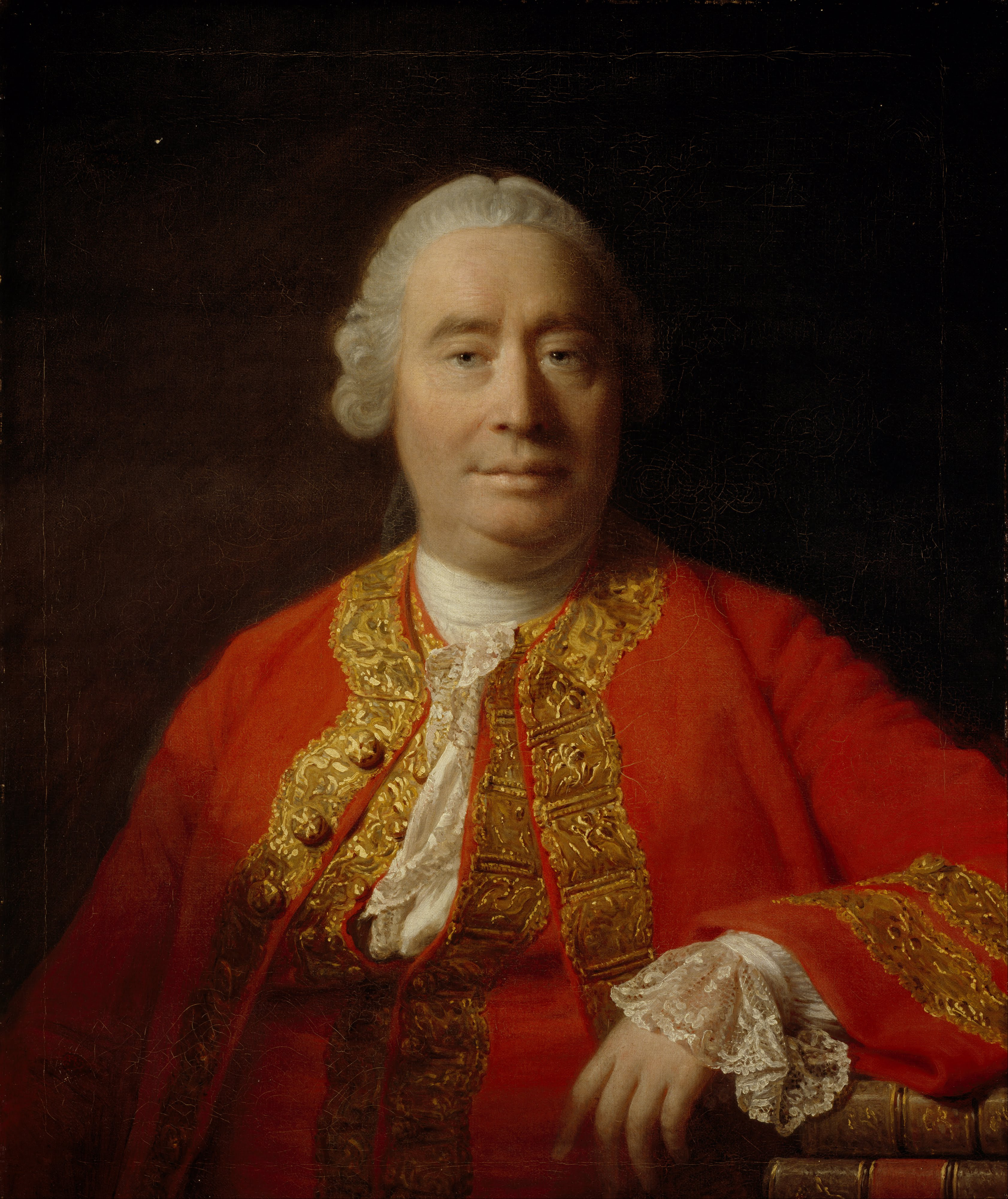
David Hume criticizes metaphysicians for trying to gain knowledge outside the field of sensory experience.

Despite its status as one of the main branches of philosophy, metaphysics has received numerous criticisms questioning its legitimacy as a field of inquiry. One criticism argues that metaphysical inquiry is impossible because humans lack the cognitive capacities needed to access the ultimate nature of reality. This line of thought leads to skepticism about the possibility of metaphysical knowledge. Empiricists often follow this idea, like Hume, who asserts that there is no good source of metaphysical knowledge since metaphysics lies outside the field of empirical knowledge and relies on dubious intuitions about the realm beyond sensory experience. Arguing that the mind actively structures experience, Kant criticizes traditional metaphysics for its attempt to gain insight into the mind-independent nature of reality. He asserts that knowledge is limited to the realm of possible experience, meaning that humans are not able to decide questions like whether the world has a beginning in time or is infinite. A related argument asserting the unreliability of metaphysical theorizing points to the deep and lasting disagreements about metaphysical issues, suggesting a lack of overall progress.

Another criticism holds that the problem lies not with human cognitive abilities but with metaphysical statements themselves, which some claim are neither true nor false but meaningless. According to logical positivists, for instance, the meaning of a statement is given by the procedure used to verify it, usually through the observations that would confirm it. Based on this controversial assumption, they argue that metaphysical statements are meaningless since they make no testable predictions about experience.

A slightly weaker position allows metaphysical statements to have meaning while holding that metaphysical disagreements are merely verbal disputes about different ways to describe the world. According to this view, the disagreement in the metaphysics of composition about whether there are tables or only particles arranged table-wise is a trivial debate about linguistic preferences without any substantive consequences for the nature of reality. The position that metaphysical disputes have no meaning or no significant point is called metaphysical or ontological deflationism. This view is opposed by so-called serious metaphysicians, who contend that metaphysical disputes are about substantial features of the underlying structure of reality. A closely related debate between ontological realists and anti-realists concerns the question of whether there are any objective facts that determine which metaphysical theories are true. A different criticism, formulated by pragmatists, sees the fault of metaphysics not in its cognitive ambitions or the meaninglessness of its statements, but in its practical irrelevance and lack of usefulness.

Martin Heidegger criticized traditional metaphysics, saying that it fails to distinguish between individual entities and being as their ontological ground. His attempt to reveal the underlying assumptions and limitations in the history of metaphysics to "overcome metaphysics" influenced Jacques Derrida's method of deconstruction. Derrida employed this approach to criticize metaphysical texts for relying on opposing terms, like presence and absence, which he thought were inherently unstable and contradictory.

There is no consensus about the validity of these criticisms and whether they affect metaphysics as a whole or only certain issues or approaches in it. For example, it could be the case that certain metaphysical disputes are merely verbal while others are substantive.

== Relation to other disciplines ==
Metaphysics is related to many fields of inquiry by investigating their basic concepts and relation to the fundamental structure of reality. For example, the natural sciences rely on concepts such as law of nature, causation, necessity, and spacetime to formulate their theories and predict or explain the outcomes of experiments. While scientists primarily focus on applying these concepts to specific situations, metaphysics examines their general nature and how they depend on each other. For instance, physicists formulate laws of nature, like laws of gravitation and thermodynamics, to describe how physical systems behave under various conditions. Metaphysicians, by contrast, examine what all laws of nature have in common, asking whether they merely describe contingent regularities or express necessary relations. New scientific discoveries have also influenced existing metaphysical theories and inspired new ones. Einstein's theory of relativity, for instance, prompted various metaphysicians to conceive space and time as a unified dimension rather than as independent dimensions. Empirically focused metaphysicians often rely on scientific theories to ground their theories about the nature of reality in empirical observations.

Similar issues arise in the social sciences where metaphysicians investigate their basic concepts and analyze their metaphysical implications. This includes questions like whether social facts emerge from non-social facts, whether social groups and institutions have mind-independent existence, and how they persist through time. Metaphysical assumptions and topics in psychology and psychiatry include the questions about the relation between body and mind, whether the nature of the human mind is historically fixed, and what the metaphysical status of diseases is.

Metaphysics is similar to both physical cosmology and theology in its exploration of the first causes and the universe as a whole. Key differences are that metaphysics relies on rational inquiry while physical cosmology gives more weight to empirical observations and theology incorporates divine revelation and other faith-based doctrines. Historically, cosmology and theology were considered subfields of metaphysics.

Suggested Upper Merged Ontology

- Entity
  - Physical
    - Object
    - Process
  - Abstract
    - Quantity
    - Proposition
    - Attribute
    - Relation
    - Set or Class

Fundamental categories in the Suggested Upper Merged Ontology

Computer scientists rely on metaphysics in the form of ontology to represent and classify objects. They develop conceptual frameworks, called ontologies, for limited domains, such as a database with categories like person, company, address, and name to represent information about clients and employees. Ontologies provide standards for encoding and storing information in a structured way, allowing computational processes to use the information for various purposes. Upper ontologies, such as Suggested Upper Merged Ontology and Basic Formal Ontology, define concepts at a more abstract level, making it possible to integrate information belonging to different domains.

Logic as the study of correct reasoning is often used by metaphysicians to engage in their inquiry and express insights through precise logical formulas. (Note: For example, higher-order metaphysics makes extensive use of higher-order logic to analyze metaphysical problems.) Another relation between the two fields concerns the metaphysical assumptions associated with logical systems. Many logical systems like first-order logic rely on existential quantifiers to express existential statements. For instance, in the logical formula $\exists x \text{Horse}(x)$ the existential quantifier $\exists$ is applied to the predicate $\text{Horse}$ to express that there are horses. Following Quine, various metaphysicians assume that existential quantifiers carry ontological commitments, meaning that existential statements imply that the entities over which one quantifies are part of reality.

== History ==
The taijitu symbol shows yin and yang, which are two correlated forces discussed in Chinese metaphysics to explore the nature and patterns of existence.

Metaphysics originated in the ancient period from speculations about the nature and origin of the cosmos. In ancient India, starting in the 7th century BCE, the Upanishads were written as religious and philosophical texts that examine how ultimate reality constitutes the ground of all being. They further explore the nature of the self and how it can reach liberation by understanding ultimate reality. This period also saw the emergence of Buddhism in the 6th century BCE, (Note: The precise date is disputed.) which denies the existence of an independent self and understands the world as a cyclic process. At about the same time (Note: According to traditional accounts, Laozi as the founder of Taoism lived in the 6th century BCE but other accounts state that he may have lived in the 4th or 3rd centuries BCE.) in ancient China, the school of Taoism was formed and explored the natural order of the universe, known as Tao, and how it is characterized by the interplay of yin and yang as two correlated forces.

In ancient Greece, metaphysics emerged in the 6th century BCE with the pre-Socratic philosophers, who gave rational explanations of the cosmos as a whole by examining the first principles from which everything arises. Building on their work, Plato (427–347 BCE) formulated his theory of forms, which states that eternal forms or ideas possess the highest kind of reality while the material world is only an imperfect reflection of them. Aristotle (384–322 BCE) accepted Plato's idea that there are universal forms but held that they cannot exist on their own but depend on matter. He also proposed a system of categories and developed a comprehensive framework of the natural world through his theory of the four causes. Starting in the 4th century BCE, Hellenistic philosophy explored the rational order underlying the cosmos and the laws governing it. Neoplatonism emerged towards the end of the ancient period in the 3rd century CE and introduced the idea of "the One" as the transcendent and ineffable source of all creation. (Note: Influential Neoplatonists include Plotinus, Porphyry, Iamblichus, Hypatia, and Proclus.)

Meanwhile, in Indian Buddhism, the Madhyamaka school developed the idea that all phenomena are inherently empty without a permanent essence. The consciousness-only doctrine of the Yogācāra school stated that experienced objects are mere transformations of consciousness and do not reflect external reality. The Hindu school of Samkhya philosophy (Note: The ideas underlying Samkhya philosophy arose as early as the 7th and 6th centuries BCE but its classical and systematic formulation is dated 350 CE.) introduced a metaphysical dualism with pure consciousness and matter as its fundamental categories. In China, the school of Xuanxue explored metaphysical problems such as the contrast between being and non-being.

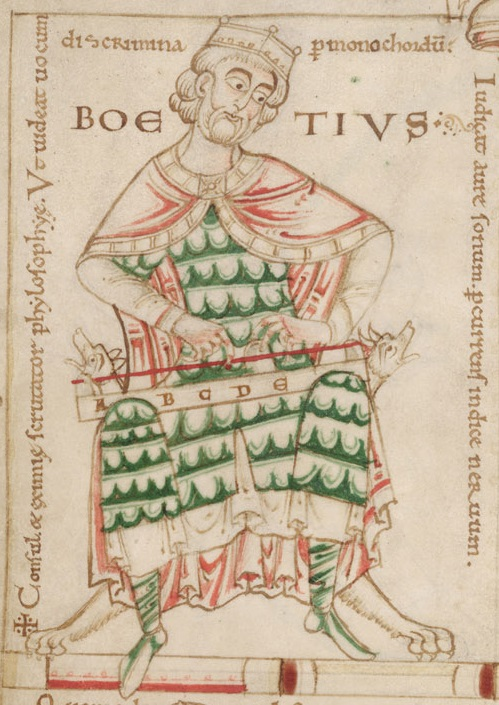
Boethius's theory of universals influenced many subsequent metaphysicians.

Medieval Western philosophy was profoundly shaped by ancient Greek thought as philosophers integrated these ideas with Christian philosophical teachings. Boethius (477–524 CE) sought to reconcile Plato's and Aristotle's theories of universals, proposing that universals can exist both in matter and mind. His theory inspired the development of nominalism and conceptualism, as in the thought of Peter Abelard (1079–1142 CE). Thomas Aquinas (1224–1274 CE) understood metaphysics as the discipline investigating different meanings of being, such as the contrast between substance and accident, and principles applying to all beings, such as the principle of identity. William of Ockham (1285–1347 CE) developed a methodological principle, known as Ockham's razor, to choose between competing metaphysical theories. Arabic–Persian philosophy flourished from the early 9th century CE to the late 12th century CE, integrating ancient Greek philosophies to interpret and clarify the teachings of the Quran. Avicenna (980–1037 CE) developed a comprehensive philosophical system that examined the contrast between existence and essence and distinguished between contingent and necessary existence. Medieval India saw the emergence of the monist school of Advaita Vedanta in the 8th century CE, which holds that everything is one and that the idea of many entities existing independently is an illusion. In China, Neo-Confucianism arose in the 9th century CE and explored the concept of li as the rational principle that is the ground of being and reflects the order of the universe.

In the early modern period and following renewed interest in Platonism during the Renaissance, René Descartes (1596–1650) developed a substance dualism according to which body and mind exist as independent entities that causally interact. This idea was rejected by Baruch Spinoza (1632–1677), who formulated a monist philosophy suggesting that there is only one substance with both physical and mental attributes that develop side-by-side without interacting. Gottfried Wilhelm Leibniz (1646–1716) introduced the concept of possible worlds and articulated a metaphysical system known as monadology, which views the universe as a collection of simple substances synchronized without causal interaction. Christian Wolff (1679–1754), conceptualized the scope of metaphysics by distinguishing between general and special metaphysics. According to the idealism of George Berkeley (1685–1753), everything is mental, including material objects, which are ideas perceived by the mind. David Hume (1711–1776) made various contributions to metaphysics, including the regularity theory of causation and the idea that there are no necessary connections between distinct entities. Inspired by the empiricism of Francis Bacon (1561–1626) and John Locke (1632–1704), Hume criticized metaphysical theories that seek ultimate principles inaccessible to sensory experience. This critical outlook was embraced by Immanuel Kant (1724–1804), who tried to reconceptualize metaphysics as an inquiry into the basic principles and categories of thought and understanding rather than seeing it as an attempt to comprehend mind-independent reality.

Many developments in the later modern period were shaped by Kant's philosophy. German idealists adopted his idealistic outlook in their attempt to find a unifying principle as the foundation of all reality. Georg Wilhelm Friedrich Hegel's (1770–1831) idealistic contention is that reality is conceptual all the way down, and being itself is rational. He inspired the British idealism of Francis Herbert Bradley (1846–1924), who interpreted Hegel's concept of absolute spirit as the all-inclusive totality of being. Arthur Schopenhauer (1788–1860) was a strong critic of German idealism and articulated a different metaphysical vision, positing a blind and irrational will as the underlying principle of reality. Pragmatists like C. S. Peirce (1839–1914) and John Dewey (1859–1952) conceived metaphysics as an observational science of the most general features of reality and experience.

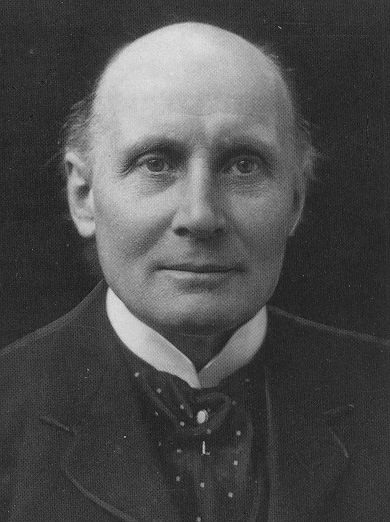
Alfred North Whitehead articulated the foundations of process philosophy in his work Process and Reality.

At the turn of the 20th century in analytic philosophy, philosophers such as Bertrand Russell (1872–1970) and G. E. Moore (1873–1958) led a "revolt against idealism", arguing for the existence of a mind-independent world aligned with common sense and empirical science. Logical atomists, like Russell and the early Ludwig Wittgenstein (1889–1951), conceived the world as a multitude of atomic facts, which later inspired metaphysicians such as D. M. Armstrong (1926–2014). Alfred North Whitehead (1861–1947) developed process metaphysics as an attempt to provide a holistic description of both the objective and the subjective realms.

Rudolf Carnap (1891–1970) and other logical positivists formulated a wide-ranging criticism of metaphysical statements, arguing that they are meaningless because there is no way to verify them. Other criticisms of traditional metaphysics identified misunderstandings of ordinary language as the source of many traditional metaphysical problems or challenged complex metaphysical deductions by appealing to common sense.

The decline of logical positivism led to a revival of metaphysical theorizing. Willard Van Orman Quine (1908–2000) tried to naturalize metaphysics by connecting it to the empirical sciences. His student David Lewis (1941–2001) employed the concept of possible worlds to formulate his modal realism. Saul Kripke (1940–2022) helped revive discussions of identity and essentialism, distinguishing necessity as a metaphysical notion from the epistemic notion of a priori.

In continental philosophy, Edmund Husserl (1859–1938) engaged in ontology through a phenomenological description of experience, while his student Martin Heidegger (1889–1976) developed fundamental ontology to clarify the meaning of being. Heidegger's philosophy inspired Jacques Derrida's (1930–2004) criticism of metaphysics. Gilles Deleuze's (1925–1995) approach to metaphysics challenged traditionally influential concepts like substance, essence, and identity by reconceptualizing the field through alternative notions such as multiplicity, event, and difference.

== See also ==
- Computational metaphysics – Branch of metaphysics regarding abstract objects
- Doctor of Metaphysics – Unaccredited academic degree
- Enrico Berti's classification of metaphysics
- Feminist metaphysics
- Fundamental question of metaphysics
- List of metaphysicians
- Metaphysical grounding – Metaphysical dependence relation between facts or entities
