= Myra C. Selby =

American judge

Myra Consetta Selby
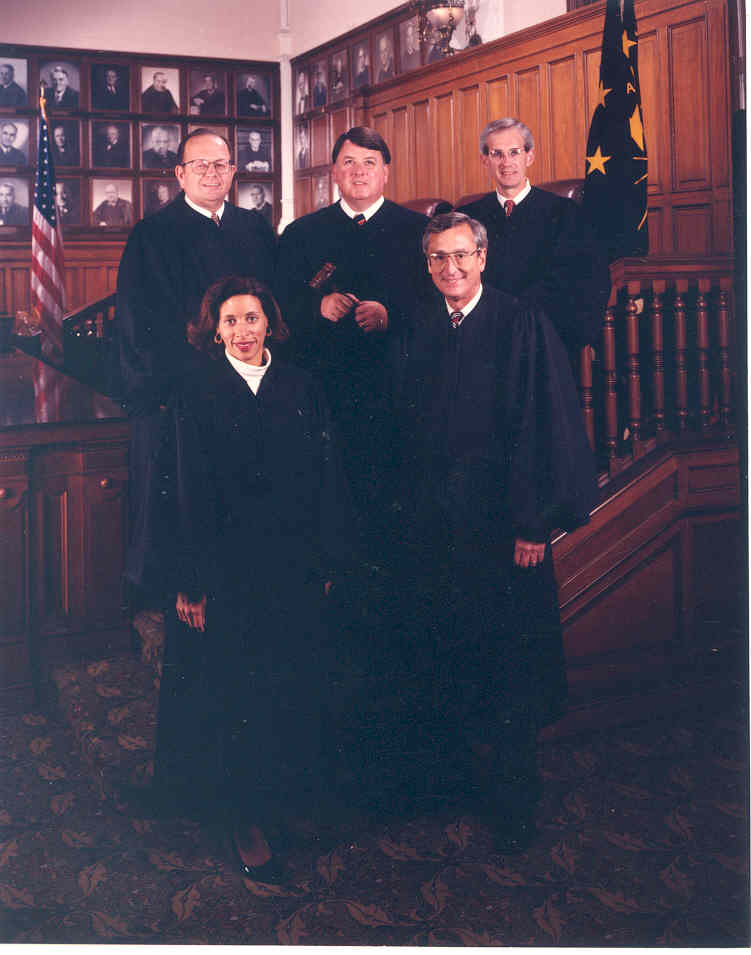
- The Indiana Supreme Court from August 8, 1996 - October 7, 1999. Front Row Left: Justice Myra C. Selby

Associate Justice of the Indiana Supreme Court
- In office January 4, 1995 – October 7, 1999
- Appointed by: Evan Bayh
- Preceded by: Richard M. Givan
- Succeeded by: Robert D. Rucker

Personal details
- Born: July 1, 1955 (age 71) Bay City, Michigan, U.S.
- Education: Kalamazoo College (BA); University of Michigan (JD)
- Profession: Attorney

Myra Consetta Selby (born July 1, 1955) is an Indiana attorney in private practice and is a former nominee to be a United States circuit judge of the United States Court of Appeals for the Seventh Circuit. Her nomination was denied a hearing by the Republican-majority Senate and subsequently expired on January 3, 2017. She served as an associate justice of the Indiana Supreme Court from 1995 to 1999.

== Biography ==
Selby was born on July 1, 1955, in Bay City, Michigan. She received a Bachelor of Arts degree in 1977 from Kalamazoo College. She received a Juris Doctor in 1980 from the University of Michigan Law School.

From 1980 to 1983, she practiced at the Washington, D.C., office of the law firm of Seyfarth Shaw. In 1983, she joined the Indianapolis, Indiana, law firm of Ice Miller Donadio & Ryan (now Ice Miller), as an associate in the health care group from 1983 to 1988 and the first African-American partner from 1988 to 1993. From 1993 to 1994, she served as the Director of Health Care Policy for the State of Indiana under Governor Evan Bayh. As Director of Health Care Policy, she was responsible for policy development and the execution of state health care programs.

In 1995, she was appointed to the Indiana Supreme Court, where she served as both the first African American and first woman appointed to the highest state court in Indiana. During her time on the court, she authored more than 100 majority opinions, including landmark decisions regarding tort law reform and medical malpractice claims. In 1999, she retired from the bench and returned to private practice as a partner at Ice Miller. Upon her departure from the bench in 1999, the Indiana Supreme Court asked her to chair the newly formed Commission on Race and Gender Fairness. She continues to chair the commission, where she leads the commission's efforts to study and make recommendations on increasing gender and racial fairness in the legal system. Her private practice is primarily commercial litigation with an emphasis in health care.

== Expired nomination to court of appeals ==
On January 12, 2016, President Obama nominated Selby to serve as a United States Circuit Judge of the United States Court of Appeals for the Seventh Circuit, to the seat vacated by Judge John Daniel Tinder, who took senior status on February 18, 2015. The Republican-majority Senate refused to hold a hearing on her nomination, which then expired on January 3, 2017, with the end of the 114th Congress. This seat was filled by Amy Coney Barrett.

== See also ==
- Barack Obama judicial appointment controversies
- List of female state supreme court justices
- List of African-American jurists

Legal offices
Preceded by Richard M. Givan	Associate Justice of the Indiana Supreme Court; 1995–1999	Succeeded by Robert D. Rucker
