= Randall T. Shepard =

American judge

Indiana Supreme Court Chief Justice
- In office September 6, 1985 – March 23, 2012
- Appointed by: Robert D. Orr
- Preceded by: Richard M. Givan
- Succeeded by: Brent Dickson

Personal details
- Born: December 24, 1946 (age 79) Lafayette, Indiana
- Party: Republican
- Education: Princeton University; Yale Law School; University of Virginia
- Occupation: Lawyer; Judge

Randall Terry Shepard (born December 24, 1946) is a former Chief Justice of the Indiana Supreme Court.

== Early life and education ==
Randall Terry Shepard was born in Lafayette in 1946, but spent most of his formative years in Evansville, Indiana. Shepard is a seventh generation Hoosier. He is an Eagle Scout and has received the Distinguished Eagle Scout Award. He graduated from Princeton University in 1969 and from the Yale Law School in 1972, and earned a Master of Laws degree from the University of Virginia School of Law in 1995.

== Career ==
Shepard served as executive assistant to Mayor Russell Lloyd of Evansville. In 1979, he was the Republican Party's nominee for mayor himself. He was later a special assistant to the Under Secretary of the U.S. Department of Transportation. He was judge of the Vanderburgh County Superior Court from 1980 to 1985. He was appointed the ninety-ninth justice of the Indiana Supreme Court by Governor Robert D. Orr in 1985. He was chosen to become the chief justice of Indiana in March 1987, then the youngest state chief justice. Chief Justice Shepard was a chairperson of Indiana's State Student Assistance Commission and a trustee of the National Trust for Historic Preservation for eleven years. He has also served as chair of the ABA Appellate Judges Conference and of the Section of Legal Education and Admissions to the Bar. He is currently the honorary chair and a member of the executive committee of the Indiana Landmarks. Shepard served as President of the National Conference of Chief Justices in 2005 and 2006.

In 2006, Shepard was appointed by Chief Justice John Roberts to be on the U.S. Judicial Conference Advisory Committee on Civil Rules, which the U.S. Supreme Court uses to form changes to the Federal Rules of Civil Procedure.

In September 2005 Shepard was chosen by the Indiana Judicial Nominating Commission and reappointed by Governor Mitch Daniels to the Supreme Court. On November 4, 2008, the public voted to keep Shepard on the court in a statewide retention election.

In July 2007, Shepard and former Governor Joe Kernan were appointed by Daniels to co-chair the Indiana Commission on Local Government Reform.

As a justice, he has authored more than 900 majority opinions. He has also published more than 65 law review articles.

Shepard retired March 23, 2012. Indiana Governor Mitch Daniels appointed Mark Massa to take Shepard's seat on the Court.

== Personal life ==
Shepard is married to Amy MacDonell and has one daughter, Martha, born in 1995. He occasionally teaches law at New York University and Yale Law School.

== See also ==
- List of justices of the Indiana Supreme Court

Legal offices
| Preceded by Richard M. Givan | Chief Justice of the Indiana Supreme Court; 1987–2012 | Succeeded by Brent Dickson |
