= Richard M. Givan =

American judge

Indiana Supreme Court Chief Justice
- In office 1974 – March, 1987
- Preceded by: Norman Arterburn
- Succeeded by: Randall Shepard

Indiana Supreme Court Justice
- In office January 6, 1969 – December 31, 1994
- Preceded by: David Lewis
- Succeeded by: Myra C. Selby

Personal details
- Born: June 7, 1921 Indianapolis, Indiana
- Died: July 22, 2009 (aged 88) Plainfield, Indiana
- Education: Indiana University
- Occupation: Lawyer; Judge

Richard Martin Givan (June 7, 1921 – July 22, 2009) served as the 96th Justice of the Indiana Supreme Court from January 6, 1969, until his retirement December 31, 1994. He served as chief justice from 1974 until March 1987.

== Early life ==
Givan was born June 7, 1921, in Indianapolis. He graduated from Decatur Central High School in Indianapolis in 1939. He received an LL.B. from Indiana University in 1951, and was admitted to the Indiana bar in 1952.

While he was a law student, he was assistant librarian for the Indiana Supreme Court in 1949, and then became a research assistant for the Indiana Supreme Court. He was appointed deputy public defender of Indiana after graduation from law school and served in that post until 1954.

== Career ==
From 1954 to 1966, he was Assistant Attorney General of Indiana, pleading cases before both the Indiana and Supreme Courts. In 1967, he was a representative and ranking member of the Judiciary Committee in the Indiana Legislature. He was elected to the Indiana Supreme Court in 1968 and served continuously until his retirement in December 1994. He was also chairman of the Board of Directors of the Indiana Judicial Conference from 1974 to 1987, served on the Board of Managers of the Indiana Judges Association from 1975 to 1987, and became an Indiana Judicial College Graduate in 1989.

In addition to his legal career, Givan served as a pilot in the U.S. United States Army Air Forces during World War II and was later a flight instructor with the Air Forces Reservists.

== Controversy ==
In 1984, a group known as "Remember Baby Doe - Retire Judge Givan Committee" sought to ouster Givan from his position as Chief Justice after the Indiana Supreme Court refused to hear a case regarding the death of an infant with Down syndrome. The group placed several advertisements in Indiana newspapers and asked voters to oppose Givan in the November 6 election. Givan denied claims that the decision established "quality of life" as a judicial criterion. Givan explained that the Supreme Court was only asked to determine if the original court had jurisdiction over the matter.

== Death ==
Richard Givan died on July 21, 2009, in Plainfield, Indiana. On July 23, 2009, Indiana Governor Mitch Daniels ordered all flags at the Statehouse and across the state be flown at half-mast as a tribute to Chief Justice Givan. The flags were to remain at half-mast through July 28, 2009, the date of Givan's funeral.

Political offices
Preceded by Norman Arterburn	Chief Justice of the Indiana Supreme Court; 1974–1987	Succeeded by Randall T. Shepard
