= History of metaphysics =

Study of the development of metaphysics

The history of metaphysics examines how theories about the most general features of reality ("metaphysics") have developed throughout history.

== Pre-history ==
Cognitive archeology such as analysis of cave paintings and other pre-historic art and customs suggests that a form of perennial philosophy or Shamanic metaphysics may stretch back to the birth of behavioral modernity, all around the world. Similar beliefs are found in present-day "stone age" cultures such as Australian aboriginals. Perennial philosophy postulates the existence of a spirit or concept world alongside the day-to-day world, and interactions between these worlds during dreaming and ritual, or on special days or at special places. It has been argued that perennial philosophy formed the basis for Platonism, with Plato articulating, rather than creating, much older widespread beliefs.

== Bronze Age ==
Bronze Age cultures such as ancient Mesopotamia and ancient Egypt (along with similarly structured but chronologically later cultures such as Mayans and Aztecs) developed belief systems based on mythology, anthropomorphic gods, mind–body dualism, and a spirit world, to explain causes and cosmology. These cultures appear to have been interested in astronomy and may have associated or identified the stars with some of these entities. In ancient Egypt, the ontological distinction between order (maat) and chaos (Isfet) seems to have been important.

== Pre-Socratic Greece ==
The circled dot was used by the Pythagoreans and later Greeks to represent the first metaphysical being, the Monad or The Absolute.

The first named Greek philosopher, according to Aristotle, is Thales of Miletus, early 6th century BCE. He made use of purely physical explanations to explain the phenomena of the world rather than the mythological and divine explanations of tradition. He is thought to have posited water as the single underlying principle (or arche in later Aristotelian terminology) of the material world. His fellow, but younger Miletians, Anaximander and Anaximenes, also posited monistic underlying principles, namely apeiron (the indefinite or boundless) and air respectively.

Another school was the Eleatics, in southern Italy. The group was founded in the early fifth century BCE by Parmenides, and included Zeno of Elea and Melissus of Samos. Methodologically, the Eleatics were broadly rationalist, and took logical standards of clarity and necessity to be the criteria of truth. Parmenides' chief doctrine was that reality is a single unchanging and universal Being. Zeno used reductio ad absurdum, to demonstrate the illusory nature of change and time in his paradoxes.

Heraclitus of Ephesus, in contrast, made change central, teaching that "all things flow". His philosophy, expressed in brief aphorisms, is cryptic. For instance, he also taught the unity of opposites.

Democritus and his teacher Leucippus, are known for formulating an atomic theory for the cosmos.

== Classical China ==
The modern "yin and yang symbol" (taijitu)

Metaphysics in Chinese philosophy can be traced back to the earliest Chinese philosophical concepts from the Zhou dynasty such as Tian (Heaven) and yin and yang. The fourth century BCE saw a turn towards cosmogony with the rise of Taoism (in the Daodejing and Zhuangzi) and sees the natural world as dynamic and constantly changing processes which spontaneously arise from a single immanent metaphysical source or principle (Tao). Another philosophical school which arose around this time was the School of Naturalists which saw the ultimate metaphysical principle as the Taiji, the "supreme polarity" composed of the forces of yin and yang which were always in a state of change seeking balance. Another concern of Chinese metaphysics, especially Taoism, is the relationship and nature of being and non-being (you 有 and wu 無). The Taoists held that the ultimate, the Tao, was also non-being or no-presence. Other important concepts were those of spontaneous generation or natural vitality (Ziran) and "correlative resonance" (Ganying).

After the fall of the Han dynasty (220 CE), China saw the rise of the Neo-Taoist Xuanxue school. This school was very influential in developing the concepts of later Chinese metaphysics. Buddhist philosophy entered China (c. 1st century) and was influenced by the native Chinese metaphysical concepts to develop new theories. The native Tiantai and Huayen schools of philosophy maintained and reinterpreted the Indian theories of shunyata (emptiness, kong 空) and Buddha-nature (Fo xing 佛性) into the theory of interpenetration of phenomena. Neo-Confucians like Zhang Zai under the influence of other schools developed the concepts of "principle" (li) and vital energy (qi).

== Classical Greece ==
=== Socrates and Plato ===
Plato is famous for his theory of forms (which he places in the mouth of Socrates in his dialogues). Platonic realism (also considered a form of idealism) is considered to be a solution to the problem of universals; i.e., what particular objects have in common is that they share a specific Form which is universal to all others of their respective kind.

The theory has a number of other aspects:

- Epistemological: knowledge of the Forms is more certain than mere sensory data.
- Ethical: The Form of the Good sets an objective standard for morality.
- Time and Change: The world of the Forms is eternal and unchanging. Time and change belong only to the lower sensory world. "Time is a moving image of Eternity".
- Abstract objects and mathematics: Numbers, geometrical figures, etc., exist mind-independently in the World of Forms.

Platonism developed into Neoplatonism, a philosophy with a monotheistic and mystical flavour that survived well into the early Christian era.

=== Aristotle ===
Plato's pupil Aristotle wrote widely on almost every subject, including metaphysics. His solution to the problem of universals contrasts with Plato's. Whereas Platonic Forms are existentially apparent in the visible world, Aristotelian essences dwell in particulars.

Potentiality and actuality are principles of a dichotomy which Aristotle used throughout his philosophical works to analyze motion, causality and other issues.

The Aristotelian theory of change and causality stretches to four causes: the material, formal, efficient and final. The efficient cause corresponds to what is now known as a cause simplicity. Final causes are explicitly teleological, a concept now regarded as controversial in science. The Matter/Form dichotomy was to become highly influential in later philosophy as the substance/essence distinction.

The opening arguments in Aristotle's Metaphysics, Book I, revolve around the senses, knowledge, experience, theory, and wisdom. The first main focus in the Metaphysics is attempting to determine how intellect "advances from sensation through memory, experience, and art, to theoretical knowledge". Aristotle claims that eyesight provides the capability to recognize and remember experiences, while sound allows learning.

== Classical India ==
=== Buddhism ===
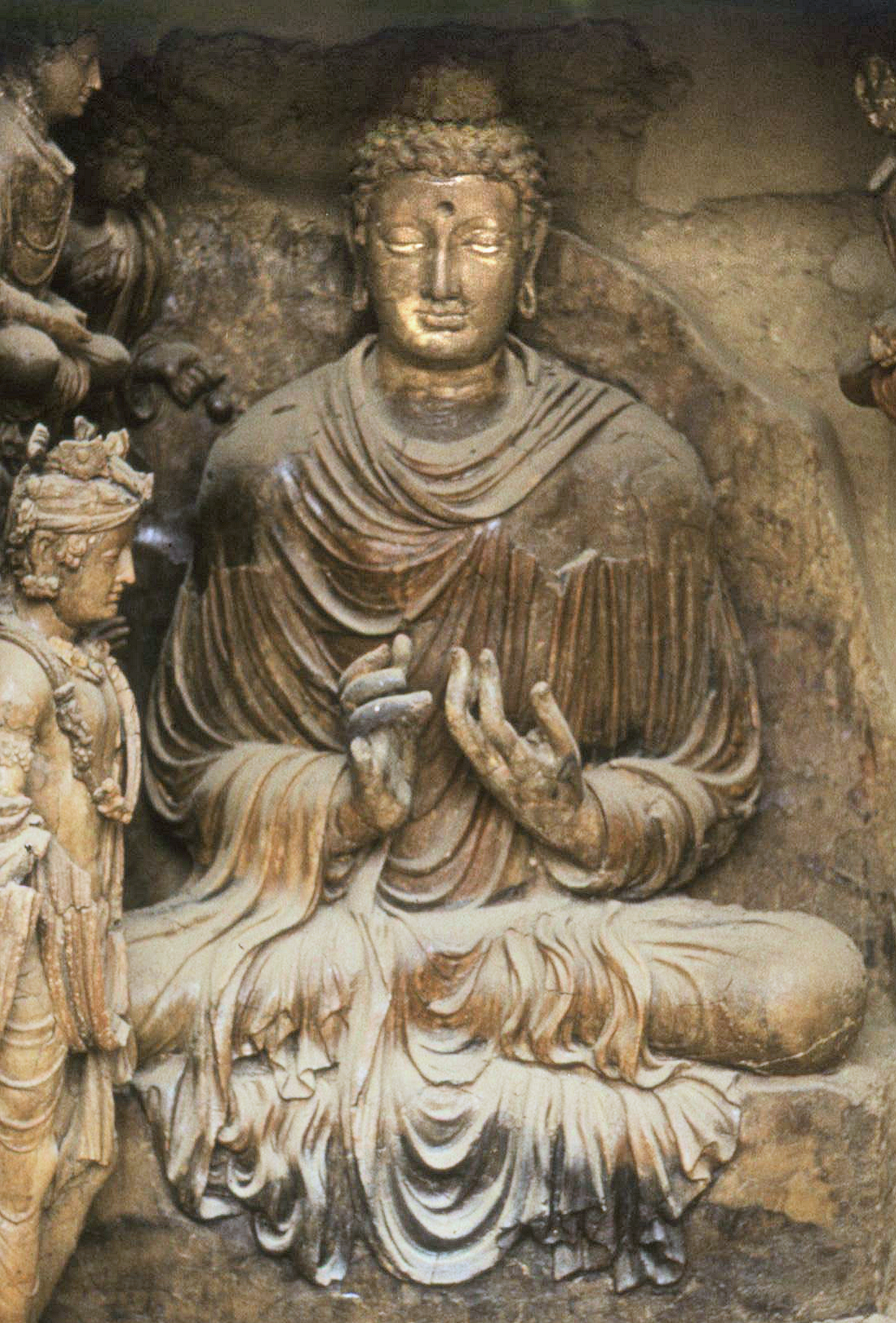
Seated Buddha from the Sarvāstivādin monastery of Tapa Shotor, 2nd century CE

In Indian Buddhism, the Mādhyamaka school of Buddhist philosophy developed the idea that all phenomena are inherently empty, without a permanent essence. The "consciousness-only" (vijñapti-mātra) doctrine of the Yogācāra school stated that experienced objects are mere transformations of consciousness, and do not reflect external reality. According to Buddhist philosophy, particularly after the rise of ancient Mahāyāna Buddhist scholarship, the concept of impermanence (anicca) is understood as one of the three marks of existence (trilakṣaṇa): there is neither empirical nor absolute permanent reality, because all phenomena are characterized by their lack of a solid and independent existence (svabhāva), and ontology can be explained as a process. (Note: Kalupahana describes how in Buddhism there is also a current which favours substance ontology. He sees Mādhyamaka and Yogācāra as reactions against developments toward substance ontology in Buddhism.) Advaita Vedānta and other schools of Hindu philosophy share numerous terminology, doctrines, and dialectical techniques with Buddhist philosophy. (Note: According to the Buddhist scholar O. Rozenberg, "a precise differentiation between Brahmanism and Buddhism is impossible to draw." T. R. V. Murti notices that "the ultimate goal" of Vedānta, Sāṃkhya, and Mahāyāna Buddhism is "remarkably similar"; while Advaita Vedānta postulates a "foundational self", according to Murti "Mahāyāna Buddhism implicitly affirms the existence of a deep underlying reality behind all empirical manifestations in its conception of śūnyatā (the indeterminate, the void), or vijñapti-mātra (consciousness only), or tathātā (thatness), or dhārmata (noumenal reality).") In Buddhist ontology, there is a system of dependent origination and interdependent phenomena (pratītya-samutpāda) but no stable persistent identities, neither eternal universals nor particulars. In Buddhism, thoughts and memories are mental constructions and fluid processes (skandhā) without a real observer, personal agent, or cognizer (anātman). By contrast, in Advaita Vedānta and the other orthodox schools of Hinduism, the eternal, unchanging ultimate self (ātman) identical with the ultimate reality (Brahman) is understood as the real observer, personal agent, and cognizer. However, the historical Buddha considered this Brahmanical belief to be one of the six wrong views about the self; in fact, Buddha held that attachment to the appearance of a permanent self in this world of change is the cause of suffering (duḥkha), and the main obstacle to the attainment of spiritual liberation (mokṣa).

In Buddhist philosophy, there are various metaphysical traditions that have proposed different questions about the nature of reality based on the teachings of the Buddha in the early Buddhist texts. The historical Buddha of the early texts does not focus on metaphysical questions but on ethical and spiritual training and in some cases, he dismisses certain metaphysical questions as unhelpful and indeterminate avyakta ("not manifest"), which he recommends should be set aside. The development of systematic metaphysics arose after the Buddha's death with the rise of the Abhidharma traditions. The Buddhist Abhidharma schools developed their analysis of reality based on the concept of interdependent phenomena (dhārmata), which are the ultimate physical and mental events that makeup experience and their relations to each other. Noa Ronkin has called their approach "phenomenological".

Later philosophical traditions include the Mādhyamaka school of Nāgārjuna within Mahāyāna Buddhism (3rd century CE), which further developed the theory of the emptiness (śūnyatā) of all interdependent phenomena (dhārmata), which rejects any kind of substance. This has been interpreted as a form of anti-foundationalism and anti-realism which sees reality as having no ultimate essence or ground. Meanwhile, the Yogācāra school promoted a theory called "consciousness-only" (vijñapti-mātra), which has been interpreted as a form of idealism or phenomenology and denies the split between awareness itself and the objects of awareness. In medieval China, the school of Xuanxue explored metaphysical problems of Mahāyāna Buddhist philosophy, such as the contrast between being and non-being.

=== Sāṃkhya ===
Sāṃkhya is an ancient system of Indian philosophy based on a dualism involving the ultimate principles of consciousness and matter. It is described as the rationalist school of Indian philosophy. It is most related to the Yoga philosophy of Hinduism, and its method was most influential on the development of Early Buddhism. The orthodox Hindu school of Sāṃkhya philosophy (Note: The ideas underlying Sāṃkhya philosophy arose as early as the 7th and 6th centuries BCE but its classical and systematic formulation is dated 350 CE.) introduced a metaphysical dualism with pure consciousness and matter as its fundamental categories.

The Sāmkhya is an enumerationist philosophy whose epistemology accepts three of six pramanas (proofs) as the only reliable means of gaining knowledge. These include pratyakṣa (perception), anumāṇa (inference) and śabda (āptavacana, word/testimony of reliable sources).

Sāṃkhya is a strongly dualistic school of thought. Sāmkhya philosophy regards the universe as consisting of two realities; puruṣa (consciousness) and prakṛti (matter). Jiva (a living being) is that state in which puruṣa is bonded to prakṛti in some form. This fusion, state the Samkhya scholars, led to the emergence of buddhi ("spiritual awareness") and ahaṅkāra (ego consciousness). The universe is described by this school as one created by purusa-prakṛti entities infused with various permutations and combinations of variously enumerated elements, senses, feelings, activity and mind. During the state of imbalance, one of more constituents overwhelm the others, creating a form of bondage, particularly of the mind. The end of this imbalance, bondage is called liberation, or moksha, by the Samkhya school.

The existence of God or supreme being is not directly asserted nor considered relevant by the Sāṃkhya philosophers, which deny the final cause of Ishvara (God). While the Samkhya school considers the Vedas as a reliable source of knowledge, it is an atheistic philosophy according to Paul Deussen and other scholars. A key difference between Samkhya and Yoga schools, state scholars, is that Yoga school accepts a "personal, yet essentially inactive, deity" or "personal god".

Samkhya is known for its theory of guṇas (qualities, innate tendencies). Guṇa, it states, are of three types: sattva being good, compassionate, illuminating, positive, and constructive; rajas is one of activity, chaotic, passion, impulsive, potentially good or bad; and tamas being the quality of darkness, ignorance, destructive, lethargic, negative. Everything, all life forms and human beings, state Samkhya scholars, have these three guṇas, but in different proportions. The interplay of these guṇas defines the character of someone or something, of nature and determines the progress of life. The Samkhya theory of guṇas was widely discussed, developed and refined by various schools of Indian philosophies, including Buddhism. Samkhya's philosophical treatises also influenced the development of various theories of Hindu ethics.

=== Vedānta ===
Realization of the nature of self-identity is the principal object of the Vedānta system of Indian metaphysics. In the Upanishads, self-consciousness is not the first-person indexical self-awareness or the self-awareness which is self-reference without identification, and also not the self-consciousness which as a kind of desire is satisfied by another self-consciousness. It is self-realisation; the realisation of the self consisting of consciousness that leads all else.

The word self-consciousness in the Upanishads means the knowledge about the existence and nature of manusya, human being. It means the consciousness of our own real being, the primary reality. Self-consciousness means self-knowledge, the knowledge of Prajna i.e. of Prana which is attained by a Brahman. According to the Upanishads the Atman or Paramatman is phenomenally unknowable; it is the object of realisation. The Atman is unknowable in its essential nature; it is unknowable in its essential nature because it is the eternal subject who knows about everything including itself. The Atman is the knower and also the known.

Metaphysicians regard the self either to be distinct from the absolute or entirely identical with the absolute. They have given form to three schools of thought – the dualistic school, the quasi-dualistic school and the monistic school, as the result of their varying mystical experiences. Prakrti and Atman, when treated as two separate and distinct aspects form the basis of the dualism of the Shvetashvatara Upanishad. Quasi-dualism is reflected in the Vaishnavite-monotheism of Ramanuja and the absolute monism, in the teachings of Adi Shankara.

Self-consciousness is the fourth state of consciousness or Turiya, the first three being Vaisvanara, Taijasa and Prajna. These are the four states of individual consciousness.

There are three distinct stages leading to self-realisation. The first stage is in mystically apprehending the glory of the self within one as though one were distinct from it. The second stage is in identifying the "I-within" with the self, that one is in essential nature entirely identical with the pure self. The third stage is in realising that the Atman is Brahman, that there is no difference between the self and the absolute. The fourth stage is in realising "I am the Absolute" – Aham Brahman Asmi. The fifth stage is in realising that Brahman is the "all" that exists, as also that which does not exist.

== Islamic metaphysics ==
Major ideas in Islamic metaphysics (Arabic: ما وراء الطبيعة, romanized: Mawaraultabia) have surrounded the concept of weḥdah (وحدة) meaning 'unity', or in Arabic توحيد tawhid. Waḥdat al-wujūd literally means the 'unity of existence' or 'unity of being'. In modern times the phrase has been translated as "pantheism." Wujud (i.e. existence or presence) here refers to Allah's wujud (compare tawhid). However, waḥdat ash-shuhūd, meaning 'apparentism' or 'monotheism of witness', holds that god and his creation are entirely separate.

== Continental rationalism ==
In the early modern period (17th and 18th centuries), the system-building scope of philosophy is often linked to the rationalist method of philosophy, that is the technique of deducing the nature of the world by pure reason. The scholastic concepts of substance and accident were employed.

- Leibniz proposed in his Monadology a plurality of non-interacting substances.
- Descartes is famous for his dualism of material and mental substances.
- Spinoza believed reality was a single substance of God-or-nature.

Christian Wolff had theoretical philosophy divided into an ontology or philosophia prima as a general metaphysics, which arises as a preliminary to the distinction of the three "special metaphysics" on the soul, world and God: rational psychology, rational cosmology and rational theology. The three disciplines are called empirical and rational because they are independent of revelation. This scheme, which is the counterpart of religious tripartition in creature, creation, and Creator, is best known to philosophical students by Kant's treatment of it in the Critique of Pure Reason. In the "Preface" of the 2nd edition of Kant's book, Wolff is defined "the greatest of all dogmatic philosophers."

== British empiricism ==
British empiricism marked something of a reaction to rationalist and system-building metaphysics, or speculative metaphysics as it was pejoratively termed. The skeptic David Hume famously declared that most metaphysics should be consigned to the flames (see below). Hume was notorious among his contemporaries as one of the first philosophers to openly doubt religion, but is better known now for his critique of causality. John Stuart Mill, Thomas Reid and John Locke were less skeptical, embracing a more cautious style of metaphysics based on realism, common sense and science. Other philosophers, notably George Berkeley were led from empiricism to idealistic metaphysics.

== Kant ==
Immanuel Kant attempted a grand synthesis and revision of the trends already mentioned: scholastic philosophy, systematic metaphysics, and skeptical empiricism, not to forget the burgeoning science of his day. As did the systems builders, he had an overarching framework in which all questions were to be addressed. Like Hume, who famously woke him from his 'dogmatic slumbers', he was suspicious of metaphysical speculation, and also placed much emphasis on the limitations of the human mind. Kant described his shift in metaphysics away from making claims about an objective noumenal world, towards exploring the subjective phenomenal world, as a Copernican Revolution, by analogy to (though opposite in direction to) Copernicus' shift from man (the subject) to the sun (an object) at the center of the universe.

Kant saw rationalist philosophers as aiming for a kind of metaphysical knowledge he defined as the synthetic apriori—that is knowledge that does not come from the senses (it is a priori) but is nonetheless about reality (synthetic). Inasmuch as it is about reality, it differs from abstract mathematical propositions (which he terms synthetic apriori), and being apriori it is distinct from empirical, scientific knowledge (which he termed synthetic aposteriori). The only synthetic apriori knowledge we can have is of how our minds organise the data of the senses; that organising framework is space and time, which for Kant have no mind-independent existence, but nonetheless operate uniformly in all humans. Apriori knowledge of space and time is all that remains of metaphysics as traditionally conceived. There is a reality beyond sensory data or phenomena, which he calls the realm of noumena; however, we cannot know it as it is in itself, but only as it appears to us. He allows himself to speculate that the origins of phenomenal God, morality, and free will might exist in the noumenal realm, but these possibilities have to be set against its basic unknowability for humans. Although he saw himself as having disposed of metaphysics, in a sense, he has generally been regarded in retrospect as having a metaphysics of his own, and as beginning the modern analytical conception of the subject.

== Late modern philosophy ==
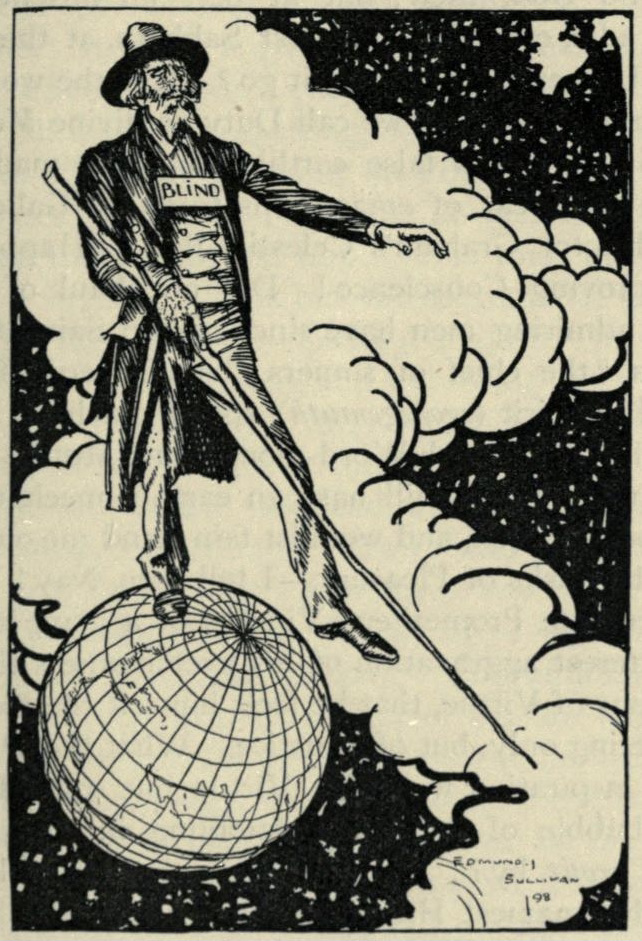
"Metaphysics", 1898 illustration by E. J. Sullivan from Sartor Resartus (1833–34) by Thomas Carlyle

Nineteenth-century philosophy was overwhelmingly influenced by Kant and his successors. Schopenhauer, Schelling, Fichte and Hegel all purveyed their own panoramic versions of German Idealism, Kant's own caution about metaphysical speculation, and refutation of idealism, having fallen by the wayside. The idealistic impulse continued into the early twentieth century with British idealists such as F. H. Bradley and J. M. E. McTaggart. Followers of Karl Marx took Hegel's dialectic view of history and re-fashioned it as materialism.

== Early analytic philosophy and positivism ==
During the period when idealism was dominant in philosophy, science had been making great advances. The arrival of a new generation of scientifically minded philosophers led to a sharp decline in the popularity of idealism during the 1920s.

Analytic philosophy was spearheaded by Bertrand Russell and G. E. Moore. Russell and William James tried to compromise between idealism and materialism with the theory of neutral monism.

The early to mid-twentieth-century philosophy saw a trend to reject metaphysical questions as meaningless. The driving force behind this tendency was the philosophy of logical positivism as espoused by the Vienna Circle, which argued that the meaning of a statement was its prediction of observable results of an experiment, and thus that there is no need to postulate the existence of any objects other than these perceptual observations.

At around the same time, the American pragmatists were steering a middle course between materialism and idealism. System-building metaphysics, with a fresh inspiration from science, was revived by A. N. Whitehead and Charles Hartshorne.

== Continental philosophy ==
The forces that shaped analytic philosophy—the break with idealism, and the influence of science—were much less significant outside the English speaking world, although there was a shared turn toward language. Continental philosophy continued in a trajectory from post Kantianism.

The phenomenology of Husserl and others was intended as a collaborative project for the investigation of the features and structure of consciousness common to all humans, in line with Kant's basing his synthetic apriori on the uniform operation of consciousness. It was officially neutral with regards to ontology, but was nonetheless to spawn a number of metaphysical systems. Brentano's concept of intentionality would become widely influential, including on analytic philosophy.

Heidegger, author of Being and Time, saw himself as re-focusing on Being-qua-being, introducing the novel concept of Dasein in the process. Classing himself an existentialist, Sartre wrote an extensive study of Being and Nothingness.

The speculative realism movement marks a return to full blooded realism.

== Process metaphysics ==
There are two fundamental aspects of everyday experience: change and persistence. Until recently, the Western philosophical tradition has arguably championed substance and persistence, with some notable exceptions, however. According to process thinkers, novelty, flux and accident do matter, and sometimes they constitute the ultimate reality.

In a broad sense, process metaphysics is as old as Western philosophy, with figures such as Heraclitus, Plotinus, Duns Scotus, Leibniz, David Hume, Georg Wilhelm Friedrich Hegel, Friedrich Wilhelm Joseph von Schelling, Gustav Theodor Fechner, Friedrich Adolf Trendelenburg, Charles Renouvier, Karl Marx, Ernst Mach, Friedrich Wilhelm Nietzsche, Émile Boutroux, Henri Bergson, Samuel Alexander and Nicolas Berdyaev. It seemingly remains an open question whether major "Continental" figures such as the late Martin Heidegger, Maurice Merleau-Ponty, Gilles Deleuze, Michel Foucault, or Jacques Derrida should be included.

In a strict sense, process metaphysics may be limited to the works of a few philosophers:

- G. W. F. Hegel,
- Charles Sanders Peirce,
- William James,
- Henri Bergson,
- A. N. Whitehead, and
- John Dewey.

From a European perspective, there was a very significant and early Whiteheadian influence on the works of outstanding scholars such as:

- Émile Meyerson (1859–1933),
- Louis Couturat (1868–1914),
- Jean Wahl (1888–1974),
- R. G. Collingwood (1889–1943),
- Philippe Devaux (1902–1979),
- Hans Jonas (1903–1993),
- Dorothy M. Emmett (1904–2000),
- Maurice Merleau Ponty (1908–1961),
- Enzo Paci (1911–1976),
- Charlie Dunbar Broad (1887–1971),
- Wolfe Mays (1912–2005),
- Ilya Prigogine (1917–2003),
- Jules Vuillemin (1920–2001),
- Jean Ladrière (1921–2007),
- Gilles Deleuze (1925–1995),
- Wolfhart Pannenberg (1928–2014),
- Reiner Wiehl (1929–2010), and
- Alain Badiou (1937–).

== Contemporary analytic philosophy ==
While early analytic philosophy tended to reject metaphysical theorizing, under the influence of logical positivism, it was revived in the second half of the twentieth century. Philosophers such as David K. Lewis and David Armstrong developed elaborate theories on a range of topics such as universals, causation, possibility and necessity and abstract objects. However, the focus of analytic philosophy generally is away from the construction of all-encompassing systems and toward close analysis of individual ideas.

Among the developments that led to the revival of metaphysical theorizing were Quine's attack on the analytic–synthetic distinction, which was generally taken to undermine Carnap's distinction between existence questions internal to a framework and those external to it.

Discussions regarding the philosophy of fiction, semiotics, existence as property, free will, possible multiple worlds, and the philosophy of time have been popularized.

The analytic view is of metaphysics as studying phenomenal human concepts rather than making claims about the noumenal world, so its style often blurs into philosophy of language and introspective psychology. Compared to system-building, it can seem very dry, stylistically similar to computer programming, mathematics or even accountancy (as a common stated goal is to "account for" entities in the world).

== Sources ==
- Chai, David (2020). Dao Companion to Xuanxue 玄學 (Neo-Daoism). Springer. ISBN 978-3-030-49228-1.
- Depraz, Nathalie; Varela, Francisco J.; Vermersch, Pierre (2003). On Becoming Aware: A Pragmatics of Experiencing. John Benjamins Publishing. ISBN 978-90-272-9683-2.
- Deutsch, Eliot; Dalvi, Rohit (2004), The Essential Vedanta: A New Source Book of Advaita Vedanta, World Wisdom, Inc., ISBN 9780941532525
- Grayling, A. C. (2019). The History of Philosophy. Penguin UK. ISBN 978-0-241-98086-6.
- Isaeva, N.V. (1993), Shankara and Indian Philosophy, SUNY Press
- Kalupahana, David J. (1994), A history of Buddhist philosophy, Delhi: Motilal Banarsidass Publishers Private Limited
- Moore, A. W. (2011-12-12). The Evolution of Modern Metaphysics. Cambridge; New York: Cambridge University Press. ISBN 978-0-521-85111-4.
- Murti, T.R.V. (1983), "The World and the Individual in Indian Religious Thought", Studies in Indian Thought: Collected Papers of Prof. T.R.V. Murti, Motilal Banarsidass Publ.
- Puligandla, Ramakrishna (1997), Fundamentals of Indian Philosophy, New Delhi: D.K. Printworld (P) Ltd., ISBN 9788124600870
- Robinet, Isabelle (2013). "Chongxuan". In Pregadio, Fabrizio (ed.). The Encyclopedia of Taoism. Routledge. pp. 274–276. ISBN 978-1-135-79634-1.
- Ruzsa, Ferenc. "Sankhya". Internet Encyclopedia of Philosophy. Archived from the original on 19 May 2019.
- Shun'ei, Tagawa (2014). Living Yogacara: An Introduction to Consciousness-Only Buddhism. Simon and Schuster. ISBN 978-0-86171-895-5.
- Williams, Paul; Tribe, Anthony; Wynne, Alexander (2000). Buddhist Thought: A Complete Introduction to the Indian Tradition. Routledge. ISBN 0-415-20701-0.
