= Dai Lewis (footballer) =

Welsh footballer

Personal information
- Date of birth: 2 February 1912
- Place of birth: Wales

International career
Years	Team	Apps	(Gls)
1932	Wales	2	(0)

Dai Lewis (born 2 February 1912, date of death unknown) was a Welsh international footballer. He was part of the Wales national football team, playing 2 matches. He played his first match on 26 October 1932 against Scotland and his last match on 16 November 1932 against England.

== See also ==
- List of Wales international footballers (alphabetical)
