= David Lewis (Indiana judge) =

American judge (1909–1985)

David M. Lewis (March 15, 1909 – September 24, 1985) was a justice of the Indiana Supreme Court from June 21, 1967, to January 6, 1969.

== Life and career ==
Born in Indianapolis, Lewis received an undergraduate degree from DePauw University and a Juris Doctor degree from the University of Chicago Law School, gaining admission to the bar in Indiana in 1932. From 1938 to 1940, he served as county prosecutor for Marion County, Indiana. He was also active in Democratic Party politics, serving two terms as the chairman for the party in Marion County. In 1967, Governor Roger D. Branigin appointed Lewis to a seat on the Indiana Supreme Court vacated by the death of Justice Walter Myers Jr., but Lewis declined to run for reelection at the expiration of the term in 1969, returning to private practice until his retirement in 1972.

After his retirement, Lewis moved to Asheville, North Carolina, where he died in a hospital at the age of 76.

Political offices
Preceded by Walter Myers Jr.	Justice of the Indiana Supreme Court; 1967–1969	Succeeded by Richard M. Givan
