= David Emrys Lewis =

Welsh poet and journalist

David Emrys Lewis (1887 – 12 March 1954) was a Welsh poet and journalist.

He was born in 1887 at Machynlleth and he attended school there. He started his career in journalism by researching and writing for Montgomeryshire County Times but moved to Port Talbot in 1916 where he worked at the Cambrian Daily Leader. He later joined the staff of the Western Mail and also worked for several other newspapers in South Wales. He won the crown at Neath National Eisteddfod in 1918. He married a woman named Margaret who was also from Machynlleth. They had two sons.

Lewis died due to a grave illness at Gendros, Swansea, on 12 March 1954, at age 67.
