= David Lewis (rugby league) =

Welsh rugby league footballer

David J. Lewis
Personal information
- Full name: David Lewis
- Born: Wales
- Died: unknown

Playing information
- Position: Wing
Club
Years	Team	Pld	T	G	FG	P
1903–06	Oldham	26	5			15
Representative
Years	Team	Pld	T	G	FG	P
1904	Other Nationalities	1

David J. Lewis (birth unknown – death unknown) was a Welsh professional rugby league footballer who played in the 1900s. He played at representative level for Other Nationalities, and at club level for Oldham, as a wing.

== Playing career ==
=== International honours ===
David Lewis won a cap, playing on the wing for Other Nationalities in the 9–3 victory over England at Central Park, Wigan on Tuesday 5 April 1904, in the first ever international rugby league match.

=== Championship appearances ===
David Lewis played in Oldham's victory in the Championship during the 1904–05 season.
