= David A. Lewis =

American psychiatrist and neuroscientist

David A. Lewis is an American psychiatrist and neuroscientist, currently a Distinguished Professor of Psychiatry and Neuroscience, Thomas Detre Professor of Academic Psychiatry and also Director of Conte Center for Translational Mental Health Research at University of Pittsburgh.
