= Walter Myers Jr. =

American judge (1914–1967)

The Honorable Walter Dennis Myers Jr.

Justice of the Indiana Supreme Court
- In office January 7, 1963 – June 2, 1967
- Preceded by: Arch Bobbitt
- Succeeded by: David Lewis

Personal details
- Born: June 9, 1914 Indianapolis, Indiana, U.S.
- Died: June 2, 1967 (aged 52)
- Party: Democratic
- Parent(s): Walter Dennis Myers Sr. and Katherine Lyons
- Education: Yale University (BA, JD)
- Profession: Lawyer, judge

Walter Dennis Myers Jr. (June 9, 1914 – June 2, 1967) was an American lawyer, politician, and judge who served as a justice of the Indiana Supreme Court from January 7, 1963, until his death on June 2, 1967.

== Biography ==
Myers was born in Indianapolis, Indiana, the son of Walter Dennis Myers and Katherine Lyons. His father, originally from Perry County, Pennsylvania, was a World War I veteran and a Democratic politician who served in the Indiana House of Representatives and as U.S. Assistant Postmaster General from 1940 to 1953 under Franklin Roosevelt and Harry Truman.

Myers graduated from Shortridge High School, where he ran for class president. He then attended Yale University in New Haven, Connecticut, earning his bachelor's degree in 1935 and his Juris Doctor degree from Yale Law School in 1938.

Myers returned to Indianapolis and opened a legal practice in 1939. Beginning in 1943, he taught business law at Butler University. Myers was initiated into the Tau Kappa Epsilon fraternity at Butler University.

In 1958, Myers was elected as a judge of the Indiana Appellate Court, serving until 1962.

Myers was an active member of the Indiana State Bar Association, serving on its Committee on Illegal Practice of Law and Grievances.

In 1963, Myers became a justice of the Indiana Supreme Court, succeeding Justice Arch Bobbitt. Myers died in office and was succeeded by Justice David Lewis.

Political offices
Preceded by Arch Bobbitt	Justice of the Indiana Supreme Court; 1963–1967	Succeeded by David Lewis
