= Bare Necessities =

Bare Necessities may refer to:

- "The Bare Necessities", a song from the 1967 animated feature The Jungle Book
- Bare Necessities (TV series), a 1999–2001 BBC2 television survival show
- Bare Necessities (company), a clothing retailer

== See also ==
- The Bear Necessities, an a cappella group
