= David Lewis (cricketer, born 1940) =

Welsh cricketer (1940–2026)

David Wyndham Lewis (18 December 1940 – 11 May 2026) was a Welsh cricketer active from 1960 to 1973 who played for Glamorgan and Transvaal.

== Biography ==
Lewis was born in Cardiff on 18 December 1940. He appeared in 14 first-class matches as a righthanded batsman who bowled leg break and googly. He scored 122 runs with a highest score of 29* and took 21 wickets with a best performance of four for 42. Lewis died on 11 May 2026, aged 85.
