= Arch Bobbitt =

American judge (1895–1978)

Honorable Arch Newton Bobbitt

Justice of the Indiana Supreme Court
- In office January 2, 1951 – January 7, 1963

Chief City Attorney, Indianapolis
- In office 1945–1948

Indiana State Auditor
- In office 1928–1930

Crawford County Auditor
- In office 1921–1925

Personal details
- Born: September 3, 1895 Eckerty, Indiana
- Died: January 24, 1978 (aged 82)
- Education: Benjamin Harrison Law School
- Profession: Judge, prosecutor, attorney, local government official

Arch Newton Bobbitt (September 3, 1895 – January 24, 1978) was a justice of the Indiana Supreme Court from January 2, 1951, to January 7, 1963.

Born in Eckerty, Crawford County, Indiana, Bobbit graduated from Birdseye High School, and attended Central Normal College in Danville, Indiana. After working as a school teacher and principal for a year, he was elected Crawford County Clerk in 1918, but resigned that office to serve in the United States Navy during World War I.

Bobbitt was the Crawford County Auditor from 1921 to 1925, and a gasoline tax collector from 1925 to 1929. In 1927, he received an LL.B. from the Benjamin Harrison Law School. He was elected State Auditor, "where he uncovered a gasoline bootlegging scheme and recovered evaded taxes".

From 1937 to 1942, Bobbitt was chair of the Republican Party in Indiana, which had suffered substantial losses in the national Democratic surge brought on by the Great Depression. Bobbitt discussed the low Republican morale at the time with Homer E. Capehart, and approved Capehart's proposal to hold a massive "cornfield convention" in the state, drawing national participation and attention, and helping to restore the party's fortunes.

From 1943 to 1948, Bobbitt was a city attorney for Indianapolis, and was chief city attorney for the last three years of that service. In 1950, Bobbitt was elected to the Indiana Supreme Court, assuming office on January 1, 1951, and immediately commencing a rotation as chief justice. Bobbit was defeated in his 1963 bid for re-election, thereafter returning to private practice.

Political offices
| Preceded by Lewis S. Bowman | Indiana State Auditor; 1928–1930 | Succeeded by Floyd E. Williamson |
| Preceded by Howard Young Sr. | Justice of the Indiana Supreme Court; 1951–1963 | Succeeded by Walter Myers Jr. |
