= Four-dimensionalism =

Philosophical treatment of time, an object's persistence across it, and reality

In philosophy, four-dimensionalism (also known as the doctrine of temporal parts) is the ontological position that an object's persistence through time is like its extension through space. Thus, an object that exists in time has temporal parts in the various subregions of the total region of time it occupies, just like an object that exists in a region of space has at least one part in every subregion of that space.

Four-dimensionalists typically argue for treating time as analogous to space, usually leading them to endorse the doctrine of eternalism. This is a philosophical approach to the ontological nature of time, according to which all points in time are equally "real", as opposed to the presentist idea that only the present is real. As some eternalists argue by analogy, just as all spatially distant objects and events are as real as those close to us, temporally distant objects and events are as real as those currently present to us.

Perdurantism—or perdurance theory—is a closely related philosophical theory of persistence and identity, according to which an individual has distinct temporal parts throughout its existence, and the persisting object is the sum or set of all of its temporal parts. This sum or set is colloquially referred to as a "space-time worm", which has earned the perdurantist view the moniker of "the worm view". While all perdurantists are plausibly considered four-dimensionalists, at least one variety of four dimensionalism does not count as perdurantist in nature. This variety, known as exdurantism or the "stage view", is closely akin to the perdurantist position. They also countenance a view of persisting objects that have temporal parts that succeed one another through time. However, instead of identifying the persisting object as the entire set or sum of its temporal parts, the exdurantist argues that any object under discussion is a single stage (time-slice, temporal part, etc.), and that the other stages or parts that comprise the persisting object are related to that part by a "temporal counterpart" relation.

Though they have often been conflated, eternalism is a theory of what time is like and what times exist, while perdurantism is a theory about persisting objects and their identity conditions over time. Eternalism and perdurantism tend to be discussed together because many philosophers argue for a combination of eternalism and perdurantism. Sider (1997) uses the term four-dimensionalism to refer to perdurantism, but Michael Rea uses the term "four-dimensionalism" to mean the view that presentism is false as opposed to "perdurantism", the view that endurantism is false and persisting objects have temporal parts.

== Four-dimensionalism about material objects ==
Four-dimensionalism is a name for different positions. One of these uses four-dimensionalism as a position of material objects with respect to dimensions. Four-dimensionalism is the view that in addition to spatial parts, objects have temporal parts.

According to this view, four-dimensionalism cannot be used as a synonym for perdurantism. Perdurantists have to hold a four-dimensional view of material objects: it is impossible that perdurantists, who believe that objects persist by having different temporal parts at different times, do not believe in temporal parts. However, the reverse is not true. Four-dimensionalism is compatible with either perdurantism or exdurantism.

== A-series and B-series ==
J.M.E. McTaggart in The Unreality of Time identified two descriptions of time, which he called the A-series and the B-series. The A-series identifies positions in time as past, present, or future, and thus assumes that the "present" has some objective reality, as in both presentism and the growing block universe. The B-series defines a given event as earlier or later than another event, but does not assume an objective present, as in four-dimensionalism. Much of the contemporary literature in the metaphysics of time has been taken to spring forth from this distinction, and thus takes McTaggart's work as its starting point.

== Contrast with three-dimensionalism ==
Unlike the four-dimensionalist, the three-dimensionalist considers time to be a unique dimension that is not analogous to the three spatial dimensions: length, width and height. Whereas the four-dimensionalist proposes that objects are extended across time, the three-dimensionalist adheres to the belief that all objects are wholly present at any moment at which they exist. While the three-dimensionalist agrees that the parts of an object can be differentiated based on their spatial dimensions, they do not believe an object can be differentiated into temporal parts across time. For example, in the three-dimensionalist account, "Descartes in 1635" is the same object as "Descartes in 1620", and both are identical to Descartes, himself. However, the four-dimensionalist considers these to be distinct temporal parts.

== Prominent arguments in favor of four-dimensionalism ==
Several lines of argumentation have been advanced in favor of four-dimensionalism:

Firstly, four-dimensional accounts of time are argued to better explain paradoxes of change over time (often referred to as the paradox of the Ship of Theseus) than three-dimensional theories. A contemporary account of this paradox is introduced in Ney (2014), but the original problem has its roots in Greek antiquity. A typical Ship of Theseus paradox involves taking some changeable object with multiple material parts, for example a ship, then sequentially removing and replacing its parts until none of the original components are left. At each stage of the replacement, the ship is presumably identical with the original, since the replacement of a single part need not destroy the ship and create an entirely new one. But, it is also plausible that an object with none of the same material parts as another is not identical with the original object. So, how can an object survive the replacement of any of its parts, and in fact all of its parts? The four-dimensionalist can argue that the persisting object is a single space-time worm which has all the replacement stages as temporal parts, or in the case of the stage view that each succeeding stage bears a temporal counterpart relation to the original stage under discussion.

Secondly, problems of temporary intrinsics are argued to be best explained by four-dimensional views of time that involve temporal parts. As presented by David Lewis, the problem of temporary intrinsics involves properties of an object that are both had by that object regardless of how anything else in the world is (and thus intrinsic), and subject to change over time (thus temporary). Shape is argued to be one such property. So, if an object is capable of having a particular shape, and also changing its shape at another time, there must be some way for the same object to be, say, both round and square. Lewis argues that separate temporal parts having the incompatible properties best explains an object being able to change its shape in this way, because other accounts of three-dimensional time eliminate intrinsic properties by indexing them to times and making them relational instead of intrinsic.

== See also ==
- Extended modal realism
- Four-dimensional space
- Light cone
- Multiple occupancy view
- Rietdijk–Putnam argument advocating this position
- Spacetime
- World line

== Sources ==
- Armstrong, David M. (1980) "Identity Through Time", pages 67,8 in Peter van Inwagen (editor), Time and Cause, D. Reidel.
- Hughes, C. (1986) "Is a Thing Just the Sum of Its Parts?", Proceedings of the Aristotelian Society 85: 213-33.
- Heller, Mark (1984). "Temporal Parts of Four Dimensional Objects", Philosophical Studies 46: 323-34. Reprinted in Rea 1997: 12.-330.
- Heller, Mark (1990) The Ontology of Physical Objects: Four-dimensional Hunks of Matter, Cambridge University Press.
- Heller, Mark (1992) "Things Change", Philosophy and Phenomenological Research 52: 695-304
- Heller, Mark (1993) "Varieties of Four Dimensionalism", Australasian Journal of Philosophy 71: 47-59.
- Lewis, David (1983). "Survival and Identity", in Philosophical Papers, Volume 1, 55-7. Oxford University Press. With postscripts. Originally published in Amelie O. Rorty, editor (1976) The Identities of Persons University of California Press, pages 17-40.
- Lewis, David (1986a). On the Plurality of Worlds. Oxford: Basil Blackwell.
- Lewis, David (1986b). Philosophical Papers, Volume 2. Oxford: Oxford University Press.
- McTaggart John Ellis (1908) The Unreality of time, originally published in Mind: A Quarterly Review of Psychology and Philosophy 17: 456-473.
- Lewis, D. (1976) "Survival and identity", pages 17-40 in Rorty, A.O. editor, The identities of persons. Berkeley: University of California Press. Google books
- Markosian, N. (2004) "A defense of presentism", pages 47-82 in Zimmerman, D.W. editor, Oxford Studies in Metaphysics, Volume 1, Oxford University Press. Google books
- Muis, R. (2005) Review of Four-dimensionalism: an ontology of persistence and time by Theodore Sider, Ars Disputandi 5
- Robinson, D. (1985) "Can amoebae divide without multiplying?", Australasian Journal of Philosophy 63(3): 299–319. doi:10.1080/00048408512341901
