= Impossible world =

Term used to model separate circumstances that cannot exist together

In philosophical logic, the concept of an impossible world (sometimes called a non-normal world) is used to model certain phenomena that cannot be adequately handled using ordinary possible worlds. An impossible world, $i$, is the same sort of thing as a possible world $w$ (whatever that may be), except that it is in some sense "impossible." Depending on the context, this may mean that some contradictions, statements of the form $p \land \lnot p$ are true at $i$, or that the normal laws of logic, metaphysics, and mathematics, fail to hold at $i$, or both. Impossible worlds are controversial objects in philosophy, logic, and semantics. They have been around since the advent of possible world semantics for modal logic, as well as world based semantics for non-classical logics, but have yet to find the ubiquitous acceptance, that their possible counterparts have found in all walks of philosophy.

== Argument from ways ==
=== Possible worlds ===
Possible worlds are often regarded with suspicion, which is why their proponents have struggled to find arguments in their favor. An often-cited argument is called the argument from ways. It defines possible worlds as "ways how things could have been" and relies for its premises and inferences on assumptions from natural language, for example:

(1) Hillary Clinton could have won the 2016 US election.
(2) So there are other ways how things could have been.
(3) Possible worlds are ways how things could have been.
(4) So there are other possible worlds.

The central step of this argument happens at (2) where the plausible (1) is interpreted in a way that involves quantification over "ways". Many philosophers, following Willard Van Orman Quine, hold that quantification entails ontological commitments, in this case, a commitment to the existence of possible worlds. Quine himself restricted his method to scientific theories, but others have applied it also to natural language, for example, Amie L. Thomasson in her paper entitled Ontology Made Easy. The strength of the argument from ways depends on these assumptions and may be challenged by casting doubt on the quantifier-method of ontology or on the reliability of natural language as a guide to ontology.

=== Impossible worlds ===
A similar argument can be used to justify the thesis that there are impossible worlds, for example:

(a) Hillary Clinton couldn't have both won and lost the 2016 US election.
(b) So there are ways how things couldn't have been.
(c) Impossible worlds are ways how things couldn't have been.
(d) So there are impossible worlds.

The problem for the defender of possible worlds is that language is ambiguous concerning the meaning of (a): does it mean that this is a way how things couldn't be or that this is not a way how things could be. It is open to critics of impossible worlds to assert the latter option, which would invalidate the argument.

== Applications ==
=== Non-normal modal logics ===
Non-normal worlds were introduced by Saul Kripke in 1965 as a purely technical device to provide semantics for modal logics weaker than the system K — in particular, modal logics that reject the rule of necessitation:

$$\vdash A \Rightarrow \ \vdash \Box A$$.

Such logics are typically referred to as "non-normal." Under the standard interpretation of modal vocabulary in Kripke semantics, we have $\vdash A$ if and only if in each model, $A$ holds in all worlds. To construct a model in which $A$ holds in all worlds but $\Box A$ does not, we need either to interpret $\Box$ in a non-standard manner (that is, we do not just consider the truth of $A$ in every accessible world), or we reinterpret the condition for being valid. This latter choice is what Kripke does. We single out a class of worlds as normal, and we take validity to be truth in every normal world in a model. in this way we may construct a model in which $A$ is true in every normal world, but in which $\Box A$ is not. We need only ensure that this world (at which $\Box A$ fails) have an accessible world which is not normal. Here, $A$ can fail, and hence, at our original world, $\Box A$ fails to be necessary, despite being a truth of the logic.

These non-normal worlds are impossible in the sense that they are not constrained by what is true according to the logic. From the fact that $\vdash A$, it does not follow that $A$ holds in a non-normal world.

For more discussion of the interpretation of the language of modal logic in models with worlds, see the entries on modal logic and on Kripke semantics.

=== Avoiding Curry's paradox ===
Curry's paradox is a serious problem for logicians who are interested in developing formal languages that are "semantically closed" (i.e. that can express their own semantics). The paradox relies on the seemingly obvious principle of contraction:

$$(A \rightarrow (A \rightarrow B)) \rightarrow (A \rightarrow B)$$.

There are ways of using non-normal worlds in a semantical system that invalidate contraction. Moreover, these methods can be given a reasonable philosophical justification by construing non-normal worlds as worlds at which "the laws of logic fail."

=== Counternecessary statements ===
A counternecessary statement is a counterfactual conditional whose antecedent is not merely false, but necessarily so (or whose consequent is necessarily true).

For the sake of argument, assume that either (or both) of the following are the case:

1. Intuitionism is false.
2. The law of excluded middle is true.

Presumably each of these statements is such that if it is true (false), then it is necessarily true (false).

Thus one (or both) of the following is being assumed:

1′. Intuitionism is false at every possible world.
2′. The law of excluded middle is true at every possible world.

Now consider the following:

3. If intuitionism is true, then the law of excluded middle holds.

This is intuitively false, as one of the fundamental tenets of intuitionism is precisely that the LEM does not hold. Suppose this statement is cashed out as:

3′. Every possible world at which intuitionism is true is a possible world at which the law of excluded middle holds true.

This holds vacuously, given either (1′) or (2′).

Now suppose impossible worlds are considered in addition to possible ones. It is compatible with (1′) that there are impossible worlds at which intuitionism is true, and with (2′) that there are impossible worlds at which the LEM is false. This yields the interpretation:

3*. Every (possible or impossible) world at which intuitionism is true is a (possible or impossible) world at which the law of excluded middle holds.

This does not seem to be the case, for intuitively there are impossible worlds at which intuitionism is true and the law of excluded middle does not hold.

== See also ==
- Possible world
- Modal realism
- Extended modal realism

== Bibliography ==
- Kripke, Saul. 1965. Semantical analysis of modal logic, II: non-normal modal propositional calculi. In J.W. Addison, L. Henkin, and A. Tarski, eds., The Theory of Models. Amsterdam: North Holland.
- Priest, Graham (ed.). 1997. Notre Dame Journal of Formal Logic 38, no. 4. (Special issue on impossible worlds.) Table of contents
- Priest, Graham. 2001. An Introduction to Non-Classical Logic. Cambridge: Cambridge University Press.
