= Extended modal realism =

Version of modal realism

Extended modal realism is a metaphysical theory developed by Takashi Yagisawa. It concerns the question of what it means that something is possible or necessary. Modal realism is the view that besides the actual world, there are many possible worlds. They exist as alternate versions of the actual world we live in. It contrasts with actualism, which holds that there is only one world: the actual world.

Extended modal realism is a special form of modal realism. It includes the controversial thesis that there are not just possible worlds but also impossible worlds. An impossible world is a world that contains a contradiction. Extended modal realism understands modality as a dimension similar to space and time. In this sense, a regular object, like a tree or a car, is not just extended in space and time but also across possible and impossible worlds: some parts of it exist in the actual world and other parts exist in non-actual worlds. There is only one universe encompassing everything that is real in the widest sense: the actual, the possible, and the impossible.

== Background ==
Modal statements, like "Hillary Clinton could have won the 2016 US election" or "it is necessary that cows are animals", are part of everyday language. According to common-sense, some modal statements are true while others are false. Modal metaphysics is interested in what determines the truth or falsehood of modal statements, i.e. in what the aspects of reality responsible for this look like. Actualists maintain that reality is actual at its most fundamental level and that possibility somehow depends on or is reducible to actuality. Modal realists, by contrast, state that possibility is an irreducible aspect of reality besides actuality. The most well-known version of modal realism is due to David Lewis, who holds that a plurality of possible worlds exist beside the actual world. Every object just belongs to one world but it has counterparts in other worlds. The truth or falsehood of modal statements depends not just on the actual world but also on these other worlds. For example, it is true that Hillary Clinton could have won the 2016 US election because there is a possible world in which a counterpart of Hillary Clinton won the 2016 US election. Extended modal realism differs from Lewis' views in that it states that objects have real parts belonging to other worlds, not just counterparts, and that there are also impossible worlds besides the possible worlds.

== Worlds as points in the modal dimension ==
A possible world is a way things could have been. According to modal realists like David Lewis, possible worlds are isolated entities. They are composed of concrete individuals that are extended in space and time. Extended modal realism, on the other hand, understands modality as a dimension similar to space and time. In this regard, a world is an index of the modal dimension similar to how a particular moment or point in time is an index in the temporal dimension. The analogy to space and time is often used to convey this different understanding of the nature of modality and how this affects the understanding of regular objects. Space is commonly pictured as made up of many regions. Spatially extended things, like chairs, trees, or ourselves, are composed of different parts that exist in different regions. Often the different parts carry different qualities: e.g. the tree is green on the top and brown on the bottom. This could be expressed by saying that the green color is located at some spatial indices occupied by the tree while the brown color is located at other spatial indices occupied by the tree. Four-dimensionalism extends these ideas to the temporal dimension. The tree as a whole can be pictured as a space-time worm: it is made up of various parts located at different spatial and temporal indices. So for example, if we move the temporal index from summer to autumn, the color occupying the top part of the tree changes from green to yellow and red as the leaves change their color. Extended modal realism applies this approach also to modality. Regular objects are extended not just in space and time but also in the modal dimension. This means that some of the parts of the tree belong to the actual world while its other parts belong to possible and impossible worlds. Another way to express these ideas is to say that space, time, and modality are relativizers of qualities like colors.

== Actuality, possibility, and impossibility ==
The modal stage of the tree in the actual world is nowhere violet but it has violet parts at other modal indices. The tree as a whole is a modally extended entity encompassing not just the actual tree but also all its modal parts belonging to other worlds. Like in Lewis's modal realism, the term "actual" just has an indexical meaning: it refers to the modal index of the speaker. "Actual" is thus analogous to the spatial term "here" and the temporal term "now".

Non-actual worlds are worlds different from our own. They include both possible and impossible worlds. Possibility can be understood in various ways: There is logical possibility, metaphysical possibility, physical possibility, etc. A world is possible if it doesn't violate the laws of the corresponding type of possibility. A world is logically possible if it obeys the laws of logic, i.e. if it does not contain a contradiction. A world is physically possible if it obeys the laws of nature. In this regard, physically possible worlds have to follow the laws of gravity, for example. Worlds that do not obey these laws are impossible worlds. There are different types of impossibility corresponding to the different types of possibility. So a world without gravity is a physically impossible world and a world containing a contradiction is a logically impossible world. The most controversial aspect of extended modal realism is that it sees impossible worlds as real in the same sense as possible worlds are real: they are modal indices. Whether a modal statement about an object is true depends on its parts belonging to non-actual worlds. For example, it is possible that the tree is violet because it has a modal stage at a possible world in which it is violet. If it is impossible that the tree is both alive and dead at the same time then it has a modal stage at an impossible world in which it is both alive and dead at the same time.

== The universe, reality and existence ==
Extended modal realism provides precise definitions of the terms universe, reality, and existence in order to distinguish them from the term world. The universe is the vast object extending in the dimensions of space, time, and modality. It is the totality of all things. The many worlds are just modal stages of the one universe. The universe encompasses everything that is real in the widest sense. There is a difference between reality and existence. Reality is a primitive notion: either something is real or it is not. Existence, on the other hand, is relative to a world. So understood in the widest sense, Pegasus is real because he exists in some possible worlds, even though he does not exist in the actual world.

== Criticism ==
Most criticisms against modal realism in general also apply to extended modal realism. For example, various theorists have used Occam's razor to argue that we should not assume that possible worlds exist since "entities should not be multiplied beyond necessity". This is often paired with the epistemological claim that there is no good evidence for their existence. But other critiques have been directed specifically at extended modal realism. As John Divers points out, the term "reality" may be useless if we allow possible as well as impossible objects into our ontology. The reason is that it seems to follow that every sentence of the form "_ is real" is true. This consequence would turn metaphysics, when understood as the science of reality, into a trivial enterprise.

Other critics have pointed out that a commitment to logically impossible worlds leads to contradictions even in possible worlds, including the actual world. This can be seen by considering a logically impossible world in which both a proposition and its negation are true. When reasoning about this impossible world, it may be possible to reach a conclusion in the actual world that both affirms and denies a proposition about this impossible world. The result would be that the actual world is also an impossible world. Yagisawa rejects this line of argument by holding that it is based on a false inference. He suggests the strict usage of a modally tensed language to avoid this problem.

== See also ==
- Modal logic
