= Modal realism =

Philosophical concept

Modal realism is the view propounded by the philosopher David Lewis that all possible worlds are real in the same way as is the actual world: they are "of a kind with this world of ours". It states that possible worlds exist, possible worlds are not different in kind from the actual world, possible worlds are irreducible entities, and the term actual in actual world is indexical, i.e. any subject can declare their world to be the actual one, much as they label the place they are "here" and the time they are "now".

Extended modal realism is a form of modal realism that involves ontological commitments not just to possible worlds but also to impossible worlds. Objects are conceived as being spread out in the modal dimension, i.e., as having not just spatial and temporal parts but also modal parts. This contrasts with Lewis' modal realism, according to which each object only inhabits one possible world.

Common arguments for modal realism refer to their theoretical usefulness for modal reasoning and to commonly accepted expressions in natural language that seem to imply ontological commitments to possible worlds. A common objection to modal realism is that it leads to an inflated ontology, which some think runs counter to Occam's razor. Critics of modal realism have also pointed out that it is counterintuitive to allow possible objects the same ontological status as actual objects. This line of thought has been further developed in the argument from morality by showing how an equal treatment of actual and non-actual persons would lead to highly implausible consequences for morality, culminating in the moral principle that every choice is equally permissible.

== "Possible world" ==
The term goes back to Leibniz's theory of possible worlds, used to analyse necessity, possibility, and similar modal notions. In short, the actual world is regarded as merely one among an infinite set of logically possible worlds, some "nearer" to the actual world and some more remote. A proposition is "necessary" if it is true in all possible worlds, and "possible" if it is true in at least one.

== Main tenets ==
At the heart of David Lewis's modal realism are several central doctrines about possible worlds:

- Possible worlds exist — they are just as real as our world.
- Possible worlds are the same sort of things as our world — they differ in content, not in kind.
- Possible worlds cannot be reduced to something more basic — they are irreducible entities in their own right.
- Actuality is indexical. When we distinguish our world from other possible worlds by claiming that it alone is actual, we mean only that it is our world.
- Possible worlds are unified by the spatiotemporal interrelations of their parts; every world is spatiotemporally isolated from every other world.
- Possible worlds are causally isolated from each other.

== Details and alternatives ==
In philosophy, possible worlds are usually regarded as real but abstract possibilities (i.e., Platonism), or sometimes as a mere metaphor, abbreviation, or as mathematical devices, or a mere combination of propositions.

Lewis himself not only claimed to take modal realism seriously (although he did regret his choice of the expression modal realism), he also insisted that his claims should be taken literally:

By what right do we call possible worlds and their inhabitants disreputable entities, unfit for philosophical services unless they can beg redemption from philosophy of language? I know of no accusation against possibles that cannot be made with equal justice against sets. Yet few philosophical consciences scruple at set theory. Sets and possibles alike make for a crowded ontology. Sets and possibles alike raise questions we have no way to answer. [...] I propose to be equally undisturbed by these equally mysterious mysteries.

How many [possible worlds] are there? In what respects do they vary, and what is common to them all? Do they obey a nontrivial law of identity of indiscernibles? Here I am at a disadvantage compared to someone who pretends as a figure of speech to believe in possible worlds, but really does not. If worlds were creatures of my imagination, I could imagine them to be any way I liked, and I could tell you all you wished to hear simply by carrying on my imaginative creation. But as I believe that there really are other worlds, I am entitled to confess that there is much about them that I do not know, and that I do not know how to find out.

== Extended modal realism ==
Extended modal realism, as developed by Takashi Yagisawa, differs from other versions of modal realism, such as David Lewis' views, in several important aspects. Possible worlds are conceived as points or indices of the modal dimension rather than as isolated space-time structures. Regular objects are extended not only in the spatial and the temporal dimensions but also in the modal dimension: some of their parts are modal parts, i.e. belong to non-actual worlds. The concept of modal parts is best explained in analogy to spatial and temporal parts. A person's hand is a spatial part of them just as their childhood is a temporal part, according to four-dimensionalism. These intuitions can be extended to the modal dimension by considering possible versions of the person which took different choices in life than they actually did. According to extended modal realism, these other selves are inhabitants of different possible worlds and are also parts of the self: modal parts.

Another difference to the Lewisian form of modal realism is that among non-actual worlds within the modal dimension are not just possible worlds but also impossible worlds. Yagisawa holds that while the notion of a world is simple, being a modal index, the notion of a possible world is composite: it is a world that is possible. Possibility can be understood in various ways: there is logical possibility, metaphysical possibility, physical possibility, etc. A world is possible if it doesn't violate the laws of the corresponding type of possibility. For example, a world is logically possible if it obeys the laws of logic or physically possible if it obeys the laws of nature. Worlds that don't obey these laws are impossible worlds. But impossible worlds and their inhabitants are just as real as possible or actual entities.

== Arguments for modal realism ==
=== Reasons given by Lewis ===
Lewis backs modal realism for a variety of reasons. First, there doesn't seem to be a reason not to. Many abstract mathematical entities are held to exist simply because they are useful. For example, sets are useful, abstract mathematical constructs that were only conceived in the 19th century. Sets are now considered to be objects in their own right, and while this is a philosophically unintuitive idea, its usefulness in understanding the workings of mathematics makes belief in it worthwhile. The same should go for possible worlds. Since these constructs have helped us make sense of key philosophical concepts in epistemology, metaphysics, philosophy of mind, etc., their existence should be accepted on pragmatic grounds.

Lewis believes that the concept of alethic modality can be reduced to talk of real possible worlds. For example, to say "x is possible" is to say that there exists a possible world where x is true. To say "x is necessary" is to say that in all possible worlds x is true. The appeal to possible worlds provides a sort of economy with the least number of undefined primitives/axioms in our ontology.

Taking this latter point one step further, Lewis argues that modality cannot be made sense of without such a reduction. He maintains that we cannot determine that x is possible without a conception of what a real world where x holds would look like. In deciding whether it is possible for basketballs to be inside of atoms we do not simply make a linguistic determination of whether the proposition is grammatically coherent, we actually think about whether a real world would be able to sustain such a state of affairs. Thus we require a brand of modal realism if we are to use modality at all.

=== Argument from ways ===
An often-cited argument is called the argument from ways. It defines possible worlds as "ways how things could have been" and relies for its premises and inferences on assumptions from natural language, for example:

(1) Hillary Clinton could have won the 2016 US election.
(2) So there are other ways how things could have been.
(3) Possible worlds are ways how things could have been.
(4) So there are other possible worlds.

The central step of this argument happens at (2) where the plausible (1) is interpreted in a way that involves quantification over "ways". Many philosophers, following Willard Van Orman Quine, hold that quantification entails ontological commitments, in this case, a commitment to the existence of possible worlds. Quine himself restricted his method to scientific theories, but others have applied it also to natural language, for example, Amie L. Thomasson in her easy approach to ontology. The strength of the argument from ways depends on these assumptions and may be challenged by casting doubt on the quantifier-method of ontology or on the reliability of natural language as a guide to ontology.

== Criticisms ==
A number of philosophers, including Lewis himself, have produced criticisms of (what some call) "extreme realism" about possible worlds. Peter Forrest argues that modal realism gives us reason to doubt the method of induction, as according to modal realism, there is a world where we are deceived by our senses and we may be in this world. James F. Ross argues that when Lewis states that counterfactual utterances are true in the sense that it is the case in another world that such a thing occurred, he "parses away our counterfactual utterances into what we do not mean". Hilary Putnam likewise writes "one doesn't have to think of a 'way' the world could have been as another world" and asks why "one couldn’t say that a 'way' the world could be is just a property, a characteristic, however complicated, that the whole world could have had, rather than another world of the same sort as our own".

=== Lewis's own critique ===
Lewis's own extended presentation of the theory (On the Plurality of Worlds, 1986) raises and then counters several lines of argument against it. That work introduces not only the theory, but its reception among philosophers. The many objections that continue to be published are typically variations on one or other of the lines that Lewis has already canvassed.

Here are some of the major categories of objection:

- Catastrophic counterintuitiveness. The theory does not accord with our deepest intuitions about reality. This is sometimes called "the incredulous stare", since it lacks argumentative content, and is merely an expression of the affront that the theory represents to "common sense" philosophical and pre-philosophical orthodoxy. Lewis is concerned to support the deliverances of common sense in general: "Common sense is a settled body of theory – unsystematic folk theory – which at any rate we do believe; and I presume that we are reasonable to believe it. (Most of it.)" (1986, p. 134). But most of it is not all of it (otherwise there would be no place for philosophy at all), and Lewis finds that reasonable argument and the weight of such considerations as theoretical efficiency compel us to accept modal realism. The alternatives, he argues at length, can themselves be shown to yield conclusions offensive to our modal intuitions.
- Inflated ontology. Some object that modal realism postulates vastly too many entities, compared with other theories. It is therefore, they argue, vulnerable to Occam's razor, according to which we should prefer, all things being equal, those theories that postulate the smallest number of entities. Lewis's reply is that all things are not equal, and in particular competing accounts of possible worlds themselves postulate more classes of entities, since there must be not only one real "concrete" world (the actual world), but many worlds of a different class altogether ("abstract" in some way or other).
- Too many worlds. This is perhaps a variant of the previous category, but it relies on appeals to mathematical propriety rather than Occamist principles. Some argue that Lewis's principles of "worldmaking" (means by which we might establish the existence of further worlds by recombination of parts of worlds we already think exist) are too permissive. So permissive are they, that the total number of worlds must exceed what is mathematically coherent. Lewis allows that there are difficulties and subtleties to address on this front (1986, pp. 89–90). Daniel Nolan ("Recombination unbound", Philosophical Studies, 1996, vol. 84, pp. 239–262) mounts a sustained argument against certain forms of the objection; but variations on it continue to appear.
- Island universes. On the version of his theory that Lewis strongly favours, each world is distinct from every other world by being spatially and temporally isolated from it. Some have objected that a world in which spatio-temporally isolated universes ("island universes") coexist is therefore not possible, by Lewis's theory (see for example Bigelow, John, and Pargetter, Robert, "Beyond the blank stare", Theoria, 1987, Vol. 53, pp. 97–114). Lewis's awareness of this difficulty discomforted him; but he could have replied that other means of distinguishing worlds may be available, or alternatively that sometimes there will inevitably be further surprising and counterintuitive consequences – beyond what we had thought we would be committed to at the start of our investigation. But this fact in itself is hardly surprising. Alvin Plantinga also wonders why we would think that possibility is grounded in some other multi-verse counterpart to me if we were to discover other universes. If not, then why think the same would apply to possible worlds as a whole?

Finally, some of these objections can be combined. For example, one can think that modal realism is unnecessary because multiverse theory can do all the modal work (e.g. many "worlds" interpretation of quantum mechanics).

A pervasive theme in Lewis's replies to the critics of modal realism is the use of tu quoque argument: your account would fail in just the same way that you claim mine would. A major heuristic virtue of Lewis's theory is that it is sufficiently definite for objections to gain some foothold; but these objections, once clearly articulated, can then be turned equally against other theories of the ontology and epistemology of possible worlds.

=== Stalnaker's response ===
Robert Stalnaker, while he finds some merit in Lewis's account of possible worlds, finds the position to be ultimately untenable. He himself advances a more "moderate" realism about possible worlds, which he terms actualism (since it holds that all that exists is in fact actual, and that there are no "merely possible" entities). In particular, Stalnaker does not accept Lewis's attempt to argue on the basis of a supposed analogy with the epistemological objection to mathematical Platonism that believing in possible worlds as Lewis imagines them is no less reasonable than believing in mathematical entities such as sets or functions.

=== Kripke's response ===
Saul Kripke described modal realism as "totally misguided", "wrong", and "objectionable". Kripke argued that possible worlds were not like distant countries out there to be discovered; rather, we stipulate what is true according to them. Kripke also criticized modal realism for its reliance on counterpart theory, which he regarded as untenable. Specifically, Kripke states that Lewis' modal realism implies that when we refer to possibilities regarding persons like you or me, we're not referring to you or me. Instead, we're referring to counterparts who are similar to us but not identical. This seems problematic because it seems like when, for example, we say that, 'Humphrey could have become President', we are talking about Humphrey (and we're not talking about a person that is like Humphrey). Lewis responds by saying this objection (i.e. The Humphrey Objection) wouldn't apply to modal realists who believe that the identity of persons can "overlap" in multiple worlds, even though Lewis thinks that view is problematic. Secondly, Lewis doesn't seem to share the intuition that there is any problem, as evidenced by the fact that he calls it an "alleged" intuition.

=== Argument from morality ===
The argument from morality, as initially formulated by Robert Merrihew Adams, criticizes modal realism on the grounds that modal realism has very implausible consequences for morality and should therefore be rejected. This can be seen by considering the principle of plenitude: the thesis that there is a possible world for every way things could be. The consequence of this principle is that the nature of the pluriverse, i.e. of reality in the widest sense, is fixed. This means that whatever choices human agents make, they have no impact on reality as a whole. For example, assume that during a stroll at a lake you spot a drowning child not far from the shore. You have a choice to save the child or not. If you choose to save the child then a counterpart of you at another possible world chooses to let it drown. If you choose to let it drown then the counterpart of you at this other possible world chooses to save it. Either way, the result for these two possible worlds is the same: one child drowns and the other is saved. The only impact of your choice is to relocate a death from the actual world to another possible world. But since, according to modal realism, there is no important difference between the actual world and other possible worlds, this shouldn't matter. The consequence would be that there is no moral obligation to save the child, which is drastically at odds with common-sense morality. Worse still, this argument can be generalized to any decision, so whatever you choose in any decision would be morally permissible.

David Lewis defends modal realism against this argument by pointing out that morality, as commonly conceived, is only interested in the actual world, specifically, that the actual agent doesn't do evil. So the argument from morality would only be problematic for an odd version of utilitarianism aiming at maximizing the "sum total of good throughout the plurality of worlds". But, as Mark Heller points out, this reply doesn't explain why we are justified in morally privileging the actual world, as modal realism seems to be precisely against such a form of unequal treatment. This is not just a problem for utilitarians but for any moral theory that is sensitive to how other people are affected by one's actions in the widest sense, causally or otherwise: "the modal realist has to consider more people in moral decision making than we ordinarily do consider". Bob Fischer, speaking on Lewis' behalf, concedes that, from a modally unrestricted point of view of morality, there is no obligation to save the child from drowning. Common-sense morality, on the other hand, assumes a modally restricted point of view. According to Fischer, this disagreement with common-sense is a cost of modal realism to be considered in an overall cost-benefit calculation, but it is no knockdown argument.

== See also ==
- Linguistic modality
- Many-worlds interpretation
- Mathematical universe hypothesis
- Modal logic
- Time Plays
- Everything Everywhere All at Once

== Bibliography ==
- David Lewis, Counterfactuals, (1973 [revised printing 1986]; Blackwell & Harvard University Press)
- David Lewis, Convention: A Philosophical Study, (1969; Harvard University Press)
- David Lewis, On the Plurality of Worlds (1986; Blackwell)
- Saul Kripke, "Naming and Necessity". Semantics of Natural Language, D. Davidson and G. Harman [eds.], [Dordrecht: D. Reidel, 1972]
- Saul Kripke, "Identity and Necessity". Identity and Individuation, Milton K. Munitz [ed.], [1974; New York, New York University Press, pp. 135–164]
- David Armstrong, A Combinatorial Theory of Possibility (1989; Cambridge University Press)
- John D. Barrow, The Constants of Nature (2002; published by Vintage in 2003)
- Colin McGinn, "Modal Reality" (Reduction, Time, and Reality, R. Healey [ed.]; Cambridge University Press)
- Stalnaker, Robert (2003). Ways a world might be: metaphysical and anti-metaphysical essays. Oxford, England: Clarendon. ISBN 0-19-925149-5.
- Andrea Sauchelli, "Concrete Possible Worlds and Counterfactual Conditionals", Synthese, 176, 3 (2010), pp. 345–356
