= On the Plurality of Worlds =

1986 book by David Lewis

- Hardcover edition
- Author: David Lewis
- Language: English
- Subject: Modal realism, possible worlds
- Genre: Non-fiction
- Publisher: Wiley-Blackwell
- Publication date: 1986
- Publication place: United States
- Media type: Print, e-book
- Pages: 288
- ISBN: 978-0631224969
- OCLC: 884892760

On the Plurality of Worlds (1986) is a book by the philosopher David Lewis that defends the thesis of modal realism. "The thesis states that the world we are part of is but one of a plurality of worlds," as he writes in the preface, "and that we who inhabit this world are only a few out of all the inhabitants of all the worlds." It is not to be confused with cosmic pluralism.

== Content ==
The book is divided into four chapters.

=== Chapter 1: A Philosopher's Paradise ===
Chapter 1 begins with an exposition of modal realism. Lewis proposes that possible worlds, including ours, are real concrete things that are isolated from each other. "There are no spatiotemporal relations at all between things that belong to different worlds," and adds, "Nor does anything that happens at one world cause anything to happen at another." He recommends a plurality of worlds because hypothesizing it is "serviceable," the familiar analysis of necessity as truth at all possible worlds being "only the beginning." Lewis shows that modal realism can be used to give coherent accounts of, among other things, modal logic and counterfactual conditionals. Modality turns into quantification ("Possibly there are blue swans if and only if, for some world W, at W there are blue swans"), and counterfactual conditionals turn into statements of fact about possible worlds ('If it were that A, then it would be that C' is true if and only if C is true at the selected A-world.) He argues that the theoretical utility of modal realism provides a reason to accept it as true, drawing a parallel to the fruitfulness of set theory in mathematics. Of both the plurality of sets and the plurality of worlds, Lewis holds that "[t]he price is right; the benefits in theoretical unity and economy are well worth the entities." Among the further benefits:

- If possible worlds help with counterfactuals, they will help with causation.
- Closeness of worlds can help spell out what it means for a false theory of nature to be close to the truth.
- Idealizations such as the ideally rational belief system are "among the theoretical benefits to be found in the paradise of possibilia."
- The content of knowledge and belief are given by epistemically and doxastically accessible worlds, respectively—that is, worlds that, for all you know/believe, are the world you live in.
- A property is the set of all its instances in all worlds where the property obtains, and similarly for relations.
- Propositions are properties instantiated only by entire possible worlds, so a proposition is a set of possible worlds, the worlds at which it holds or is true.
- Modal realism is favored over traditional systems of modality because it does not involve primitivity or brute modal facts. Modality can be reduced in the Lewisian account, but in traditional systems modal quantifiers, such as "possibly", are defined in terms of other modal quantifiers or notions. It has been argued however, that Lewis treats the existence of worlds as primitive or brute and explains modality in terms of that analysis.
- For every way a possibility might be, there is a world. Each world is a possible world, and each possible world is as real as our own.

Lewis begins his attack on "ersatzism" in this chapter, rejecting Quine's suggestion that a possible world might be taken as a mathematical representation giving the coordinates of the spacetime points that are occupied by matter. No possible world is identical with any Quinean ersatz world, but for every such ersatz world there is a genuine possible world.

=== Chapter 2: Paradox in Paradise? ===
Chapter two contains Lewis's response to several arguments, many set theoretic in nature, that attempt to show that modal realism flounders because of the quantity of worlds that must be postulated.

=== Chapter 3: Paradise on the Cheap? ===
In chapter three, Lewis considers various views that he calls "ersatz modal realism." These views are attempts to develop a theory that provides the explanatory power Lewis notes in chapter one without modal realism's ontological commitment to an infinitude of concrete possible worlds. Lewis argues that all of these attempts fail but that each fails for different reasons.

=== Chapter 4: Counterparts or Double Lives? ===
Finally, chapter 4 contains Lewis's development of counterpart theory. According to Lewis's theory, each actual object exists only in the actual world and not in any non-actual world. However, each actual object has counterparts in infinitely many possible worlds that are not identical to the actual object, but that "resemble [it] in important respects."
