= Principle of plenitude =

Philosophical principle

The principle of plenitude asserts that the universe contains all possible forms of existence.

== Definition ==
Arthur Lovejoy, a historian of ideas, was the first to trace the history of this philosophically important principle explicitly. Lovejoy distinguishes two versions of the principle: a static version, in which the universe displays a constant fullness and diversity, and a temporalized version, in which fullness and diversity gradually increase over time.

== In Plato ==
Lovejoy traces the principle of plenitude to the writings of Plato, finding in the Timaeus an insistence on "the necessarily complete translation of all the ideal possibilities into actuality". By contrast, he takes Aristotle to reject the principle in his Metaphysics, when he writes that "it is not necessary that everything that is possible should exist in actuality".

Since Plato, the principle of plenitude has had many adherents.

== In subsequent Greek philosophy ==
Epicurus reiterated the principle in fr.266 Us. His follower Lucretius (DRN V 526-33) famously applied the principle to the sets of multiple explanations by which the Epicureans account for astronomical and meteorological phenomena: every possible explanation is also true, if not in our world, then elsewhere in the infinite universe.

== In Christian theology ==
Augustine of Hippo brought the principle from Neo-Platonic thought into early Christian Theology. St Anselm's ontological arguments for God's existence used the principle's implication that nature will become as complete as it possibly can be, to argue that existence is a "perfection" in the sense of a completeness or fullness. Thomas Aquinas accepted a modified form of the principle, but qualified it by making several distinctions that safeguard the freedom of God.

== Early modern philosophy ==
Giordano Bruno's insistence on an infinity of worlds was not based on the theories of Copernicus, or on observation, but on the principle applied to God. His death may then be attributed to his conviction of its truth, as he refused to recant even while facing capital punishment for his view about this and other matters, which caused him to be convicted of heresy. Spinoza, according to Lovejoy, "expressed the principle of plenitude in its most uncompromising form" and "represented it as necessary in the strict logical sense". Kant believed in the principle but not in the possibility of its empirical verification. Leibniz believed that the best of all possible worlds would actualize every genuine possibility.

== See also ==
- Great chain of being
- Meinong's jungle
- Modal realism
- Murphy's law
- Pleroma
- Multiverse

== See also ==
- The Discarded Image – mentions the principle in chapters III, IV, and VI
