= Actualism =

Philosophical view that everything there is is actual

In analytic philosophy, actualism is the view that everything that is (i.e., everything that has being, in the broadest sense) is actual. Another phrasing of the thesis is that the domain of unrestricted quantification ranges over all and only actual existents.

The denial of actualism is possibilism, the thesis that there are some entities that are merely possible: these entities have being but are not actual and, hence, enjoy a "less robust" sort of being than do actually existing things. An important, but significantly different notion of possibilism known as modal realism was developed by the philosopher David Lewis. On Lewis's account, the actual world is identified with the physical universe of which we are all a part. Other possible worlds exist in exactly the same sense as the actual world; they are simply spatio-temporally unrelated to our world, and to each other. Hence, for Lewis, "merely possible" entities—entities that exist in other possible worlds—exist in exactly the same sense as do we in the actual world; to be actual, from the perspective of any given individual x in any possible world, is simply to be part of the same world as x.

Actualists face the problem of explaining why many expressions commonly used in natural language are meaningful and sometimes even true despite the fact that they contain references to non-actual entities. Problematic expressions include names of fictional characters, definite descriptions and intentional attitude reports. Actualists have often responded to this problem by paraphrasing the expressions with apparently problematic ontological commitments into ones that are free of such commitments. Actualism has been challenged by truthmaker theory to explain how truths about what is possible or necessary depend on actuality, i.e. to point out which actual entities can act as truthmakers for them. Popular candidates for this role within an actualist ontology include possible worlds conceived as abstract objects, essences and dispositions.

Actualism and possibilism in ethics are two different theories about how future choices affect what the agent should presently do. Actualists assert that it is only relevant what the agent would actually do later for assessing the normative status of an alternative. Possibilists, on the other hand, hold that we should also take into account what the agent could do, even if he wouldn't do it.

== Example ==
Consider the statement "Sherlock Holmes exists." This is a false statement about the world, but is usually accepted as representing a possible truth. This contingency is usually described by the statement "there is a possible world in which Sherlock Holmes exists". The possibilist argues that apparent existential claims such as this (that "there are" possible worlds of various sorts) ought to be taken more or less at face value: as stating the existence of two or more worlds, only one of which (at the most) can be the actual one. Hence, they argue, there are innumerably many possible worlds other than our own, which exist just as much as ours does.

Most actualists will be happy to grant the interpretation of "Sherlock Holmes' existence is possible" in terms of possible worlds. But they argue that the possibilist goes wrong in taking this as a sign that there exist other worlds that are just like ours, except for the fact that we are not actually in them. The actualist argues, instead, that when we claim "possible worlds" exist we are making claims that things exist in our own actual world which can serve as possible worlds for the interpretation of modal claims: that many ways the world could be (actually) exist, but not that any worlds which are those ways exist other than the actual world around us.

== Viewpoints ==
From an actualist point of view, such as Robert Merrihew Adams', possible worlds are nothing more than fictions created within the actual world. Possible worlds are mere descriptions of ways this world (the actual one) might have been, and nothing else. Thus, as modal constructions, they come in as a handy heuristic device to use with modal logic; as it helps our modal reasoning to imagine ways the world might have been. Thus, the actualist interpretation of "◊p" sees the modality (i.e., "the way" in which it is true) as being de dicto and not entailing any ontological commitment.

So, from this point of view, what distinguishes the actual world from other possible worlds is what distinguishes reality from a description of a simulation of reality, this world from Sherlock Holmes': the former exists and is not a product of imagination and the latter does not exist and is a product of the imagination set in a modal construction.

From a modal realist's point of view, such as Lewis', the proposition "◊p" means that p obtains in at least one other, distinct world that is as real as the one we are in. If a state of affairs is possible, then it really obtains, it physically occurs in at least one world. Therefore, as Lewis is happy to admit, there is a world where someone named Sherlock Holmes lived at 221b Baker Street in Victorian times, there is another world where pigs fly, and there is even another world where both Sherlock Holmes exists and pigs fly.

This leaves open the question, of course, of what an actually existing "way the world could be" is; and on this question actualists are divided. One of the most popular solutions is to claim, as William Lycan and Adams do, that "possible worlds" talk can be reduced to logical relations amongst consistent and maximally complete sets of propositions. "Consistent" here means that none of its propositions contradict one another (if they did, it would not be a possible description of the world); "maximally complete" means that the set covers every feature of the world. (More precisely: a set of propositions is "maximally complete" if, for any meaningful proposition P, P is either an element of the set, or the negation of an element of the set, or entailed by the conjunction of one or more elements of the set, or the negation of a proposition entailed by the conjunction of one or more elements of the set). Here the "possible world" which is said to be actual is actual in virtue of all its elements being true of the world around us.

Another common actualist account, advanced in different forms by Alvin Plantinga and David Armstrong, views "possible worlds" not as descriptions of how the world might be (through a very large set of statements) but rather as a maximally complete state of affairs that covers every state of affairs which might obtain or not obtain. Here, the "possible world" which is said to be actual is actual in virtue of that state of affairs obtaining in the world around us (since it is maximally complete, only one such state of affairs could actually obtain; all the others would differ from the actual world in various large or small ways).

== Language and non-actual objects ==
Actualism, the view that being is restricted to actual being, is usually contrasted with possibilism, the view that being also includes possible entities, so-called possibilia. But there is a third and even wider-ranging view, Meinongianism, which holds that being includes impossible entities. So actualists disagree with both possibilists and Meinongians whether there are possible objects, e.g. unicorns, while actualists and possibilists disagree with Meinongians whether there are impossible objects, e.g. round squares.

The disagreements between these three views touch many areas in philosophy, including the semantics of natural language and the problem of intentionality. This is due to the fact that various expressions commonly used in natural language seem to refer to merely possible and in some cases even impossible objects. Since actualists deny the existence of such objects, it would seem that they are committed to the view that these expressions don't refer to anything and are therefore meaningless. This would be a rather unintuitive consequence of actualism, which is why actualists have proposed different strategies for different types of expressions in order to avoid this conclusion. These strategies usually involve some kind of paraphrase that transforms a sentence with apparently problematic ontological commitments into one that is free of such commitments.

=== Names and definite descriptions ===
Names of non-existent entities, like the 'planet' Vulcan, or names of fictional characters, like Sherlock Holmes, are one type of problematic expressions. These expressions are usually considered meaningful despite the fact that neither Vulcan nor Sherlock Holmes have actual existence. Similar cases come from definite descriptions that fail to refer, like "the present king of France". Possibilists and Meinongians have no problem to account for the meaning of these expressions: they just refer to possible objects. (Possibilists share this problem with the actualists in case of definite descriptions involving impossibility like "the round square") A widely known solution to these problems comes from Bertrand Russell. He proposed to analyze both names and definite descriptions in terms of quantified expressions. For example, the expression "The present king of France is bald" could be paraphrased as "there is exactly one thing that is currently king of France, and all such things are bald". This sentence is false, but it doesn't contain a reference to any non-actual entities anymore, thanks to the paraphrase. So the actualist has solved the problem of accounting for its meaning.

=== Intentional attitude reports ===
Intentional attitude reports about non-actual entities are another type of problematic cases, for example "Peter likes Superman". Possibilists can interpret the intentional attitude, in this case the liking, as a relation between Peter, an actual person, and Superman, a possible person. One actualist solution to this problem involves treating intentional attitudes not as relations between a subject and an object but as properties of the subject. This approach has been termed "adverbialism" since the object of the intentional attitude is seen as a modification of the attitude: "Peter likes superman-ly". This paraphrase succeeds in removing any reference to non-actual entities.

== Truthmaker theory and modal truths ==
Truthmaker theorists hold that truth depends on reality. In the terms of truthmaker theory: a truthbearer (e.g. a proposition) is true because of the existence of its truthmaker (e.g. a fact). Positing a truth without being able to account for its truthmaker violates this principle and has been labeled "ontological cheating". Actualists face the problem of how to account for the truthmakers of modal truths, like "it was possible for the Cuban Missile Crisis to escalate into a full-scale nuclear war", "there could have been purple cows" or "it is necessary that all cows are animals". Actualists have proposed various solutions, but there is no consensus as to which one is the best solution.

=== Possible worlds ===
A well-known account relies on the notion of possible worlds, conceived as actual abstract objects, for example as maximal consistent sets of propositions or of states of affairs. A set of propositions is maximal if, for any statement p, either p or not-p is a member. Possible worlds act as truthmakers for modal truths. For example, there is a possible world which is inhabited by purple cows. This world is a truthmaker for "there could have been purple cows". Cows are animals in all possible worlds that are inhabited by cows. So all worlds are the truthmaker of "it is necessary that all cows are animals". This account relies heavily on a logical notion of modality, since possibility and necessity are defined in terms of consistency. This dependency has prompted some philosophers to assert that no truthmakers at all are needed for modal truths, that modal truths are true "by default". This position involves abandoning truthmaker maximalism.

=== Essences ===
An alternative solution to the problem of truthmakers for modal truths is based on the notion of essence. Objects have their properties either essentially or accidentally. The essence of an object involves all the properties it has essentially; it defines the object's nature: what it fundamentally is. On this type of account, the truthmaker for "it is necessary that all cows are animals" is that it belongs to the essence of cows to be animals. The truthmaker for "there could have been purple cows" is that color is not essential to cows. Some essentialist theories focus on object essences, i.e. that certain properties are essential to a specific object. Other essentialist theories focus on kind essences, i.e. that certain properties are essential to the kind or species of the object in question.

=== Dispositions ===
Another account attempts to ground modal truths in the dispositions or powers of actually existing entities. So, for example, the claim that "it's possible that the teacup breaks" has its truthmaker in the teacup's disposition to break, i.e. in its fragility. While this type of theory can account for various truths, it has been questioned whether it can account for all truths. Problematic cases include truths like "it's possible that nothing existed" or "it's possible that the laws of nature had been different". A theistic version of this account has been proposed in order to solve these problems: God's power is the truthmaker for modal truths. "There could have been purple cows" because it was in God's power to create purple cows, while "it is necessary that all cows are animals" because it was not in God's power to create cows that are not animals.

=== Softcore vs hardcore ===
These solutions proposed on behalf of actualism can be divided into two categories: Softcore actualism and hardcore actualism. The adherents of these positions disagree on which part of the actual world is the foundation supporting modal truths. Softcore actualists hold that modal truths are grounded in the abstract realm, for example in possible worlds conceived as abstract objects existing in the actual world. Hardcore actualists, on the other hand, assert that modal truths are grounded in the concrete constituents of the actual world, for example in essences or in dispositions.

== Indexical actuality analysis ==
According to the indexical conception of actuality, favoured by Lewis (1986), actuality is an attribute which our world has relative to itself, but which all the other worlds have relative to themselves too. Actuality is an intrinsic property of each world, so world w is actual just at world w. "Actual" is seen as an indexical term, and its reference depends on its context. Therefore, there is no feature of this world (nor of any other) to be distinguished in order to infer that the world is actual, "the actual world" is actual simply in virtue of the definition of "actual": a world is actual simpliciter.

== Ethics ==
Actualism and possibilism in ethics are, in contrast to the main part of this article, not concerned with metaphysical claims. Instead, their goal, as ethical theories, is to determine what one ought to do. They are mostly, but not exclusively, relevant for consequentialism, the theory that an action is right if and only if its consequences are better than the consequences of any alternative action. These consequences may include other actions of the agent at a later point in time. Actualists assert that it is only relevant what the agent would actually do later for assessing the value of an alternative. Possibilists, on the other hand, hold that we should also take into account what the agent could do, even if she wouldn't do it.

For example, assume that Gifre has the choice between two alternatives, eating a cookie or not eating anything. Having eaten the first cookie, Gifre could stop eating cookies, which is the best alternative. But after having tasted one cookie, Gifre would freely decide to continue eating cookies until the whole bag is finished, which would result in a terrible stomach ache and would be the worst alternative. Not eating any cookies at all, on the other hand, would be the second-best alternative. Now the question is: should Gifre eat the first cookie or not? Actualists are only concerned with the actual consequences. According to them, Gifre should not eat any cookies at all since it is better than the alternative leading to a stomach ache. Possibilists contend that the best possible course of action involves eating the first cookie and this is therefore what Gifre should do.

One counterintuitive consequence of actualism is that agents can avoid moral obligations simply by having an imperfect moral character. For example, a lazy person might justify rejecting a request to help a friend by arguing that, due to her lazy character, she wouldn't have done the work anyway, even if she had accepted the request. By rejecting the offer right away, she managed at least not to waste anyone's time. Actualists might even consider her behavior praiseworthy since she did what, according to actualism, she ought to have done. This seems to be a very easy way to "get off the hook" that is avoided by possibilism. But possibilism has to face the objection that in some cases it sanctions and even recommends what actually leads to the worst outcome.

Douglas W. Portmore has suggested that these and other problems of actualism and possibilism can be avoided by constraining what counts as a genuine alternative for the agent. On his view, it is a requirement that the agent has rational control over the event in question. For example, eating only one cookie and stopping afterward only is an option for Gifre if she has the rational capacity to repress her temptation to continue eating. If the temptation is irrepressible then this course of action is not considered to be an option and is therefore not relevant when assessing what the best alternative is. Portmore suggests that, given this adjustment, we should prefer a view very closely associated with possibilism called maximalism.

== See also ==
- Centered worlds
- Many-worlds interpretation
- Ultrafinitism
