= Multiple occupancy view =

In metaphysics, the multiple occupancy view (m.o.) is a particular analysis of fission cases, which claims to be at least a priori possible, if not actually true of real cases of fission.

== Description ==
Imagine an amoeba which undergoes symmetrical fission into two sister amoebae (call them B and C). We tend to think that before fission there was one amoeba (call it A), but what has happened to it? It has not died, for death is a biological state, and there are no dead amoebae lying around after the fission! In fact, there is more life after the fission than there was before, i.e. two live amoebae instead of just one. Has A somehow ceased to exist without dying? Is A still around, and identical with either B or C? It cannot be identified with both B and C, for identity is a transitive relation, and B is certainly not the same amoeba as C. Yet, the fission was symmetrical, so neither B nor C has any more or less claim to be A than the other.

This is the problem. We seem to be forced to say that A has ceased to exist, but the m.o. view provides us with another option, consistent with all of the above considerations. The m.o. view is that there were two distinct but coincident amoebae before fission, occupying the same body of matter, but which diverge upon fission into the same two distinct, but no longer coincident, amoebae. The number of amoebae hasn't increased, i.e. there were two before fission, and there are the same two after fission. The amoeba has "divided without multiplying"!

The m.o. view has also been applied to hypothetical cases of symmetrical fission involving persons. On the face of it, the m.o. view contravenes the principle of identity of indiscernibles. However, one and the same physical object can be a proper part of two or more distinct objects (e.g., a road intersection is part of two distinct roads), which leads to four-dimensionalism, whereby, for example, an amoeba at a time (amoeba stage) is a temporal part of an amoeba extended in time, i.e., objects have temporal parts.
