= Ars Disputandi =

- Discipline: Philosophy of religion
- Language: English
- Edited by: Marcel Sarot, Michael Scott, Maarten Wisse, Niek Brunsveld

Publication details
- History: 2001–2012
- Publisher: Igitur Publishing (Utrecht University) (The Netherlands)
- Frequency: Upon acceptance
- Open access: Yes
- License: CC BY

Standard abbreviations
- ISO 4: Ars Disput.

Indexing
- ISSN: 1566-5399 (print); 1566-5399 (web)
- OCLC no.: 52587239

Links
- Online archive

Ars Disputandi (Latin: the art of debate) was an online peer-reviewed academic journal of the philosophy of religion that was established in 2001 and published by Utrecht University's Igitur Publishing. It is abstracted and indexed in the ATLA Religion Database. In 2013 it was incorporated into the International Journal of Philosophy and Theology, which was previously known as Bijdragen: International Journal for Philosophy and Theology.

== See also ==
- List of theological journals
