= Possible world =

Concept of philosophy and logic used to express modal claims

A possible world is a complete and consistent way the world is or could have been. Possible worlds are widely used as a formal device in logic, philosophy, and linguistics in order to provide a semantics for intensional and modal logic. Their metaphysical status has been a subject of controversy in philosophy, with modal realists such as David Lewis arguing that there are literally existing alternate realities, and others such as Robert Stalnaker arguing that alternate realities do not exist.

== Logic ==
Possible worlds are one of the foundational concepts in modal and intensional logics. Formulas in these logics are used to represent statements about what might be true, what should be true, what one believes to be true and so forth. To give these statements a formal interpretation, logicians use structures containing possible worlds. For instance, in the relational semantics for classical propositional modal logic, the formula $\Diamond P$ (read as "possibly P") is actually true if and only if $P$ is true in some world which is accessible from the actual world.

Possible worlds play a central role in the work of both linguists and/or philosophers working in formal semantics. Contemporary formal semantics is couched in formal systems rooted in Montague grammar, which is itself built on Richard Montague's intensional logic. Contemporary research in semantics typically uses possible worlds as formal tools without committing to a particular theory of their metaphysical status. The term possible world is retained even by those who attach no metaphysical significance to them.

In the field of database theory, possible worlds are also a notion used in the setting of uncertain databases and probabilistic databases, which serve as a succinct representation of a large number of possible worlds.

== Argument from ways ==
Possible worlds are often regarded with suspicion, which is why their proponents have struggled to find arguments in their favor. An often-cited argument is called the argument from ways. It defines possible worlds as "ways things could have been" and relies for its premises and inferences on assumptions from natural language, for example:

1. The Black Death could have killed 99% of the European population, rather than the estimated 25 to 60%.
2. So there are other ways things could have been.
3. Possible worlds are ways things could have been.
4. So there are other possible worlds.

The central step of this argument happens at (2) where the plausible (1) is interpreted in a way that involves quantification over "ways". Many philosophers, following Willard Van Orman Quine, hold that quantification entails ontological commitments, in this case, a commitment to the existence of possible worlds. Quine himself restricted his method to scientific theories, but others have applied it also to natural language, for example, Amie L. Thomasson in her paper entitled Ontology Made Easy. The strength of the argument from ways depends on these assumptions and may be challenged by casting doubt on the quantifier-method of ontology or on the reliability of natural language as a guide to ontology.

== Philosophical issues and applications ==
=== Metaphysics ===
The ontological status of possible worlds has provoked intense debate. David Lewis famously advocated for a position known as modal realism, which holds that possible worlds are real, concrete places which exist in the exact same sense that the actual world exists. On Lewis's account, the actual world is special only in that we live there. This doctrine is called the indexicality of actuality since it can be understood as claiming that the term "actual" is an indexical, like "now" and "here". Lewis gave a variety of arguments for this position. He argued that just as the reality of atoms is demonstrated by their explanatory power in physics, so too are possible worlds justified by their explanatory power in philosophy. He also argued that possible worlds must be real because they are simply "ways things could have been" and nobody doubts that such things exist. Finally, he argued that they could not be reduced to more "ontologically respectable" entities such as maximally consistent sets of propositions without rendering theories of modality circular. (He referred to these theories as "ersatz modal realism" which try to get the benefits of possible worlds semantics "on the cheap").

Modal realism is controversial. Quine rejected it as "metaphysically extravagant". Stalnaker responded to Lewis's arguments by pointing out that a way things could have been is not itself a world, but rather a property that such a world can have. Since properties can exist without them applying to any existing objects, there's no reason to conclude that other worlds like ours exist. Another of Stalnaker's arguments attacks Lewis's indexicality theory of actuality. Stalnaker argues that even if the English word "actual" is an indexical, that doesn't mean that other worlds exist. For comparison, one can use the indexical "I" without believing that other people actually exist. Some philosophers instead endorse the view of possible worlds as maximally consistent sets of propositions or descriptions, while others such as Saul Kripke treat them as purely formal (i.e. mathematical) devices.

=== Explicating necessity and possibility ===
At least since Aristotle, philosophers have been greatly concerned with the logical statuses of propositions, e.g. necessity, contingency, and impossibility. In the twentieth century, possible worlds have been used to explicate these notions. In modal logic, a proposition is understood in terms of the worlds in which it is true and worlds in which it is false. Thus, equivalences like the following have been proposed:

- True propositions are those that are true in the actual world (for example: "Archduke Franz Ferdinand was assassinated in 1914").
- False propositions are those that are false in the actual world (for example: "Archduke Franz Ferdinand was assassinated in 2014").
- Possible propositions are those that are true in at least one possible world (for example: "Archduke Franz Ferdinand survived the assassination attempt against him in 1914"). This includes propositions which are necessarily true, in the sense below.
- Impossible propositions (or necessarily false propositions) are those that are true in no possible world (for example: "Melissa and Toby are taller than each other at the same time").
- Necessarily true propositions (often simply called necessary propositions) are those that are true in all possible worlds (for example: "2 + 2 = 4"; "all bachelors are unmarried").
- Contingent propositions are those that are true in some possible worlds and false in others (for example: "Archduke Franz Ferdinand was assassinated in 1914" is contingently true and "Archduke Franz Ferdinand survived the assassination attempt against him in 1914" is contingently false).

=== Other uses ===
Possible worlds play a central role in many other debates in philosophy. These include debates about the Zombie Argument, physicalism, and supervenience in the philosophy of mind. Many debates in the philosophy of religion have been impacted by the use of possible worlds, such as debates about the ontological argument, the problem of evil, and God's foreknowledge.

== History of the concept ==
The idea of possible worlds is most commonly attributed to Gottfried Leibniz, who spoke of possible worlds as ideas in the mind of God and used the notion to argue that our actually created world must be "the best of all possible worlds". Arthur Schopenhauer argued that on the contrary our world must be the worst of all possible worlds, because if it were only a little worse it could not continue to exist.

Scholars have found implicit earlier traces of the idea of possible worlds in the works of René Descartes, a major influence on Leibniz, Al-Ghazali (The Incoherence of the Philosophers), Averroes (The Incoherence of the Incoherence), Fakhr al-Din al-Razi (Matalib al-'Aliya), John Duns Scotus and Antonio Rubio (Commentarii in libros Aristotelis Stagiritae de Coelo).

The contemporary philosophical use of the notion was pioneered by David Lewis and Saul Kripke.

== See also ==
- Alternate history
- Extended modal realism – Version of modal realism
- Fictionalism – Pretending to treat something as literally true (a "useful fiction")
- Impossible world – Term used to model separate circumstances that cannot exist together
- Modal fictionalism – Philosophical concept
- Molinism – Theological position on God's knowledge
- Multiverse – Hypothetical group of multiple universes
- Other worlds strategy – Philosophical treatment of oxymorons
- Standard translation, an embedding of modal logics into first-order logic which captures their possible world semantics
