= David Lewis (philosopher) =

American philosopher (1941–2001)

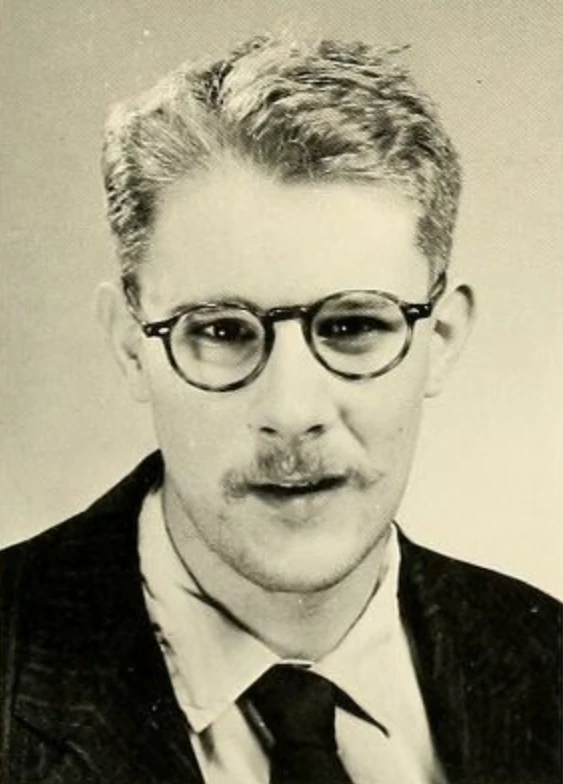
- Lewis in 1962
- Born: David Kellogg Lewis; September 28, 1941; Oberlin, Ohio, U.S.
- Died: October 14, 2001 (aged 60); Princeton, New Jersey, U.S.
- Other name: "Bruce Le Catt"
- Spouse: Stephanie R. Lewis

Education
- Education: Swarthmore College (BA); St Anne's College, Oxford; Harvard University (PhD)
- Doctoral advisor: Willard Van Orman Quine
- Other advisors: Iris Murdoch, Donald Cary Williams

Philosophical work
- Era: 20th-century philosophy
- Region: Western philosophy
- School: Analytic; Nominalism; Perdurantism
- Institutions: UCLA; Princeton University
- Doctoral students: Robert Brandom, Alex Byrne, L. A. Paul, Peter Railton, J. David Velleman
- Notable students: Ned Hall
- Main interests: Logic · Philosophy of language · Metaphysics; Epistemology · Ethics
- Notable ideas: Possible worlds Modal realism Counterfactuals; Counterpart theory Principal principle Humean supervenience Laws of nature as the theorems of the deductive system best combining simplicity and strength Lewis signaling game Lewis's triviality result Conversational scoreboard Functional specification theory The endurantism–perdurantism distinction Descriptive-causal theory of reference De se Qualitative vs quantitative parsimony Ramsey–Lewis method Gunk; Ontological innocence Centered world

David Kellogg Lewis (September 28, 1941 – October 14, 2001) was an American philosopher. Lewis taught briefly at UCLA and then at Princeton University from 1970 until his death. He is closely associated with Australia, whose philosophical community he visited almost annually for more than 30 years.

Lewis made significant contributions in the philosophy of mind, philosophy of probability, epistemology, philosophical logic, aesthetics, philosophy of mathematics, philosophy of time, and philosophy of science. In most of these fields he is considered among the most important figures of recent decades. Lewis is most famous for his work in metaphysics, philosophy of language and semantics, in which his books On the Plurality of Worlds (1986) and Counterfactuals (1973) are considered classics.

His works on the logic and semantics of counterfactual conditionals are broadly used by philosophers and linguists along with a competing account from Robert Stalnaker; together the Stalnaker–Lewis theory of counterfactuals has become perhaps the most pervasive and influential account of its type in the philosophical and linguistic literature. His metaphysics incorporated seminal contributions to quantified modal logic, the development of counterpart theory, counterfactual causation, and the position called "Humean supervenience". Most comprehensively in On the Plurality of Worlds, Lewis defended modal realism: the view that possible worlds exist as concrete entities, and that our world is one among many equally real possible ones.

== Early life and education ==
Lewis was born in Oberlin, Ohio, to John D. Lewis, a professor of government at Oberlin College, and Ruth Ewart Kellogg Lewis, a medieval historian. He was the grandson of the Presbyterian minister Edwin Henry Kellogg and the great-grandson of the Presbyterian missionary and Hindi expert Samuel H. Kellogg.

Lewis attended Oberlin High School, where he attended college classes in mathematics and chemistry. He went on to Swarthmore College and spent a year at Oxford University (1959–60), where he was tutored by Iris Murdoch and attended lectures by Gilbert Ryle, H. P. Grice, P. F. Strawson, and J. L. Austin. His year at Oxford played an important role in his decision to study philosophy. While undertaking graduate studies at Harvard University, Lewis failed a preliminary exam on metaphysics twice, risking expulsion if he could not pass it on the third attempt. His wife, Steffi Lewis, said he would get stuck on any question he found interesting and neglect the rest. Lewis received his Ph.D. from Harvard University in 1967, where he studied under W. V. O. Quine, whose views he would later dispute. It was there he took a seminar with the visiting Australian philosopher J. J. C. Smart. Smart recalled, "I taught David Lewis, or rather, he taught me."

Lewis joined the philosophy department at the University of California, Los Angeles, in 1966. In 1970, he moved to Princeton University, where he spent the remainder of his career.

== Early work on convention ==
Lewis's first monograph was Convention: A Philosophical Study (1969), which is based on his doctoral dissertation and uses concepts of game theory to analyze the nature of social conventions. It won the American Philosophical Association's first Franklin Matchette Prize for the best book published in philosophy by a philosopher under 40. Lewis claimed that social conventions, such as the convention in most states that one drives on the right (not on the left), the convention that the original caller will re-call if a phone conversation is interrupted, etc., are solutions to so-called "'co-ordination problems'". Co-ordination problems were at the time of Lewis's book an under-discussed kind of game-theoretical problem; most game-theoretical discussion had centered on problems where the participants are in conflict, such as the prisoner's dilemma.

Co-ordination problems are problematic, for, though the participants have common interests, there are several solutions. Sometimes one of the solutions is "salient", a concept invented by the game-theorist and economist Thomas Schelling (by whom Lewis was much inspired). For example, a co-ordination problem that has the form of a meeting may have a salient solution if there is only one possible spot to meet in town. But in most cases, we must rely on what Lewis calls "precedent" for a salient solution. If both participants know that a particular co-ordination problem, say "which side should we drive on?", has been solved in the same way numerous times before, both know that both know this, both know that both know that both know this, etc. (this particular state Lewis calls common knowledge, and it has since been a frequent topic of discussion among philosophers and game theorists), then they will easily solve the problem. That they have solved the problem successfully will be seen by even more people, and thus the convention will spread in the society. A convention is thus a behavioral regularity that sustains itself because it serves the interests of everyone involved. Another important feature of a convention is that a convention could be entirely different: one could just as well drive on the left; it is more or less arbitrary that one drives on the right in the US, for example.

Lewis's main goal in the book, however, was not simply to provide an account of convention but rather to investigate the "platitude that language is ruled by convention" (Convention, p. 1.) The book's last two chapters (Signalling Systems and Conventions of Language; cf. also "Languages and Language", 1975) make the case that a population's use of a language consists of conventions of truthfulness and trust among its members. Lewis recasts in this framework notions such as truth and analyticity, claiming that they are better understood as relations between sentences and a language rather than as properties of sentences.

== Counterfactuals and modal realism ==
David Lewis's conditional logics of counterfactuals

Lewis went on to publish Counterfactuals (1973), which gives a modal analysis of the truth conditions of counterfactual conditionals in possible world semantics and the governing logic for such statements. According to Lewis, the counterfactual "If kangaroos had no tails they would topple over" is true if in all worlds most similar to the actual world where the antecedent "if kangaroos had no tails" is true, the consequent that kangaroos in fact topple over is also true. Lewis introduced the now standard "would" conditional operator ◻→ to capture these conditionals' logic. A sentence of the form A ◻→ C is true on Lewis's account for the same reasons given above. If there is a world maximally similar to ours where kangaroos lack tails but do not topple over, the counterfactual is false. The notion of similarity plays a crucial role in the analysis of the conditional. Intuitively, given the importance in our world of tails to kangaroos remaining upright, in the most similar worlds to ours where they have no tails they presumably topple over more frequently and so the counterfactual comes out true.

This treatment of counterfactuals is closely related to an independently discovered account of conditionals by Robert Stalnaker, and so this kind of analysis is called Stalnaker–Lewis theory. The crucial areas of dispute between Stalnaker's account and Lewis's are whether these conditionals quantify over constant or variable domains (strict analysis vs. variable-domain analysis) and whether the Limit assumption should be included in the accompanying logic. Linguist Angelika Kratzer has developed a competing theory for counterfactual or subjunctive conditionals, "premise semantics", which aims to give a better heuristic for determining the truth of such statements in light of their often vague and context-sensitive meanings. Kratzer's premise semantics does not diverge from Lewis's for counterfactuals but aims to spread the analysis between context and similarity to give more accurate and concrete predictions for counterfactual truth conditions.

=== Realism about possible worlds ===
What made Lewis's views about counterfactuals controversial is that whereas Stalnaker treated possible worlds as imaginary entities, "made up" for the sake of theoretical convenience, Lewis adopted a position his formal account of counterfactuals did not commit him to, namely modal realism. On Lewis's formulation, when we speak of a world where I made the shot that in this world I missed, we are speaking of a world just as real as this one, and although we say that in that world I made the shot, more precisely it is not I but a counterpart of mine who was successful.

Lewis had already proposed this view in some of his earlier papers: "Counterpart Theory and Quantified Modal Logic" (1968), "Anselm and Actuality" (1970), and "Counterparts of Persons and their Bodies" (1971). The theory was widely considered implausible, but Lewis urged that it be taken seriously. Most often the idea that there exist infinitely many causally isolated universes, each as real as our own but different from it in some way, and that alluding to objects in this universe as necessary to explain what makes certain counterfactual statements true but not others, meets with what Lewis calls the "incredulous stare" (Lewis, On the Plurality of Worlds, 2005, pp. 135–137). He defends and elaborates his theory of extreme modal realism, while insisting that there is nothing extreme about it, in On the Plurality of Worlds (1986). Lewis acknowledges that his theory is contrary to common sense, but believes its advantages far outweigh this disadvantage, and that therefore we should not be hesitant to pay this price.

According to Lewis, "actual" is merely an indexical label we give a world when we are in it. Things are necessarily true when they are true in all possible worlds. (Lewis is not the first to speak of possible worlds in this context. Gottfried Wilhelm Leibniz and C.I. Lewis, for example, both speak of possible worlds as a way of thinking about possibility and necessity, and some of David Kaplan's early work is on the counterpart theory. Lewis's original suggestion was that all possible worlds are equally concrete, and the world in which we find ourselves is no realer than any other possible world.)

=== Criticisms ===
This theory has faced a number of criticisms. In particular, it is not clear how we could know what goes on in other worlds. After all, they are causally disconnected from ours; we cannot look into them to see what is going on there. A related objection is that, while people are concerned with what they could have done, they are not concerned with what people in other worlds, no matter how similar to them, do. As Saul Kripke once put it, a presidential candidate could not care less whether someone else, in another world, wins an election, but does care whether he himself could have won it.

Another criticism of the realist approach to possible worlds is that it has an inflated ontology—by extending the property of concreteness to more than the singular actual world it multiplies theoretical entities beyond what should be necessary to its explanatory aims, thereby violating the principle of parsimony, Occam's razor. But the opposite position could be taken on the view that the modal realist reduces the categories of possible worlds by eliminating the special case of the actual world as the exception to possible worlds as simple abstractions. Possible worlds are employed in the work of Kripke and many others, but not in the concrete sense Lewis propounded. While none of these alternative approaches has found anything near universal acceptance, very few philosophers accept Lewis's brand of modal realism.

Alan Hájek has argued that the similarity analysis of counterfactuals fails because there will not always be a possible world that is most similar. Lewis preempts this by claiming that a counterfactual is true if any antecedent world where the consequent is true is more similar to the actual world than the most similar antecedent world where the consequent is false. This allows him to accommodate infinitely similar worlds, unlike Robert Stalnaker. Consider the counterfactual 'if this line were bigger, it would not be 1 cm bigger'. The line can be bigger by an infinitely larger or smaller amount, so there are infinite worlds, but there are infinitely many true consequent worlds that are more similar to our world than the most similar false antecedent world. Hájek objects that in some cases, infinite truth and falsity worlds can mirror each other, meaning that neither is more similar. Consider 'If these lines were not 10 cm, it would be bigger'. For any length greater than 10 cm, there is a corresponding length under 10 cm to infinity; hence, the similarity relation fails because no world where the consequent is true or false is more similar than the other.

=== Influence ===
At Princeton, Lewis was a mentor of young philosophers and trained dozens of successful figures in the field, including several current Princeton faculty members, as well as people now teaching at a number of the leading philosophy departments in the U.S. Among his prominent students were Robert Brandom, L. A. Paul, J. David Velleman, Peter Railton, Phillip Bricker, Cian Dorr, Johnathan Schaffer, Daniel Stoljar, and Joshua Greene. His direct and indirect influence is evident in the work of many prominent philosophers of the current generation.

Philosopher Benj Hellie has conducted a quantitative analysis of Lewis's work to study his rate of philosophical progress. According to Hellie, Lewis's most significant breakthroughs came at the midpoint of his career, after transitioning from framing a descriptive science of mind and meaning to focusing on metaphysics. Hellie argues that philosophers can learn much from Lewis's right and wrong steps to maximize philosophical breakthroughs.

=== Australia ===
Lewis frequented Australia throughout his life. Many of his thought experiments draw upon Australia, such as his favourite counterfactual to analyse, 'if kangaroos didn't have tails, they would fall over'. Lewis worked closely with Australian philosophers Alan Hájek, Frank Jackson, and particularly David Armstrong.

== Later life and death ==
Lewis suffered from severe diabetes for much of his life, which eventually grew worse and led to kidney failure. In July 2000, he received a kidney transplant from his wife Stephanie after suffering diabetic kidney failure. Lewis was intending to travel to Colorado on a train from Los Angeles after a flight from Australia when Alan Hájek took him to the hospital. The transplant allowed him to work and travel for another year, before he died suddenly and unexpectedly from further complications of his diabetes, on October 14, 2001.

Since his death a number of posthumous papers have been published, on topics ranging from truth and causation to philosophy of physics. Lewisian Themes, a collection of papers on his philosophy, was published in 2004. A two-volume collection of his correspondence, Philosophical Letters of David K. Lewis, was published in 2020. A 2017 poll of philosophers by Brian Leiter named Lewis the third most important Anglophone philosopher active between 1945 and 2000, behind W. V. O. Quine and Saul Kripke.

== Works ==
=== Books ===
- Convention: A Philosophical Study, Harvard University Press 1969.
- Counterfactuals, Harvard University Press 1973; revised printing Blackwell 1986.
- On the Plurality of Worlds, Blackwell 1986.
- Parts of Classes, Blackwell 1991.

Lewis published five volumes containing 99 papers—almost all the papers he published in his lifetime. They discuss his counterfactual theory of causation, the concept of conversational scoreboard, a contextualist analysis of knowledge, and a dispositional value theory, among many other topics.

- Philosophical Papers, Vol. I (1983) includes his early work on counterpart theory and the philosophy of language and of mind.
- Philosophical Papers, Vol. II (1986) includes his work on counterfactuals, causation, and decision theory, where he promotes his principal principle about rational belief. Its preface discusses Humean supervenience, the name Lewis gave to his overarching philosophical project.
- Papers in Philosophical Logic (1998).
- Papers in Metaphysics and Epistemology (1999) contains "Elusive Knowledge" and "Naming the Colours", honored by being reprinted in the Philosopher's Annual for the year they were first published.
- Papers in Ethics and Social Philosophy (2000).

Lewis's monograph Parts of Classes (1991), on the foundations of mathematics, sketched a reduction of set theory and Peano arithmetic to mereology and plural quantification. Very soon after its publication, Lewis became dissatisfied with some aspects of its argument; it is currently out of print (his paper "Mathematics is Megethology", in Papers in Philosophical Logic, is partly a summary and partly a revision of Parts of Classes).

Nachlass

- Philosophical Letters of David K. Lewis: Volume 1: Causation, Modality, Ontology. Edited by Helen Beebee and A.R.J. Fisher. Oxford University Press. 2020-10-29. ISBN 978-0-19-259760-1.
- Philosophical Letters of David K. Lewis: Volume 2: Mind, Language, Epistemology. Edited by Helen Beebee and A.R.J. Fisher. Oxford University Press. 2020-10-29. ISBN 978-0-19-259787-8.
- Janssen-Lauret, Frederique; MacBride, Fraser, eds. (2023-09-28). Philosophical Manuscripts. Oxford: Oxford University Press. doi:10.1093/oso/9780192847393.001.0001. ISBN 978-0-19-284739-3.

=== Selected papers ===
- "Counterpart Theory and Quantified Modal Logic", Journal of Philosophy 65 (1968): pp. 113–126.
- "General semantics", Synthese, 22(1) (1970): pp. 18–67.
- "Causation", Journal of Philosophy 70 (1973): pp. 556–67. Reprinted with postscripts in Philosophical Papers: Volume II (1986).
- "Semantic Analyses for Dyadic Deontic Logic" in Logical Theory and Semantic Analysis: Essays Dedicated to Stig Kanger on His Fiftieth Birthday, Reidel 1974.
- "The Paradoxes of Time Travel", American Philosophical Quarterly, April (1976): pp. 145–152.
- "Truth in Fiction", American Philosophical Quarterly 15 (1978): pp. 37–46.
- "How to Define Theoretical Terms", Journal of Philosophy 67 (1979): pp. 427–46.
- "Scorekeeping in a Language Game", Journal of Philosophical Logic 8 (1979): pp. 339–59.
- "Mad Pain and Martian Pain", Readings in the Philosophy of Psychology Vol. I. N. Block, ed. Harvard University Press (1980): pp. 216–222.
- "A Subjectivist's Guide to Objective Chance", in R. Jeffrey, ed., Studies in Inductive Logic and Probability: Volume II. Reprinted with postscripts in Philosophical Papers: Volume II (1986).
- "Are We Free to Break the Laws?" Theoria 47 (1981): pp. 113–21.
- "New Work for a Theory of Universals", Australasian Journal of Philosophy 61 (1983): pp. 343–77.
- "What Experience Teaches", in Mind and Cognition by William G. Lycan, (1990 Ed.) pp. 499–519. Article omitted from subsequent editions.
- "Elusive Knowledge", Australasian Journal of Philosophy, 74/4 (1996): pp. 549–567.

== See also ==
- American philosophy
- Bayesian epistemology
- Canberra Plan
- Causal model
- Extended modal realism
- Formal semantics (natural language)
- Humeanism § Causality and necessity
