= Amie Thomasson =

American philosopher (born 1968)

- Born: Amie Lynn Thomasson; July 4, 1968 (age 57)
- Spouse: Peter Lewis

Education
- Education: Brasenose College, Oxford; Duke University (BA); University of California, Irvine (MA, PhD)

Philosophical work
- Era: Contemporary philosophy
- Region: Western philosophy
- School: Analytic
- Institutions: Dartmouth College
- Main interests: Metaphysics, philosophy of mind, phenomenology, philosophy of art, social ontology
- Notable ideas: Easy ontology

Amie Lynn Thomasson (born July 4, 1968) is an American philosopher, currently Professor of Philosophy at Dartmouth College. Thomasson specializes in metaphysics, philosophy of mind, phenomenology and the philosophy of art. She is the author of Fiction and Metaphysics (1999), Ordinary Objects (2007), Ontology Made Easy (2015), and Norms and Necessity (2020).

== Biography ==
Thomasson was a visiting student at Brasenose College, Oxford (1987–1988) before obtaining her BA from Duke University in 1989, her MA in philosophy from the University of California, Irvine (UCI) in 1992 and her PhD in 1995, also from UCI. While at UCI, she studied primarily under David Woodruff Smith. She then worked as a teaching assistant at UCI (1992–1995), a visiting instructor at the University of Salzburg, Austria (1993), assistant professor of philosophy at Texas Tech University (1995–2000), and research assistant professor at the University of Hong Kong (1998–2000). In 2000, she joined the University of Miami as an assistant, then associate and ultimately, full professor. She joined the faculty at Dartmouth College in July 2017.

== Selected works ==
- Fiction and Metaphysics, Cambridge University Press, 1999.
- with David W. Smith (eds.), Phenomenology and Philosophy of Mind, Oxford University Press, 2005.
- Ordinary Objects, Oxford University Press, 2007.
- Ontology Made Easy, Oxford University Press, 2015.
- Norms and Necessity, Oxford University Press, 2020.
- Rethinking Metaphysics, Oxford University Press, 2025.
